= List of county roads in Will County, Illinois =

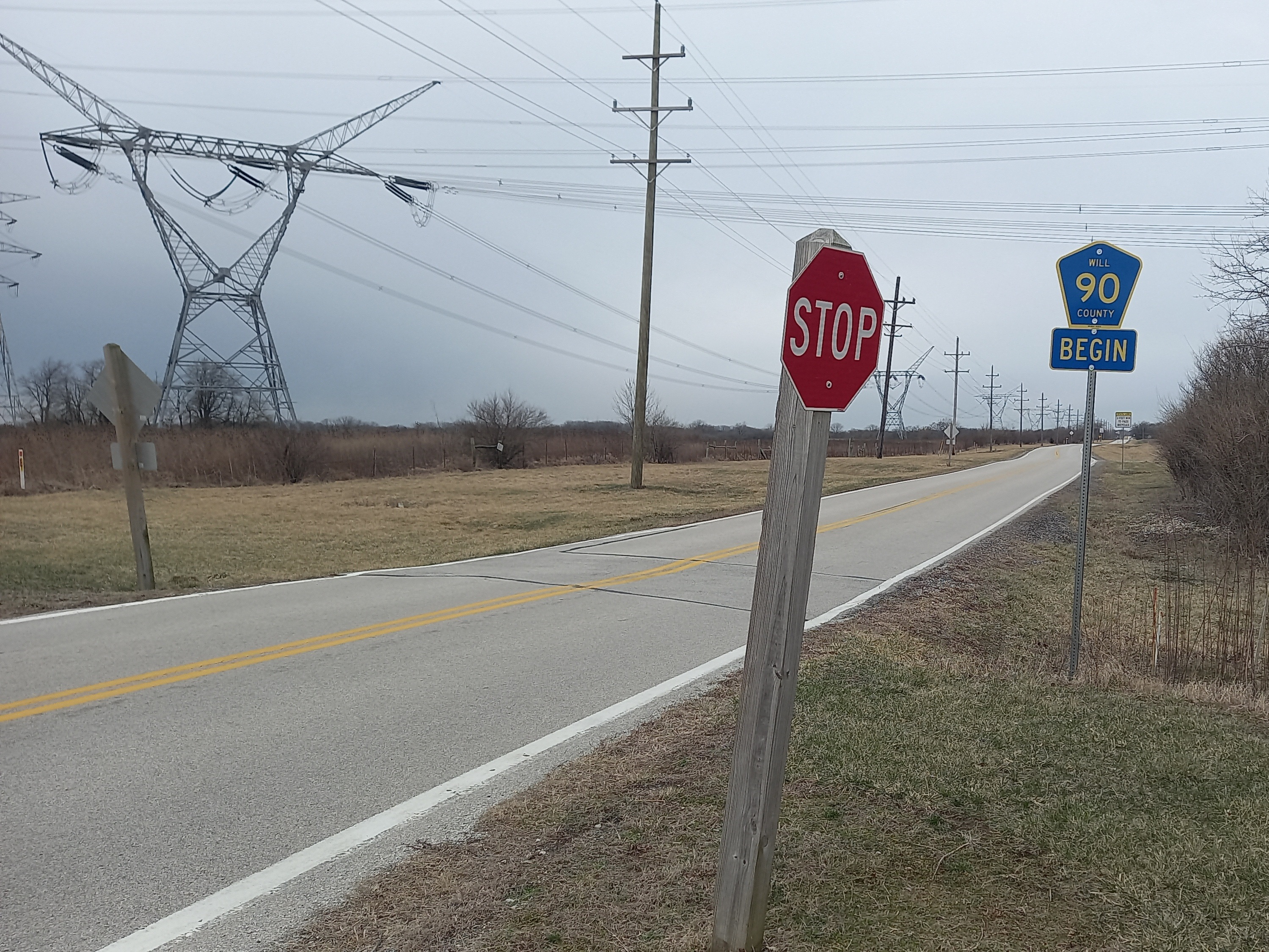
County Road 90 beginning at the Wauponsee Glacial Trail

Will County Highway 36 shield mounted on mast pole

The Will County Highway System is a network of arterial county highways in Will County, Illinois, United States, maintained by the Will County Division of Transportation (WCDOT). The system comprises approximately 55 county roads, covering a total of 620 miles of roadway.

== Signage ==
Will County road signs are marked with the standard M1-6 blue pentagon-shaped highway marker on the base of traffic signals at intersections with other county highways. Additionally, they may be attached to a separate pole at the terminus.

County roads are not marked on any freeway or tollway exits or signed with separate reassurance markers. In addition, although concurrencies of county highways exist in the county, they too are not explicitly signed as such.

Furthermore, cardinal directions such as north, south, east, and west are not signed by WCDOT, with only the county road shield being displayed. The termini of some county roads are signed by "END" and "BEGIN" plaques below the county shield like illustrated in the accompanying image of County Road 90.

== Route list ==
Number	Length (mi)	Length (km)	Southern or western terminus	Northern or eastern terminus	Local names	Formed	Removed	Notes
CR 1	3.664	5.897	US 6 near Homer Glen	East Will-Cook county line in Homer Glen	Parker Road, Hadley Road	—	—	
CR 4	3.204	5.156	US 52 (Joliet Road) near Manhattan	US 52 (Cedar Road) near Manhattan	Wilton Road	—	—	Southern segment
CR 4	6.825	10.984	US 52 (Cedar Road) in Manhattan	CR 74 (Laraway Road) in New Lenox	South Cedar Road	—	—	Northern segment
CR 5	0.994	1.600	Essington Road in Joliet	US 30 (Plainfield Road) in Crest Hill	Caton Farm Road	—	—	
CR 6	5.395	8.682	CR 19 (Center Road) in Frankfort	IL 50 (Governors Highway) in Monee	Manhattan-Monee Road	—	—	
CR 7	3.041	4.894	Wesley-Florence Township Line near Wilmington	South Arsenal Road, Quigley Road near Wilmington	Old Chicago Road	—	—	
CR 8	4.184	6.733	IL 102 near Wilmington	East Kankakee-Will county line near Manteno	Manteno Road	—	—	
CR 10	8.532	13.731	South Kankakee-Will county line near Peotone	Court Street, Crete-Monee Road in Monee	Will Center Road	—	—	
CR 14	5.232	8.420	127th Street in Plainfield	87th Street in Naperville	Plainfield-Naperville Road	—	—	Plainfield-Naperville Road continues north as DuPage CR 1
CR 16	3.004	4.834	IL 7 (159th Street) in Homer Glen	North Will-Cook county line in Lemont	Bell Road	—	—	Bell Road continues north as Cook CR W18
CR 17	7.965	12.818	Elwood International Port Road in Elwood	US 52 in Manhattan	Arsenal Road, Manhattan Road	—	—	
CR 19	10.109	16.269	CR 25 (Wilmington Road) near Peotone	Steger Road in Frankfort	Center Road	—	—	
CR 20	5.467	8.798	US 45/US 52 near Peotone	West Street	Joliet Road (Peotone)	—	—	
CR 21	4.365	7.025	IL 59 (Neltnor Boulevard) in West Chicago	Main Street – Glen Ellyn in Glen Ellyn	Crete-Monee Road	—	—	
CR 23	6.833	10.997	IL 50 (Governors Highway) in Monee	IL 1/IL 394 (Dixie Highway) in Crete	Pauling Road, Goodenow Road	—	—	Southern terminus of IL 394
CR 24	13.461	21.663	IL 50 (Harlem Avenue) in Peotone	Illinois-Indiana state line	Peotone-Beecher Road, Indiana Avenue	—	—	
CR 25	18.079	29.095	IL 53 in Wilmington	CR 70 (Drecksler Road) in Peotone	Wilmington-Peotone Road	—	—	Longest county highway in Will County
CR 28	4.012	6.457	South Will-Kankakee county line near Essex	IL 113 near Braidwood	Essex Road	—	—	Essex Road continues south as Kankakee CR 41
CR 29	1.606	2.585	IL 129 (Washington Street) near Wilmington	IL 53 (Baltimore Street) in Wilmington	Strip Mine Road	—	—	
CR 35	2.300	3.701	New Avenue in Romeoville	Archer Avenue in Lemont	135th Street - Romeo Road	—	—	
CR 36	5.854	9.421	US 30 (Joliet Road) in Plainfield	IL 7/IL 53 in Lockport	Renwick Road	—	—	
CR 37	5.694	9.164	US 30 (Joliet Road) in Plainfield	IL 7/IL 53 in Lockport	143rd Street	—	—	
CR 43	2.102	3.383	CR 25 (Wilmington Road) near Manhattan	US 52 (Cedar Road) near Manhattan	South Cedar Road	—	—	
CR 49	7.865	12.657	CR 53 (Western Avenue) in University Park	Illinois-Indiana state line near Crete	Exchange Street	—	—	
CR 51	2.966	4.773	IL 53 (Chicago Street) in Joliet	CR 55 (Cherry Hill Road) in Joliet	Mills Road	—	—	
CR 53	3.460	5.568	CR 21 (Crete-Monee Road) in University Park	North Will-Cook county line in Park Forest	Western Avenue	—	—	
CR 55	1.704	2.742	CR 51 (Mills Road) in Joliet	US 30 (Cass Street) in Joliet	Cherry Hill Road	—	—	
CR 58	5.854	9.421	CR 10 (Will Center Road) in Plainfield	IL 7/IL 53 in Lockport	County Line Road	—	—	
CR 63	1.544	2.485	US 30 (Lincoln Highway) in New Lenox	CR 64 (Francis Road) in Mokena	Schoolhouse Road	—	—	
CR 64	6.127	9.860	CR 52 (Gougar Road) in Joliet	Front Street in Mokena	Francis Road	—	—	
CR 66	1.972	3.174	Illinois Route 59 in Naperville	CR 14 (Plainfield-Naperville Road) in Bolingbrook	111th Street, Hassert Boulevard	—	—	
CR 74	12.382	19.927	US 52 in Joliet	East Will-Cook county line in Frankfort	Laraway Road	—	—	
CR 77	1.320	2.124	US 6 in Channahon	I-55 in Channahon	West Bluff Road	—	—	
CR 79	2.024	3.257	South Kankakee-Will county line	CR 25 (Wilmington Road) near Manhattan	Tully Road	—	—	Tully Road continues south as Kankakee CR 7
CR 80	1.742	2.803	West Grundy-Will county line	BNSF Railroad in Wilmington	Lorenzo Road	—	—	
CR 83	1.001	1.611	CR 84 (191st Street) in Tinley Park	183rd Street in Tinley Park	80th Avenue	—	—	
CR 84	3.008	4.841	US 45 (LaGrange Road) in Mokena	IL 43 (Harlem Avenue) in Tinley Park	191st Street	—	—	
CR 86	0.476	0.766	US 52 (Manhattan Road) in Joliet	CR 74 (Laraway Road) in Joliet	Cherry Hill Road	—	—	Shortest county highway in Will County
CR 88	9.384	15.102	US 30 (Plainfield Road) in Crest Hill	Lily Cache Lane in Bolingbrook	Weber Road	—	—	
CR 89	1.205	1.939	CR 14 (Plainfield-Naperville Road) in Naperville	DuPage River Bridge in Bolingbrook	95th Street	2017	current	
CR 90	5.880	9.463	IL 53 in Elwood	Wauponsee Glacial Trail near Manhattan	Hoff Road	—	—	
