= U.S. Route 52 in Illinois =

US Highway section within the state of Illinois

U.S. Route 52
- US 52 highlighted in red

Route information
- Maintained by IDOT
- Length: 215.78 mi (347.26 km)

Major junctions
- West end: US 52 / Iowa 64 at Savanna
- US 30 near Amboy; US 34 in Mendota; I-39 / US 51 in Troy Grove; I-55 in Shorewood; US 6 / IL 53 in Joliet; I-80 in Joliet; US 45 near Andres; US 45 / IL 49 near L'Erable; IL 1 near Martinton; US 24 in Sheldon
- East end: US 24 / US 52 east of Sheldon

Location
- Country: United States
- State: Illinois
- Counties: Carroll, Ogle, Lee, LaSalle, Kendall, Will, Kankakee, Iroquois

Highway system
- United States Numbered Highway System; List; Special; Divided; Illinois State Highway System; Interstate; US; State; Tollways; Scenic
← US 51	→ IL 53
← IL 26	IL 27	→ IL 28
← IL 43	IL 44	→ US 45
← IL 68	IL 69	→ I-70

U.S. Route 52 (US 52) in the state of Illinois is a surface road that traverses the north central and eastern portions of the state. It runs from the Dale Gardner Veterans Memorial Bridge over the Mississippi River between Sabula, Iowa, and Savanna with Illinois Route 64 (IL 64) southeast to the Indiana state line near Sheldon with US 24. This is a distance of 215.78 miles (347.26 km).

== Route description ==
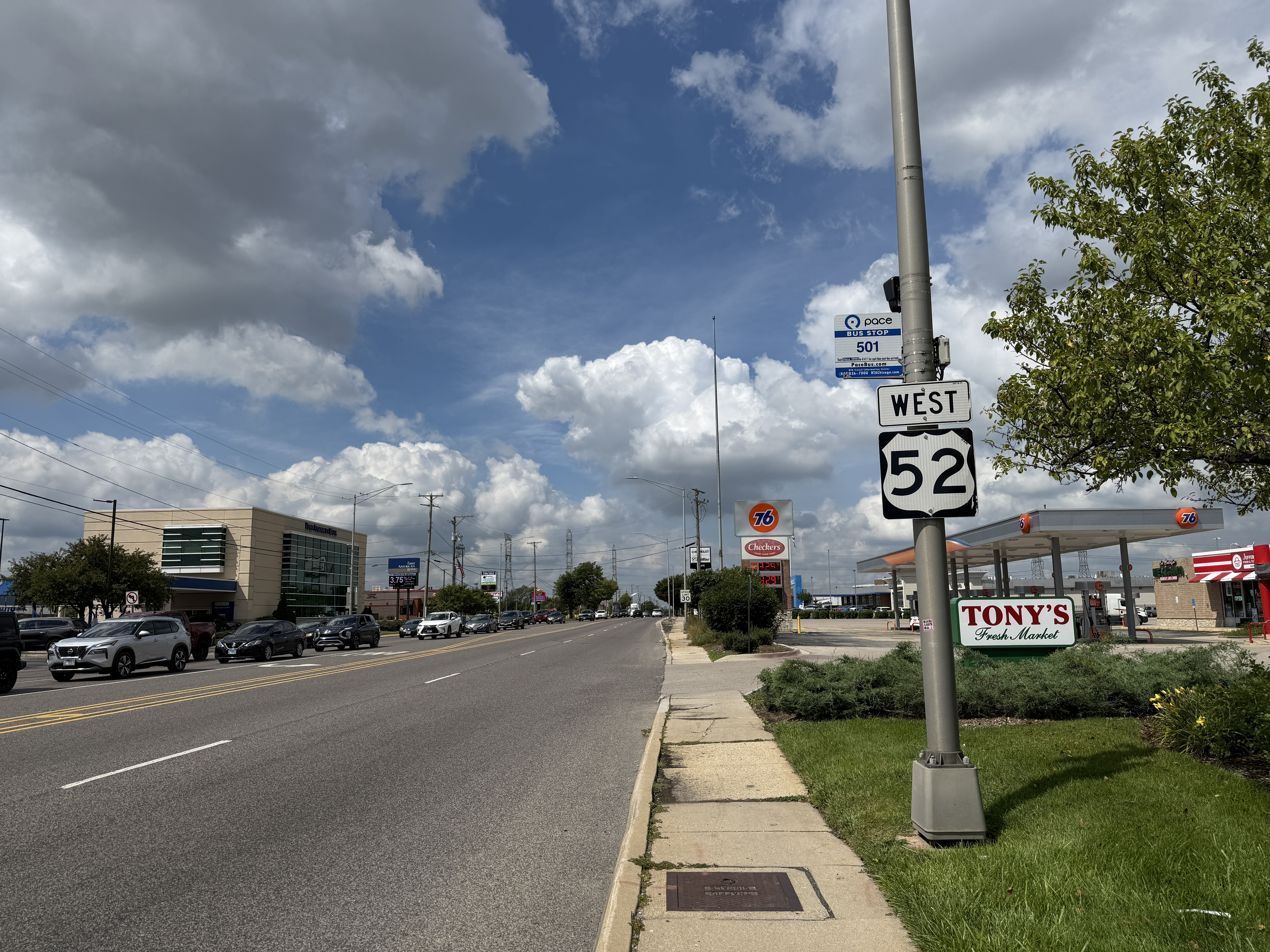
US 52 westbound past IL 7 in Joliet

US 52 travels southeast from the Dale Gardner Veterans Memorial Bridge at the terminus of Iowa Highway 64 (Iowa 64) and IL 64 in Savanna, going through the cities of Dixon, Amboy and Mendota.

US 52 then turns due south and then east, crossing Interstate 39 (I-39) and US 51 near Troy Grove. It continues east, traveling through Shorewood and then through the southern portion of Joliet, where it is a major thoroughfare in the city of Joliet (Jefferson Street), avoiding the city of Chicago proper. It joins with US 45 through Kankakee, and then travels concurrently with US 24, east of Watseka to the Indiana state line.

== History ==
In 1935, US 52 was extended northwest from Fowler, Indiana to an international border crossing at Portal, North Dakota. Subsequently in Illinois, the entirety of Illinois Route 27, which ran between Savanna and Polo, was replaced by US 52. Portions of the following routes were also replaced:

- Illinois Route 2 between Dixon and Mendota
- Illinois Route 69 (IL 69) between Troy Grove and Lisbon
- Illinois Routes 113 and 113S between Coal City and Kankakee
- Illinois Route 49 between Kankakee and L'Erable
- Illinois Route 116 between L'Erable and Sheldon.

In 1940, US 52 was rerouted to directly serve Joliet, having previously bypassed the city via the aforementioned routes, routing through what was then called Barr Highway. Subsequently, the rest of IL 69 and the entirety of Illinois Route 44 were decommissioned.

== Major intersections ==
County	Location	mi	km	Destinations	Notes
Mississippi River		0.00	0.00	US 52 north / Iowa 64 west – Sabula	Continuation into Iowa
Mississippi River		0.00	0.00	Dale Gardner Veterans Memorial Bridge	
Carroll	Savanna	0.13	0.21	IL 84 north / Great River Road (National Route) north (Main Street) – Galena	Western ends of IL 84 and Great River Road overlaps
Carroll	Savanna	2.19	3.52	IL 84 south / Great River Road (National Route) south (Viaduct Road) – East Moline	Eastern ends of IL 84 and Great River Road overlaps
Carroll	Mount Carroll	11.09	17.85	IL 78 (Clay Street) to IL 40 – Morrison	
Carroll	Lanark	18.69	30.08	IL 73 north (Broad Street) – Pearl City, Lena	
Carroll	Rock Creek–Lima Township	28.62	46.06	IL 64 east – Dixon	Eastern end of IL 64 overlap
Ogle	Buffalo Township	35.0	56.3	IL 26 north – Forreston	Western end of IL 26 overlap
Lee	Dixon	49.3	79.3	IL 2 south (Everett Street) / Lincoln Highway – Sterling	Western end of IL 2 overlap
Lee	Dixon	49.8	80.1	IL 2 north (2nd Street) – Rockford	Eastern end of IL 2 overlap
Lee	Dixon	50.1	80.6	IL 26 south (Galena Avenue) to I-88 Toll / IL 110 (CKC) – Princeton, Ronald Reagan Boyhood Home	Eastern end of IL 26 overlap
Lee	Dixon	50.5	81.3	IL 38 east (Franklin Grove Road) / Lincoln Highway – Rochelle	
Lee	Franklin Grove–Amboy township line	60.1	96.7	US 30 to I-39 – Rock Falls, Aurora	
LaSalle	Mendota	78.0	125.5	IL 251 north (East 2nd Road, 13th Avenue) – Rochelle	Northern end of IL 251 overlap
LaSalle	Mendota	79.0	127.1	US 34 (Washington Street) – La Moille, Earlville	
LaSalle	Troy Grove Township	84.4	135.8	IL 251 south (East 2nd Road) – Peru	Southern end of IL 251 overlap
LaSalle	Troy Grove–Ophir township line	88.5	142.4	I-39 / US 51 – LaSalle–Peru, Rockford	Exit 66 on I-39
LaSalle	Freedom Township	99.4	160.0	IL 23 south (E. 17th Road) – Ottawa	Western end of IL 23 overlap
LaSalle	Freedom–Serena township line	101.6	163.5	IL 23 north (E. 18th Road) – DeKalb	Eastern end of IL 23 overlap
LaSalle	Mission Township	110.3	177.5	IL 71	
Kendall	Lisbon Township	122.2	196.7	IL 47 – Morris, Yorkville	
Will	Shorewood	134.7	216.8	IL 59 / Historic US 66 (Will Rogers Highway)	Alternate route of Historic US 66
Will	Shorewood	135.2	217.6	I-55 – Chicago, Bloomington–Normal	Exit 253 on I-55
Will	Joliet	138.5	222.9	IL 7 (Larkin Avenue)	
Will	Joliet	140.7	226.4	US 6 west (Railroad Street)	Western end of US 6 overlap
Will	Joliet	141.2	227.2	US 6 east / IL 53 north / Historic US 66	Eastern end of US 6 overlap; northern end of IL 53 overlap
Will	Joliet	141.6	227.9	I-80 – Gary, Moline–Rock Island	Exit 132 on I-80
Will	Joliet	142.0	228.5	IL 53 south / Historic US 66 – Wilmington	Southern end of IL 53 overlap
Will	Peotone Township	159.4	256.5	US 45 north – Frankfort	Northern end of US 45 overlap
Kankakee	Bourbonnais	173.1	278.6	IL 102 west (Main Street NW) – Wilmington	
Kankakee	Kankakee	175.5	282.4	IL 17 west (Court Street) – Dwight	Western end of IL 17 overlap
Kankakee	Kankakee	175.9	283.1	IL 17 east (Court Street)	Eastern end of IL 17 overlap
Kankakee	Kankakee	176.5	284.0	IL 115 south (McCullin Drive)	
Kankakee	Kankakee	177.2	285.2	IL 50 north (Schuyler Avenue)	
Kankakee	Kankakee	179.1	288.2	I-57 – Chicago, Champaign	Exit 308 on I-57
Iroquois	Ashkum Township	192.2	309.3	US 45 south / IL 49 south – Ashkum, Crescent City	Southern end of US 45 overlap
Iroquois	Martinton Township	199.3	320.7	IL 1 – Martinton, Watseka	
Iroquois	Sheldon	213.8	344.1	US 24 west – Watseka	Western end of US 24 overlap
Iroquois	Sheldon Township	215.78	347.26	US 24 east / US 52 east – Kentland	Continuation into Indiana
1.000 mi = 1.609 km; 1.000 km = 0.621 mi: Concurrency terminus

U.S. Route 52
Previous state: Iowa	Illinois	Next state: Indiana
