= Hamel, Illinois =

- Village
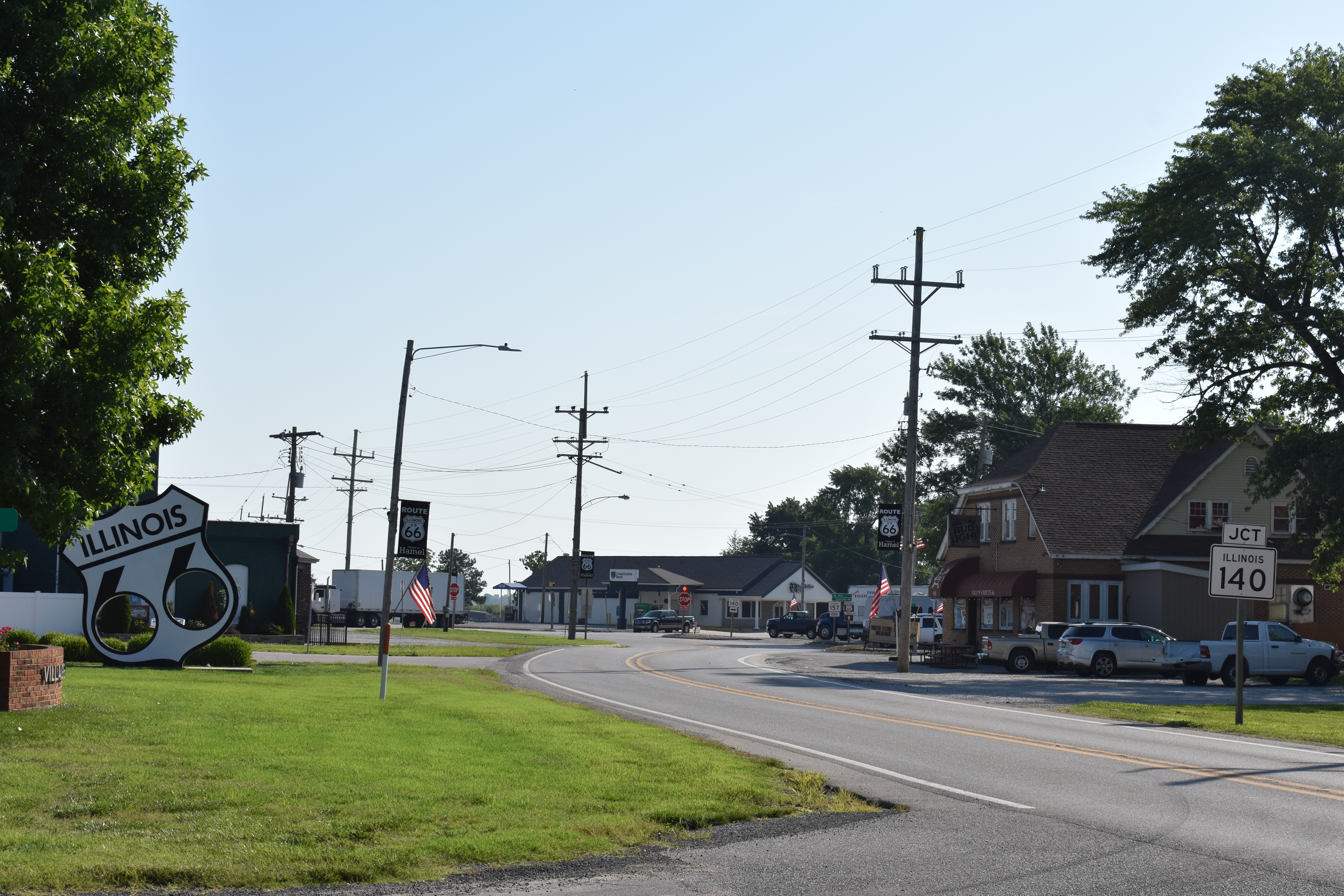
- Hamel in July 2026

- Location in Madison County, Illinois
- Coordinates: 38°53′22″N 89°50′33″W
- Country: United States
- State: Illinois
- County: Madison
- Township: Hamel
- Founded: 1818
- Incorporated: February 24, 1955

Government
  - Village President: Justin Gerstner

Area
  - Total: 1.20 sq mi (3.10 km^{2})
  - Land: 1.19 sq mi (3.08 km^{2})
  - Water: 0.0077 sq mi (0.02 km^{2})
- Elevation: 548 ft (167 m)

Population (2020)
  - Total: 929
  - Density: 780.9/sq mi (301.49/km^{2})
- Time zone: UTC-6 (CST)
  - Summer (DST): UTC-5 (CDT)
- ZIP code: 62046
- Area code: 618
- FIPS code: 17-32408
- GNIS feature ID: 2398229
- Website: www.villageofhamel.com

Hamel is a village in Madison County, Illinois, United States. The population was 929 at the 2020 census, up from 816 in 2010. It is a part of the Illinois Metro East portion of the Greater St. Louis metropolitan area. The village is located along Interstate 55 (I-55), and Illinois Routes 140 and 157.

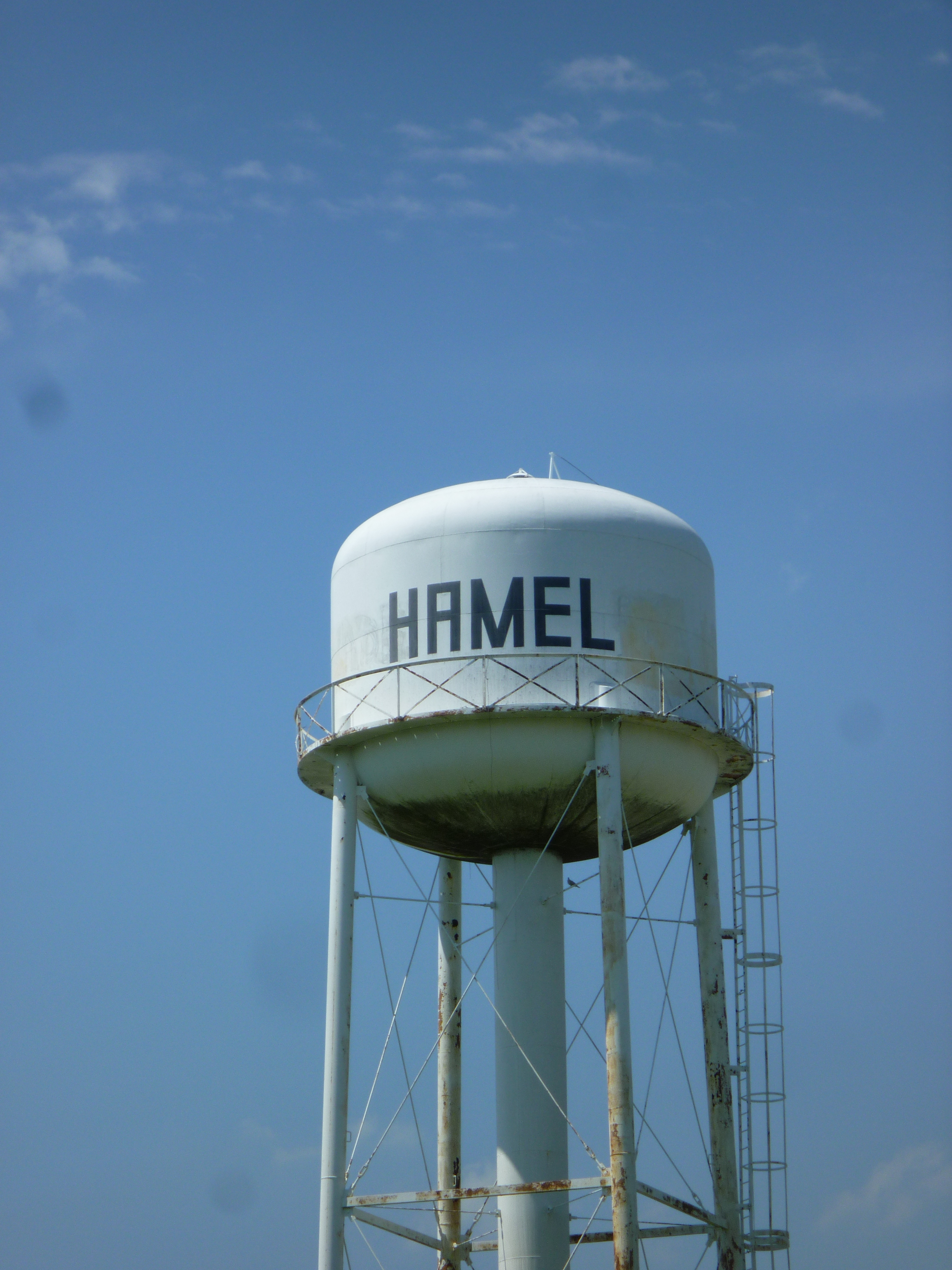
Hamel Water Tower

== History ==
Hamel was founded in 1818 and developed as a farming community at a rural crossroads; it was named for A. J. "Jack" Hamel, a local farmer. German immigrants settled the area in the 1830s and established St. Paul Lutheran Church, which built its first church by 1861. Hamel was incorporated as a village on February 24, 1955.

U.S. Route 66 ran through Hamel from 1926 until 1965. The village retains landmarks from that era, including the blue neon cross at St. Paul Lutheran Church, placed in memory of a local son killed in World War II, and a 1930s roadhouse on the old highway now known as Weezy's Route 66.

== Geography ==
Hamel is located in northeastern Madison County. I-55 passes through the east side of the village, leading southwest 30 miles (48 km) to St. Louis and north 65 miles (105 km) to Springfield, the Illinois capital. Illinois Route 140 (IL 140) passes through the center of Hamel as State Street, leading east 23 miles (37 km) to Greenville and west 19 miles (31 km) to Alton.

According to the U.S. Census Bureau, Hamel has a total area of 1.20 square miles (3.11 km^{2}), of which 0.01 square miles (0.03 km^{2}), or 0.75%, are water. Hamel is drained to the south by tributaries of Silver Creek, a south-flowing tributary of the Kaskaskia River.

== Demographics ==
Historical population
Census	Pop.	Note	%±
1960	362		—
1970	454		25.4%
1980	537		18.3%
1990	530		−1.3%
2000	570		7.5%
2010	816		43.2%
2020	929		13.8%
U.S. Decennial Census

As of the census of 2000, there were 570 people, 233 households, and 170 families living in the village. The population density was 491.3 inhabitants per square mile (189.7/km^{2}). There were 242 housing units at an average density of 208.6 per square mile (80.5/km^{2}). The racial makeup of the village was 98.25% White, 0.35% from other races, and 1.40% from two or more races. Hispanic or Latino of any race were 0.53% of the population.

There were 233 households, out of which 31.3% had children under the age of 18 living with them, 63.5% were married couples living together, 8.2% had a female householder with no husband present, and 27.0% were non-families. 24.5% of all households were made up of individuals, and 10.7% had someone living alone who was 65 years of age or older. The average household size was 2.45 and the average family size was 2.92.

In the village, the population was spread out, with 24.2% under the age of 18, 6.1% from 18 to 24, 31.8% from 25 to 44, 21.6% from 45 to 64, and 16.3% who were 65 years of age or older. The median age was 37 years. For every 100 females, there were 91.9 males. For every 100 females age 18 and over, there were 85.4 males.

The median income for a household in the village was $45,750, and the median income for a family was $55,694. Males had a median income of $41,023 versus $24,028 for females. The per capita income for the village was $19,062. About 4.0% of families and 3.6% of the population were below the poverty line, including 3.2% of those under age 18 and 5.5% of those age 65 or over.

== Education ==
The community lies within the Edwardsville Community Unit School District 7.

== See also ==
- List of municipalities in Illinois
