= Richland School District 88A =

School district in Illinois, United States

Address
- 1919 Caton Farm Road Crest Hill, Illinois, 60403; United States

District information
- Type: Public
- Grades: PreK–8
- NCES District ID: 1733450

Students and staff
- Students: 821

Other information
- Website: www.d88a.org

Richland School District 88A is an elementary and middle school district Crest Hill, Illinois, a suburb of Chicago.

Richland Elementary School has grades K-4. Richland Junior High School serves grades 5–8. High school students matriculate to Lockport Township High School or Joliet Catholic Academy.

== Student body ==
As of 2015 the school has 966 students: 36.9% of them are white, 31.7% are Hispanic, 5.4% are Asian, .3% are Pacific Islander, and 11.8% are of two or more races.

== History ==
The original building was built in 1957 and is now where the 5th grade, Spanish classes, and superintendent office is. In 1968, two additional hallways were added which now serve the Lockport Area Special Education Cooperative (LASEC), 6th grade, a gym and main office. In 2002, another hallway was added which serves 7th and 8th graders. This addition made the school a square shape with a playground in the middle. At the start of the 2007-2008 school year, an additional two-story building was opened to serve the elementary grades (Pre-K through 4th grade) due to overcrowding. This addition also included a shared area that consisted of a new choir/music room, teachers lounge, library and cafeteria that connected it to the older building, now the junior high (grades 5-8) with both buildings still sharing the gymnasium.
