= 1883 Diamond Mine Disaster =

Coal mine disaster in Illinois, US

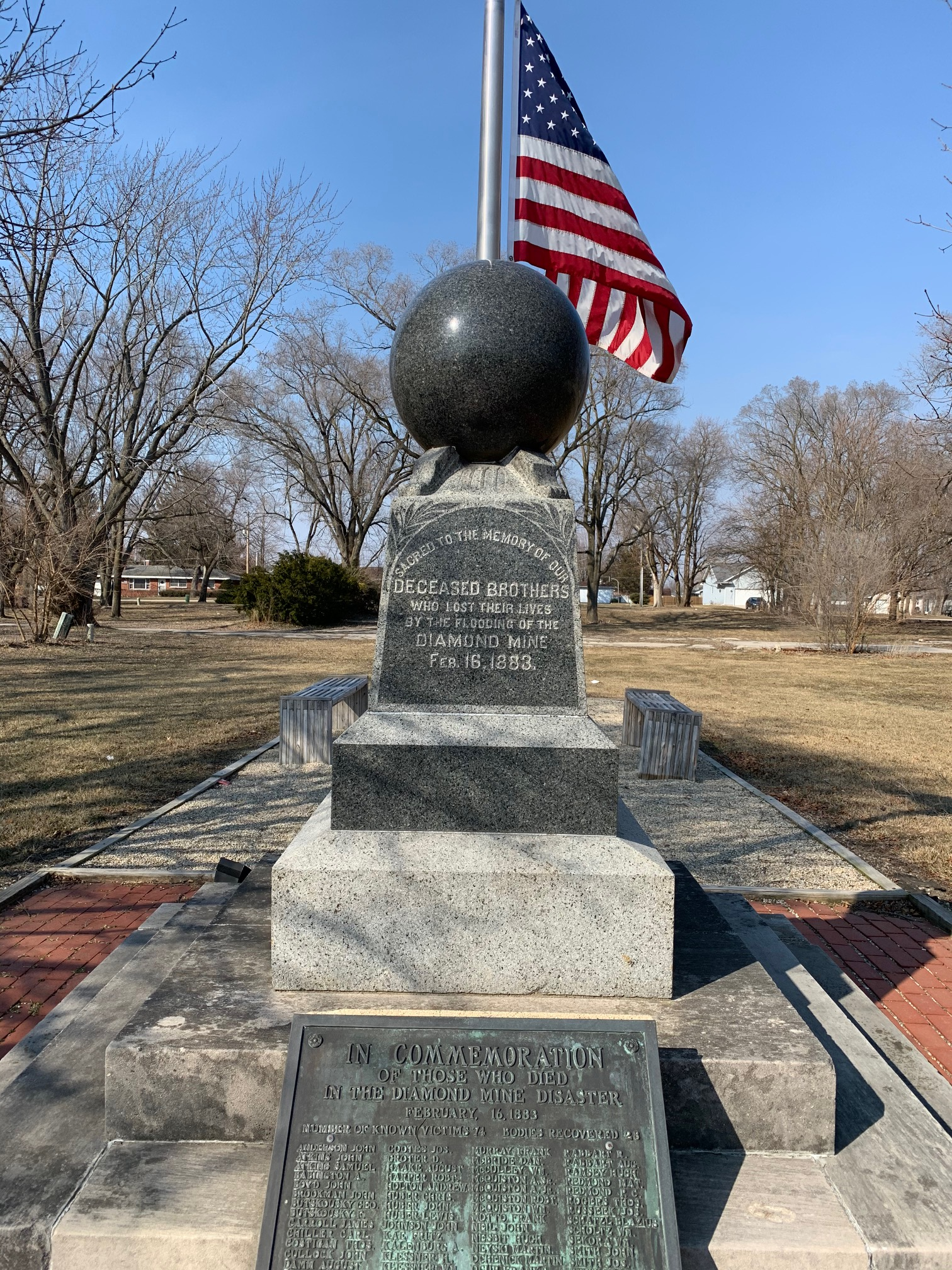
Diamond Mine Disaster Memorial, Diamond, Illinois

On February 16, 1883, the Diamond No. 2 Coal Mine, near Braidwood, Illinois, flooded with snow melt and rain water. Seventy-four men and boys were trapped in the mine and perished. The 1883 Diamond Mine Disaster was one of the worst mining disasters in Illinois history.

== Background ==
The Diamond No. 2 Mine was located in the Wilmington Coal Field near the border between Will and Grundy counties, Illinois, and was operated by the Wilmington Coal Mining & Manufacturing Company. The mine had been in operation since at least July 1881. The mine had 3 shafts, the main shaft, an air shaft near the collapsed part of the mine and an air/escape shaft, just west of the main shaft.

It is estimated that between 200 and 400 men and boys were regularly employed in the mines. The miners lived in Braidwood, Diamond, Illinois, and other nearby communities in Grundy and Will counties in Illinois.

== Disaster ==
The weather was unseasonably warm in Grundy and Will counties in early February, 1883. Standing water on the surface of the mines in the area reached a depth of one to three feet due to snow melt and recent heavy rains. The prairie on the surface of the Diamond Mine was quite flat and marshy which made natural drainage in the area of the mine very difficult. On the morning of February 16, 1883, mines adjacent to the Diamond Mine were closed because the danger of surface water seeping into the mine was recognized by the superintendents of those mines. However, the Diamond Mine was open for business. The men descended into the mine for their day's work.

Around midday the "cager" who was at the bottom of the main shaft at the time, noticed an unusual amount of water collecting at the bottom of the main shaft. He went to the surface to check on the condition of the pumps. The pumps were working properly, so he went back to the bottom of the shaft. The water had reached a level of 3 feet and was rising quickly. He sounded an alarm in the mine and he went back to the surface to sound the alarm there.

Within 30 minutes, the mine was completely flooded. Surface water had broken through a narrow spur or gangway which was 12 to 15 feet below the surface of the surrounding prairie. Water poured into the mine and the main shaft was quickly inaccessible to the trapped miners. Since the working face of the mine was in the westernmost part of the works, men had to move east towards the escape shaft and the main shaft in order to exit the mine. The collapsed part of the mine was near the eastern air shaft and water was rushing from the eastern part of the mine directly towards the men as they moved east towards the main shaft and the escape shaft. Most of the miners that escaped exited through the escape shaft. When that shaft also filled with water, escape to the surface was no longer possible. Seventy-four of the estimated 185 miners who went down into the mine that morning perished.

Meanwhile, on the surface, the alarm whistles brought family members and miners from other mines to the area of the Diamond No. 2 mine. The other mines in the area closed and the miners from these nearby mines together with the miners that escaped from the flooded mine sought a way to help those still trapped below. Unfortunately, rescue efforts were quickly deemed to be futile. By that evening, water had filled the mine to within 5 feet of the surface.

== Aftermath ==
Recovery efforts began shortly after the mine flooded. Several large pumps were brought to the site and began pumping water from the mine day and night. Pumping went on continuously for 38 days. Recovery workers entered the mine on March 25, 1883, and the first bodies were brought to the surface the next day. A total of 28 bodies were discovered and brought to the surface where some of the bodies were identified and all were buried. After a few days, recovery efforts were deemed too risky to continue. The pumps were stopped and the remaining victims were never recovered.

The Diamond Mine Disaster attracted nationwide attention. Newspaper articles from many states described the plight of the widows and fatherless children created by the disaster. Donations came in from as far away as New Mexico and New York. The Illinois State General Assembly also set up a $10,000 fund to help the victims.

== Memorial ==
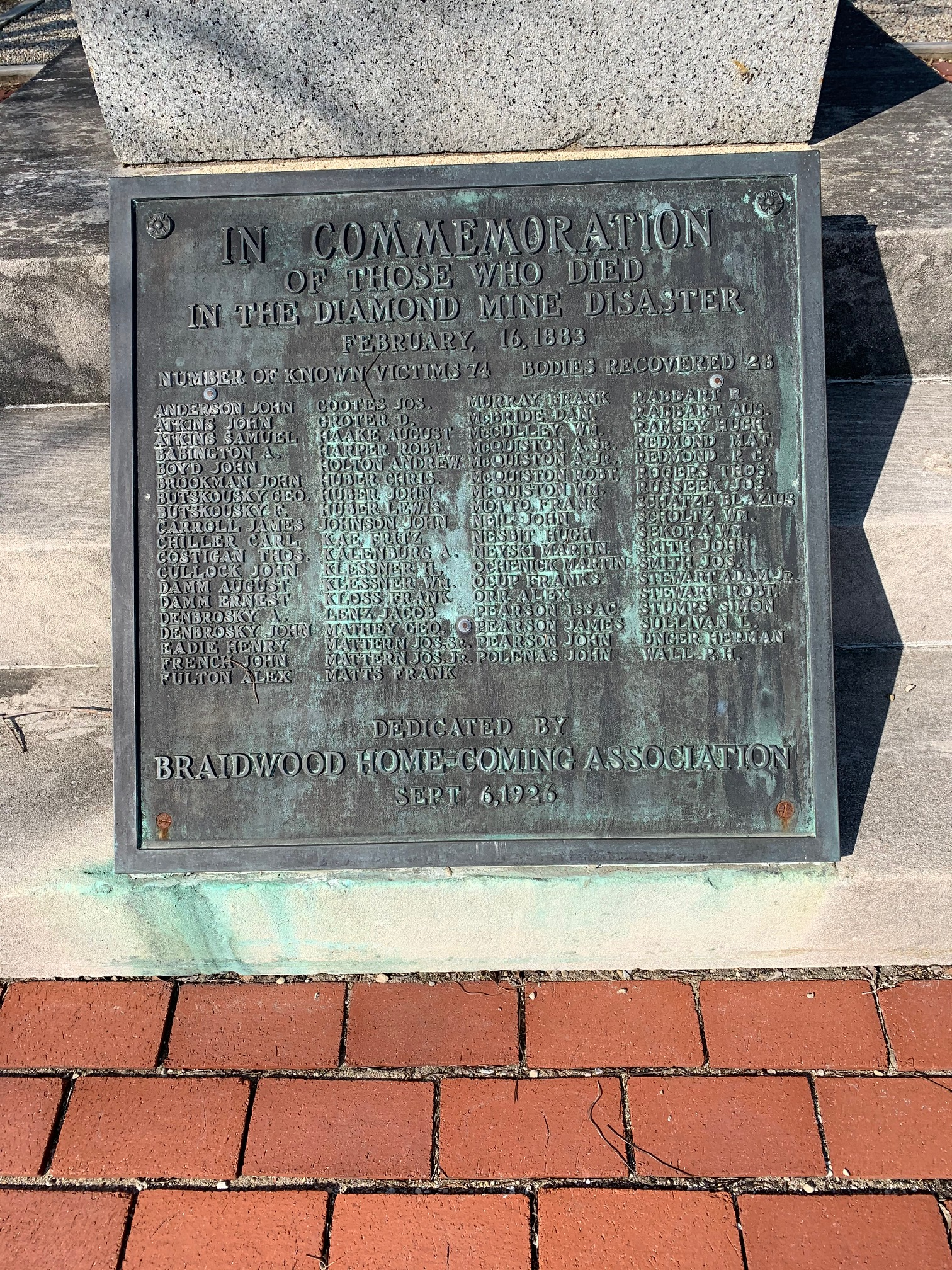
Diamond Mine Disaster Memorial - Victims Plaque

The United Mine Workers of America dedicated a monument to the victims of the Mine Disaster in 1898. The monument is located in the southeast part of the former mine on Illinois Route 113 in Diamond, Illinois just west of Coal City, Illinois. On September 6, 1926, 43 years after the disaster, the Braidwood Homecoming Committee dedicated a plaque with the names of the victims. This plaque is located at the base of the United Mine Workers Memorial.
