= Interstate 55 in Illinois =

Section of Interstate Highway in Illinois, United States

Interstate 55
- I-55 highlighted in red

Route information
- Maintained by IDOT
- Length: 294.38 mi (473.76 km)
- NHS: Entire route

Major junctions
- South end: I-55 / I-64 / US 40 at the Missouri state line in East St. Louis
- I-64 / I-70 / IL 3 in East St. Louis; I-255 in Collinsville; I-70 / I-270 in Troy; I-72 / US 36 in Springfield; I-155 near Lincoln; I-74 / US 51 in Bloomington; I-39 / US 51 in Normal; I-80 in Joliet; I-355 Toll in Bolingbrook; I-294 Toll in Burr Ridge; I-90 / I-94 in Chicago
- North end: US 41 in Chicago

Location
- Country: United States
- State: Illinois
- Counties: St. Clair, Madison, Macoupin, Montgomery, Sangamon, Logan, McLean, Livingston, Grundy, Will, DuPage, Cook

Highway system
- Interstate Highway System; Main; Auxiliary; Suffixed; Business; Future; Illinois State Highway System; Interstate; US; State; Tollways; Scenic
← IL 54	→ IL 55

Interstate 55 (I-55) is a major north–south Interstate Highway in the US state of Illinois that connects St. Louis, Missouri, to the Chicago metropolitan area. It enters the state from Missouri near East St. Louis, Illinois, and runs to U.S. Route 41 (US 41, Lake Shore Drive) near Downtown Chicago, where the highway ends, a distance of 294.38 miles (473.76 km). The road also runs through the Illinois cities of Springfield, Bloomington, and Joliet. The section in Cook County is officially named the Stevenson Expressway for the governor, and in DuPage County it's officially named the Joliet Freeway or the Will Rogers Freeway for the humorist. The section from the south suburbs to the area near Pontiac is officially named the Barack Obama Presidential Expressway after the president, who launched his political career from Illinois.

== Route description ==
I-55 within Illinois carries heavy traffic, with an average of more than 20,000 vehicles per day for most of its length. Significant portions of I-55 contain six lanes (three lanes in each direction) and are heavily used by commuters. I-55 in Illinois begins in East St. Louis on the Poplar Street Bridge over the Mississippi River at the Missouri state line and runs southwest to northeast through the state, ending in Chicago at US 41 (Lake Shore Drive). Along the way, it goes through four metropolitan areas in the state: the Illinois portion of the St. Louis metropolitan area, the Springfield metropolitan area, the Bloomington–Normal metropolitan area, and the Chicago metropolitan area (also known as Chicagoland).

=== East St. Louis to Springfield ===
I-55 enters Illinois on the Poplar Street Bridge from Missouri, running concurrently with I-64 and US 40. The highway meets Illinois Route 3 (IL 3) at a series of complex interchanges. IL 3 joins I-55/I-64/US 40 for approximately two miles (3.2 km). Still in East St. Louis, I-64 and IL 3 leave I-55/US 40, while the current routing of I-70 joins the pair. The three routes continue north-northeast, intersecting the southern terminus of IL 203 near Granite City, IL 111 near Fairmont Park, I-255 and IL 157 in Collinsville, and IL 159 in Maryville.

Approximately two miles (3.2 km) after the IL 159 interchange, US 40 leaves I-55/I-70. After an interchange with IL 162 in Troy, I-70 heads east toward Effingham. At the same interchange, I-270 intersects I-55 and ends. On its way further north, I-55 intersects IL 143 near Edwardsville, IL 140 in Hamel, IL 4 south of Livingston, local roads that connect to Livingston and Staunton, and IL 138 near White City. About eight miles (13 km) further north, I-55 intersects IL 16 at a larger interchange to the west of Litchfield. It then goes another eight miles (13 km) before meeting the eastern terminus of IL 108 to the east of Carlinville. Continuing along, it meets the southern and northern termini of IL 48 and IL 127 west of Raymond, local roads to Farmersville and Divernon, IL 104 near Auburn, and two local roads to Glenarm and Chatham. At the East Lake Drive interchange, I-55 crosses over Lake Springfield into Springfield proper.

=== Springfield to Bloomington ===
I-55 enters Springfield at an interchange with Toronto Road. About two miles (3.2 km) further north, it meets I-72 and US 36 to form a six-mile (9.7 km) concurrency that skirts the southern and eastern edges of the city. At the same interchange, it meets the southern end of I-55 Business (I-55 Bus.). I-55/I-72/US 36 has two interchanges while on the concurrency: Stevenson Drive/East Lake Drive and IL 29. Two miles (3.2 km) north, I-72 and US 36 head east toward Decatur and Champaign. At this interchange, I-55 intersects IL 97, which leads to downtown Springfield. I-55 then crosses the western terminus of IL 54 (old US 54). Five miles (8.0 km) further north, it meets the northern terminus of I-55 Bus., effectively leaving Springfield.

From Springfield to Chicago, I-55 follows a northeast–southwest path. In Williamsville, it meets IL 123 near its eastern terminus. It crosses two local roads, providing access to Elkhart and Broadwell before heading north into Lincoln. In Lincoln, I-55 meets the southern terminus of the second I-55 Bus. It then heads due north to intersect IL 10 and the northern terminus of IL 121. One mile (1.6 km) north, it meets the southern terminus of I-155. At this interchange, it heads due east to meet the northern terminus of I-55 Bus. before resuming its northeasterly–southwesterly course through northern Illinois. I-55 meets an interchange with a local road leading to Atlanta, US 136 in McLean, and another local road near Shirley before entering the Bloomington–Normal area.

=== Bloomington to Joliet ===
Once entering Bloomington, I-55 forms a complex interchange with the southern terminus of the final I-55 Bus. to the north and I-74/US 51 to the east. At this interchange, I-74 and US 51 overlap I-55 around the western edge of the cities. The highway has one interchange at US 150 and IL 9. I-74 splits from I-55/US 51 three miles (4.8 km) further north to head toward Peoria and the Moline–Rock Island area. Less than one mile (1.6 km) east, US 51 splits from I-55 to follow I-39 toward the LaSalle–Peru area and toward Rockford. Before leaving Bloomington–Normal, I-55 has two more interchanges with US 51 Business (US 51 Bus.) and I-55 Bus.

From Bloomington to Joliet, I-55 continues its northeasterly–southwesterly trek while skirting the western edges of various towns along the way. It meets local roads connecting Towanda and Lexington, US 24 in Chenoa, IL 116 and IL 23 in Pontiac, a local road to Odell, IL 17 and IL 47 in Dwight, and IL 53 in Gardner.

I-55 starts showing hints of entering the Chicago metropolitan area after the IL 53 interchange. It passes through Forest Preserve areas between Gardner and Joliet. After IL 53, I-55 intersects a local road and IL 113 near Braidwood and meets a partial interchange at IL 129; drivers who want to access IL 129 from southbound I-55 can connect via IL 113. Continuing north, I-55 intersects local roads in industrial areas before entering Channahon. It has two interchanges with Bluff Road and US 6. Two miles (3.2 km) north, it meets I-80, which forms the boundary of Channahon and Joliet.

=== Joliet to Chicago ===
From I-80, I-55 enters the Joliet area by means of Shorewood, with a diverging diamond interchange (DDI) at IL 59 and a full interchange with US 52. It enters Joliet proper with an interchange at US 30. It then connects with IL 126 near Plainfield, forming a partial interchange, then enters the Bolingbrook–Romeoville area, meeting interchanges at Weber Road and IL 53 again.

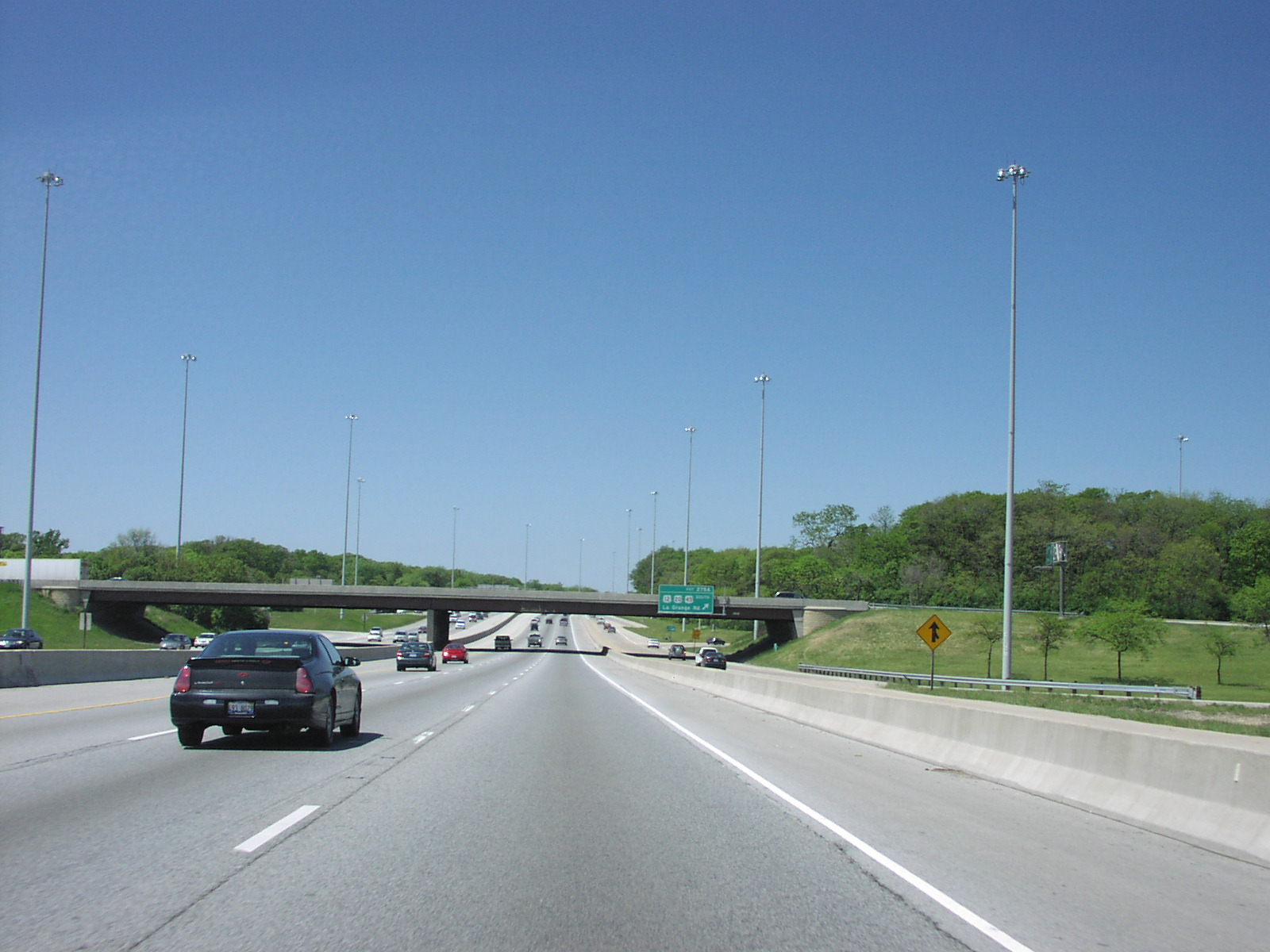
I-55 (Stevenson Expressway) near Countryside, heading southwest

On the border of Romeoville and Lemont, I-55 meets I-355 and a former routing of US 66 at a large, complex interchange. It then meets Lemont Road near Lemont, Cass Avenue and IL 83 near Darien, and County Line Road in Burr Ridge. It enters another large, complex interchange with I-294 and another former routing of US 66 in Indian Head Park. Further east, it meets a large interchange with US 12/US 20/US 45 south of Countryside. About three miles (4.8 km) northeast, it meets a rather large interchange with IL 171 and an interchange with IL 43, both near Summit. After the IL 43 interchange, I-55 enters Chicago.

From IL 43, I-55 meets various city streets (also including one interchange with IL 50, which leads to Midway International Airport) before reaching I-90/I-94 (also known locally as the Dan Ryan Expressway) approximately a mile (1.6 km) west of its terminus. North of I-90/I-94, I-55 intersects various city streets at partial interchanges before reaching its national northern terminus at US 41 (Lake Shore Drive).

== History ==
I-55 in Illinois is the fourth road to connect St. Louis and Chicago. The first was the Pontiac Trail in 1915. This was largely improved and paved as the new IL 4 by 1924. In 1926, IL 4 was designated as the route of the new US 66, and a new section of US 66 was built to bypass slower sections of IL 4 south of Springfield by 1930. Through the 1950s, US 66 was continually widened, straightened, and improved to handle its growing traffic, until its entire length was four lanes wide by 1957.

The roots of I-55 could be traced back to the need of a national highway system. President Dwight D. Eisenhower saw the need of a national network of highways that would help with the mobilization of the army. He had been impressed with the autobahn he saw in Germany during World War II. In 1956, he signed the Federal Aid Highway Act into existence. Although the act provided for a highway replacing US 66, it was spared destruction for a while because of it being more modern than other routes at the time. Illinois would build its first new Interstate Highways on other routes, such as I-80, I-57, and I-70, before turning its attention once again to the St. Louis–Chicago route.

However, during the 1970s, US 66 was finally replaced by I-55 as the fourth St. Louis–Chicago highway, serving most of the same communities along the way as the original Pontiac Trail. It was built in sections across Illinois, often on the original US 66 roadbed. A common construction tactic, where US 66 was already four lanes wide, was to build new southbound lanes for I-55 west of the original road, then rebuild the original southbound lanes of US 66 to be the new northbound lanes for I-55, leaving the original northbound lanes of old US 66 as a two-way frontage road. One can find many signs posted for Historic US 66, especially where it deviates from I-55.

The earliest stretch of I-55 was a portion of US 66 which had already been built as a freeway between Gardner and I-294 (Tri-State Tollway) in Indian Head Park, and which was added to the Interstate System by simply erecting new signs in 1960. Later portions of the highway were built in the 1960s between East St. Louis and Hamel, and bypasses of Springfield and Bloomington-Normal. The rest of the road was completed in the 1970s.

The Stevenson Expressway opened on October 24, 1964, as the Southwest Expressway. It was renamed after Adlai Stevenson II, the former governor of Illinois, on September 1, 1965, a month and a half after his death. The Stevenson's original termini were US 66 in DuPage County to the west and the Dan Ryan Expressway to the east.

In 1999–2000, the expressway was completely rebuilt from Central Avenue north to Lake Shore Drive, including the ramps to the Dan Ryan. The Illinois Department of Transportation (IDOT) was criticized at the time for not adding a fourth lane in each direction to the highway.

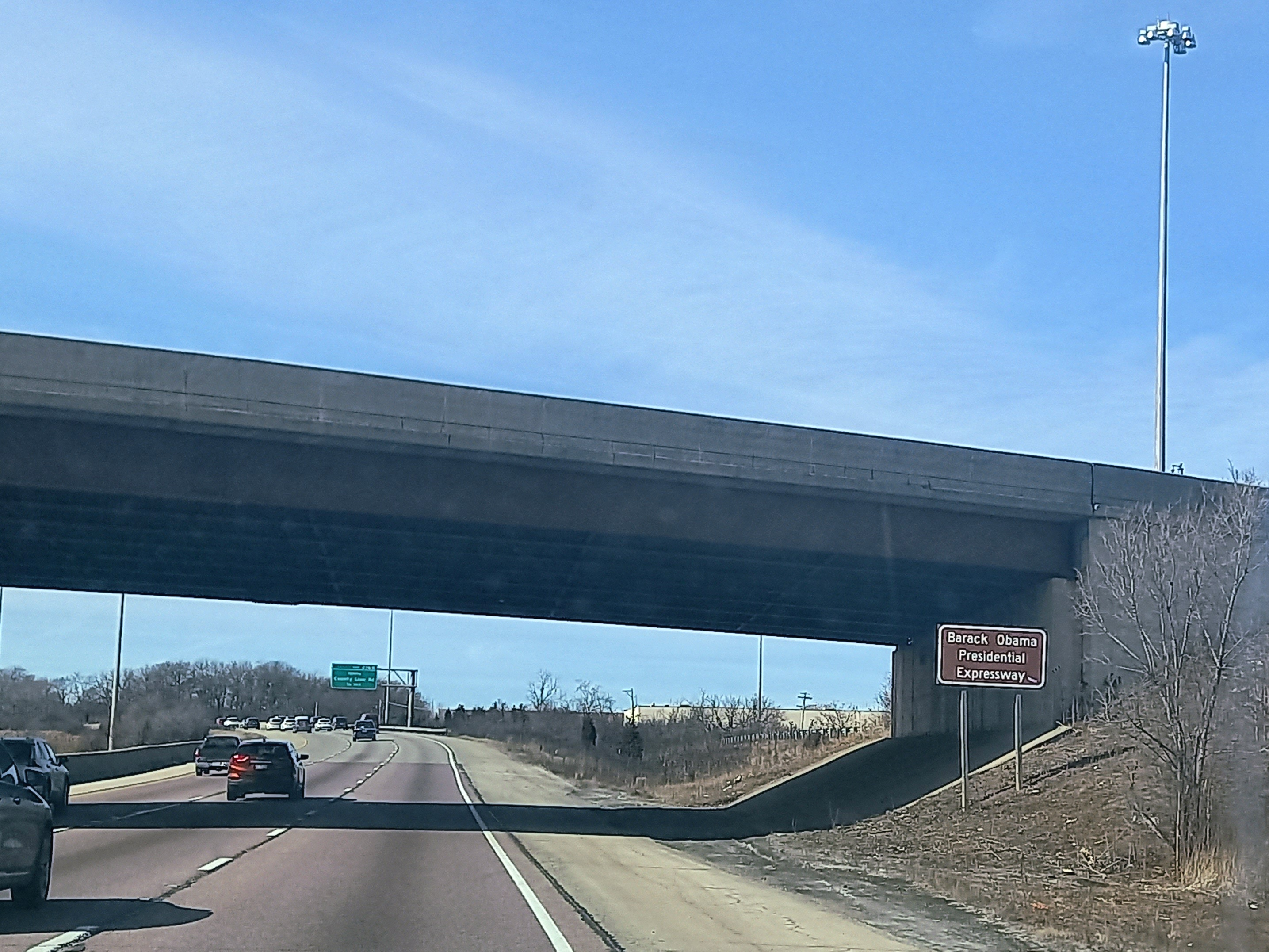
Barack Obama Presidential Expressway sign near I-294

In 2017, the Illinois General Assembly voted to rename approximately 70 miles (110 km) of I-55 from the Tri-State Tollway (I-294) to Pontiac in honor of Barack Obama.

=== Upgrades and later construction ===
Because of the heavy traffic on I-55, IDOT spends millions of dollars per year maintaining the roadway, adding lanes, and replacing bridges to increase the capacity of the highway.

In northeastern Illinois near Joliet, a widening project that expanded I-55 from two to three lanes in each direction between I-80 (exit 250) and Weber Road (exit 263) was completed on October 29, 2008.

In the 2000s, the Damen Avenue (exit 290) and Pulaski Road (exit 287) interchanges were rebuilt as a single-point urban interchange (SPUI) configuration; in 2014, reconstruction as a SPUI was completed for the Central Avenue (exit 285) interchange.

In November 2011, IDOT started a two-year pilot project, allowing Pace bus routes 755 and 855 to ride on the dedicated shoulder lanes in a given time. The bus-on-shoulder service consisted of three sections: from I-355 to County Line Road, I-294 to IL 50, and IL 50 to Kedzie Avenue. In the latter half of 2014, then-Governor Pat Quinn signed a bill which made the I-55 bus on shoulder service permanent. It also allow Pace to expand its bus on shoulder service within and outside I-55.

The Arsenal Road (exit 245) interchange was under complete rebuilding and reconfiguration as of 2012, and the deteriorated overpass at IL 129 (exit 238) was removed in 2012 in anticipation of future construction of a full interchange, temporarily leaving the IL 129 interchange with only a northbound exit and northbound entrance.

At St. Louis, the Stan Musial Veterans Memorial Bridge carrying I-70 across the Mississippi River, and costing $667 million (equivalent to $868 million in 2024), was completed in 2014 to relieve congestion on I-55's Poplar Street Bridge.

Between late 2015 and late 2017, the US 41 (Lake Shore Drive) interchange was being reconstructed to widen two I-55 offramps and its interchange approach.

Between mid-2021 and October 2024, the interchange at I-55 & IL 59 was reconstructed to a diverging diamond interchange (DDI). Although IL 59 ends at I-55, a road expansion south of its terminus (Gateway Boulevard) was constructed. It connects to the Hollywood Casino in Joliet.

== Future ==
In early 2016, Governor Bruce Rauner, as well as IDOT, made a proposal to explore expanding a portion of I-55 (from I-355 to I-90/I-94) by adding an additional lane in each direction to ease congestion. Under their proposal, toll lanes would be constructed and operated through a potential public–private partnership. Noise walls would also be constructed as part of the project.

== Exit list ==
County	Location	mi	km	Exit	Destinations	Notes
Mississippi River		0.0	0.0		I-55 south / I-64 west / US 40 west – St. Louis	Continuation into Missouri
Mississippi River		0.0	0.0	Poplar Street Bridge; Illinois–Missouri line		
St. Clair	East St. Louis	0.6	0.97	1	IL 3 south / Great River Road – Cahokia	Southern end of IL 3/GRR concurrency; exit includes direct exit ramp onto 13th Street / Tudor Avenue
St. Clair	East St. Louis	0.9	1.4	2A	Third Street – Eads Bridge, Casino Queen	Southbound exit and northbound entrance
St. Clair	East St. Louis	1.3	2.1	2B-C	Martin Luther King Bridge – Downtown St. Louis	Signed as exits 2B (left exit) and 2C (right exit); no northbound exits
St. Clair	East St. Louis	2.67	4.30	3A	I-64 east / IL 3 north (St. Clair Avenue) – Louisville	Northern end of I-64/IL 3 concurrency; I-64 exit 3A
St. Clair	East St. Louis	2.88	4.63	3B	I-70 west (Dwight D. Eisenhower Highway) – Kansas City	Southern end of I-70 concurrency; southbound exit and northbound entrance
St. Clair	East St. Louis	2.98	4.80	3C	Exchange Avenue	Southbound exit and northbound entrance; access to Emerson Park MetroLink station
St. Clair	Fairmont City	3.99	6.42	4	IL 203 (Collinsville Road) – Fairmont City, Granite City, Madison	Signed as exits 4A (south) & 4B (north) southbound; access to Gateway Motorsports Park
Madison	Fairmont City	6.32	10.17	6	IL 111 / Great River Road north – Wood River, Washington Park, Pontoon Beach, Fairmont City	Northern end of GRR concurrency; access to Horseshoe Lake State Park and Cahokia Mounds State Historic Site
Madison	Collinsville	8.84	14.23	9	Black Lane	Northbound exit and southbound entrance
Madison	Collinsville	9.86	15.87	10	I-255 – Interstate 270, Memphis	I-255 exit 25; access Cahokia Mounds State Historic Site, Fairmount Race Track, and Our Lady of the Snows Shrine
Madison	Collinsville	11.00	17.70	11	IL 157 (Bluff Road) – Collinsville, Edwardsville, Glen Carbon	Access to Illinois State District 11 Headquarters, Convention Center, and Our Lady of the Snows Shrine
Madison	Maryville	14.55	23.42	15	IL 159 (Center Street, Vandalia Street) – Collinsville, Maryville	Signed as exits 15A (south) & 15B (north)
Madison	Troy	16.91	27.21	17	US 40 east – St. Jacob, Highland	Northern end of US 40 concurrency
Madison	Troy	17.91	28.82	18	IL 162 – Troy	
Madison	Pin Oak Township	19.08	30.71	20A	I-70 east (Dwight D. Eisenhower Highway) – Indianapolis	Northern end of I-70 concurrency
Madison	Pin Oak Township	19.32	31.09	20B	I-270 west – Kansas City	I-270 exit 15
Madison	Edwardsville	22.39	36.03	23	IL 143 – Edwardsville, Marine	
Madison	Hamel	29.57	47.59	30	IL 140 – Alton, Greenville, Hamel	
Madison	Olive Township	33.15	53.35	33	IL 4 – Staunton, Lebanon, Worden	
Madison	Livingston	36.71	59.08	37	New Douglas Road / Nicholls Street – Livingston, New Douglas	
Macoupin	Staunton Township	40.47	65.13	41	Staunton	
Macoupin	White City	44.05	70.89	44	IL 138 – Mount Olive, Benld, White City	
Montgomery	Litchfield	52.35	84.25	52	IL 16 – Gillespie, Litchfield, Hillsboro, Mattoon	
Montgomery	Zanesville Township	59.98	96.53	60	IL 108 west – Carlinville	Eastern terminus of IL 108
Montgomery	Zanesville Township	63.02	101.42	63	IL 48 / IL 127 – Raymond, Taylorville, Hillsboro	Western terminus of IL 48/IL 127
Montgomery	Bois D'Arc Township	71.51	115.08	72	Farmersville, Girard (CR 17)	
Sangamon	Divernon	80.00	128.75	80	Divernon	
Sangamon	Divernon Township	81.53	131.21	82	IL 104 – Pawnee, Auburn	
Sangamon	Ball Township	83.35	134.14	83	Glenarm	Former Historic US 66
Sangamon	Springfield	88.26	142.04	88	East Lake Shore Drive – Chatham	
Sangamon	Springfield	90.16	145.10	90	Toronto Road	
Sangamon	Springfield	91.84	147.80	92A	Historic US 66 east / I-55 BL north (6th Street)	Left exit northbound
Sangamon	Springfield	92.28	148.51	92B	I-72 west / US 36 west (Purple Heart Memorial Highway) – Jacksonville, Quincy	Southern end of I-72/US 36 concurrency; left exit northbound
Sangamon	Springfield	94.42	151.95	94	Stevenson Drive / East Lake Shore Drive	
Sangamon	Springfield	96.37	155.09	96A	IL 29 south – Taylorville	Cloverleaf interchange
Sangamon	Springfield	96.37	155.09	96B	IL 29 north (South Grand Avenue)	Cloverleaf interchange
Sangamon	Springfield	97.47	156.86	98A	I-72 east / US 36 east (Purple Heart Memorial Highway, Penny Severns Memorial Expressway) – Decatur, Champaign, Urbana	Northern end of I-72/US 36 concurrency
Sangamon	Springfield	97.47	156.86	98B	IL 97 west (Clear Lake Avenue)	
Sangamon	Springfield	99.53	160.18	100	IL 54 east / Sangamon Avenue – Clinton	Cloverleaf interchange; signed as exits 100A (IL 54) & 100B (Sangamon Ave.); former US 54; serves Abraham Lincoln Capital Airport
Sangamon	Sherman	104.50	168.18	105	I-55 BL south / Historic US 66 west – Sherman	Southern end of Historic US 66 concurrency; access to Wolf Creek Road and Abraham Lincoln Capital Airport
Sangamon	Williamsville	109.13	175.63	109	IL 123 west / Historic US 66 east – Williamsville, Petersburg	Northern end of Historic US 66 concurrency
Logan	Elkhart	114.56	184.37	115	Elkhart (CR 10)	
Logan	Broadwell Township	119.42	192.19	119	Broadwell (CR 22)	
Logan	Broadwell Township	122.51	197.16	123	I-55 BL north (Lincoln Parkway) – Lincoln	
Logan	West Lincoln Township	125.78	202.42	126	IL 10 / IL 121 south – Lincoln, Mason City	Northern terminus of IL 121; serves Abraham Lincoln Memorial Hospital
Logan	West Lincoln Township	127.04	204.45	127	I-155 north – Peoria, Hartsburg	Left exit and entrance northbound; southern terminus of I-155; I-155 exit 0
Logan	East Lincoln Township	132.21	212.77	133	I-55 BL south (Historic US 66) – Lincoln, Lawndale	
Logan	Atlanta Township	139.81	225.00	140	Atlanta, Lawndale	
McLean	McLean	144.68	232.84	145	US 136 – McLean, Heyworth, Funks Grove	
McLean	Dale Township	153.74	247.42	154	Shirley	
McLean	Bloomington	156.38– 156.85	251.67– 252.43	157	I-74 east (Everett McKinley Dirksen Memorial Highway) / US 51 south – Decatur, Indianapolis I-55 BL north (Veterans Parkway)	Left exit and entrance southbound; signed as exits 157A (I-74/US 51) and 157B (I-55 BL) northbound, no exit number southbound; southern end of I-74/US 51 concurrency
McLean	Bloomington	159.69	257.00	160	US 150 / IL 9 (Market Street) – Pekin	
McLean	Normal	163.32	262.84	163	I-74 west (Everett McKinley Dirksen Memorial Highway) – Peoria	Northern end of I-74 concurrency; I-74 exit 127
McLean	Normal	164.48	264.70	164	I-39 north / US 51 north – Rockford	Northern end of US 51 concurrency; southern terminus of I-39
McLean	Normal	164.81	265.24	165	US 51 Bus. – Bloomington, Normal	Signed as exits 165A (south) & 165B (north) northbound
McLean	Normal	167.36	269.34	167	I-55 BL south (Veterans Parkway) – Central Illinois Regional Airport	
McLean	Towanda	170.99	275.18	171	Towanda (CR 29)	
McLean	Lexington	178.29	286.93	178	Lexington (CR 8)	
McLean	Chenoa	186.60	300.30	187	US 24 – Chenoa, El Paso	
Livingston	Pontiac	196.62	316.43	197	IL 116 – Flanagan, Pontiac	
Livingston	Pontiac	200.46	322.61	201	IL 23 – Pontiac, Streator	To IL 170
Livingston	Odell Township	209.03	336.40	209	Odell (CR 1)	
Livingston	Dwight Township	217.02	349.26	217	IL 17 (Mazon Avenue) – Streator, Kankakee	
Grundy	Goodfarm Township	219.91	353.91	220	IL 47 (Union Street) – Dwight, Morris	
Grundy	Gardner	226.88	365.13	227	IL 53 north – Gardner	Southern terminus of IL 53
Grundy–Will county line	Braidwood	233.42	375.65	233	Reed Road – Braidwood	
Will	Braidwood–Diamond line	235.63	379.21	236	IL 113 – Coal City, Kankakee	
Will	Wilmington Township	238.32	383.54	238	IL 129 south (Washington Street) – Braidwood, Wilmington	Northbound exit and entrance; northern terminus of IL 129
Will	Wilmington Township	240.41	386.90	240	Lorenzo Road	
Will	Wilmington Township	240.97	387.80	241	N. River Road (CR 44 east)	
Will	Channahon Township	243.91	392.54	244	Arsenal Road	Chicagoland Speedway
Will	Channahon	246.67	396.98	247	Bluff Road (CR 77 west)	
Will	Channahon	248.15	399.36	248	US 6 (Eames Street) – Joliet, Morris	
Will	Channahon	250.25	402.74	250	I-80 – Iowa, Indiana	Signed as exits 250A (east) & 250B (west); I-80 exit 126
Will	Shorewood	251.40	404.59	251	IL 59 north (Gateway Boulevard) – Shorewood, Plainfield	Rebuilt to a diverging-diamond interchange (DDI) on October 7, 2024; southern terminus of IL 59
Will	Shorewood–Joliet line	252.79	406.83	253	US 52 (Jefferson Street) – Joliet, Shorewood	
Will	Joliet–Plainfield line	257.41	414.26	257	US 30 / Lincoln Highway (Plainfield Road) – Aurora, Joliet	
Will	Plainfield	261.08	420.17	261	IL 126 west (Main Street) – Plainfield	Southbound exit and northbound entrance; eastern terminus of IL 126
Will	Romeoville–Bolingbrook line	263.43	423.95	263	Weber Road (CR 88)	Rebuilt from a diamond interchange to a Diverging Diamond Interchange (DDI) in 2022
Will	Bolingbrook	267.02	429.73	267	IL 53 (Bolingbrook Drive) – Bolingbrook, Romeoville	
Will–DuPage county line	Bolingbrook–Woodridge line	268.73	432.48	268	Joliet Road south (Historic US 66 west)	Southbound exit and northbound entrance; southern end of Historic US 66 concurrency
Will–DuPage county line	Bolingbrook–Woodridge line	269.34	433.46	269	I-355 Toll (Veterans Memorial Tollway) – Southwest Suburbs, Northwest Suburbs	I-355 exit 12
DuPage	Darien	270.85	435.89	271	Lemont Road (CR 9)	Signed as exits 271A (south) & 271B (north)
DuPage	Darien	272.86	439.13	273	Cass Avenue (CR 15)	Signed as exits 273A (south) & 273B (north); serves Argonne National Laboratory
DuPage	Willowbrook–Burr Ridge line	274.50	441.76	274	IL 83 (Kingery Highway)	Signed as exits 274A (south) & 274B (north)
DuPage–Cook county line	Burr Ridge	276.33	444.71	276	County Line Road	Signed as exits 276A (south) & 276B (north)
Cook	Indian Head Park	276.80	445.47	276C	Joliet Road (Historic US 66 east)	Northbound exit and southbound entrance; northern end of Historic US 66 concurrency; south end of Stevenson Expressway
Cook	Indian Head Park–Countryside line	277.57	446.71	277	I-294 Toll (Tri-State Tollway) – Wisconsin, Indiana	Signed as exits 277A (north) & 277B (south); I-294 exit 23; no southbound exit to I-294 south
Cook	Countryside–Hodgkins line	278.87	448.80	279	US 12 / US 20 / US 45 (La Grange Road) to I-294 Toll south	Signed as exits 279A (east/south) & 279B (west/north)
Cook	Summit	282.29	454.30	282	IL 171 (Archer Avenue)	Signed as exits 282A (south) & 282B (north) northbound; Brookfield Zoo
Cook	Summit–Forest View line	283.40	456.09	283	IL 43 (Harlem Avenue)	
Cook	Stickney–Chicago line	285.57	459.58	285	Central Avenue (5600 West)	
Cook	Chicago	286.67	461.35	286	IL 50 (Cicero Avenue, 4800 West) – Chicago Midway Airport	
Cook	Chicago	287.74	463.07	287	Pulaski Road (4000 West)	
Cook	Chicago	288.83	464.83	288	Kedzie Avenue (3200 West)	Southbound exit and northbound entrance
Cook	Chicago	289.37	465.70	289	California Avenue (2800 West)	Northbound exit and southbound entrance
Cook	Chicago	290.44– 290.96	467.42– 468.25	290	Damen Avenue (2000 West) / Ashland Avenue (1600 West)	Northbound exit and southbound entrance for Ashland Avenue
Cook	Chicago	292.34	470.48	292	I-90 / I-94 (Dan Ryan Expressway) – Indiana, Wisconsin	Signed as exits 292A (west) & 292B (east) northbound, and as exits 292 (west) & 293B (east) southbound
Cook	Chicago	292.91	471.39	293A	Cermak Road – Chinatown	Northbound exit and southbound entrance
Cook	Chicago	293.13	471.75	293C	State Street	Southbound exit and northbound entrance
Cook	Chicago	293.61	472.52	293D	Martin L. King Drive – McCormick Place	Northbound exit and southbound entrance
Cook	Chicago	293.88	472.95	—	US 41 / LMCT (Lake Shore Drive)	Northern terminus of I-55/Stevenson Expressway; no trucks must exit onto US 41 north; all trucks must exit onto US 41 south
1.000 mi = 1.609 km; 1.000 km = 0.621 mi: Concurrency terminus; Incomplete access

== Related routes ==
=== Auxiliary routes ===
I-55 has three auxiliary routes in Illinois:

- I-155: A spur from I-55 in Lincoln to I-74 just east of Peoria.
- I-255: The eastern third of the beltway around the St. Louis Metro Area (with I-270 forming the other two-thirds)
- I-355: The Veterans Memorial Tollway, serving the western and southwestern suburbs of Chicago, running from I-80 in New Lenox to I-290 in Addison
- I-55 BL: I-55 has three business loops in Illinois.

Interstate 55
Previous state: Missouri	Illinois	Next state: Terminus
