= Illinois Route 113 =

State highway in Illinois, United States

Illinois Route 113
- Division Street; Main Street
- IL 113 highlighted in red

Route information
- Maintained by IDOT
- Length: 33.95 mi (54.64 km)
- Existed: 1924–present

Major junctions
- Northwest end: IL 47 in Mazon
- I-55 in Braidwood
- Southeast end: IL 17 in Kankakee

Location
- Country: United States
- State: Illinois
- Counties: Grundy, Will, Kankakee

Highway system
- Illinois State Highway System; Interstate; US; State; Tollways; Scenic
← IL 111	→ IL 114

Illinois Route 113 (IL 113) is a 33.95-mile-long (54.64 km) two-lane state route that runs east from IL 47 north of Mazon and east of Seneca to IL 17 in western Kankakee, just across the Kankakee River from U.S. Route 45 (US 45) and US 52.

== Route description ==
Route 113 begins at a junction with Route 47 in Grundy County north of Mazon. From here, the route heads east through a rural area before passing through Coal City and Diamond. At the eastern edge of Diamond, Route 113 meets Interstate 55. Past this junction, the route turns southward, entering Braidwood along Division Street. The highway turns east onto Main Street and intersects Illinois Route 129 and Illinois Route 53 at separate junctions. After leaving Braidwood to the east, Route 113 follows the southern bank of the Kankakee River; Illinois Route 102 parallels this stretch of the route on the northern bank of the river. At Custer Park, the route crosses the Wauponsee Glacial Trail. Past Custer Park, the route runs past Kankakee River State Park. It then meets County Route 20, which crosses the river and connects Route 113 to Route 102. Past this junction, Route 113 enters Kankakee County. The road continues to follow the river into Kankakee, where it terminates at Route 17.

== History ==
SBI Route 113 first appeared in 1928, running along the south bank of the Kankakee River from Wilmington to Kankakee. In 1930, the IL 113 designation was applied to another road on the north bank of the river, connecting from Wilmington to Bourbonnais. In 1931, IL 113 was extended west from Wilmington to IL 47 through Coal City. In 1934, the route southeast of Wilmington was split into Illinois Route 113N and Illinois Route 113S, with 113N as the northern route and 113S as the southern. Between 1935 and 1940, however, IL 113 and IL 113S were replaced with the extension of US 52, resulting in IL 113N being redesignated as IL 113. After US 52 was rerouted through Joliet in 1940, the north and south alignments were restored, but IL 113S went further west to IL 47 via the pre-1935 routing of IL 113. In 1961, IL 113S and IL 113N were redesignated as IL 113 and IL 102, respectively.

== Major intersections ==
County	Location	mi	km	Destinations	Notes
Grundy	Mazon	0.00	0.00	IL 47	Northwestern terminus of IL 113
Will	Diamond	9.85	15.85	I-55 (Barack Obama Presidential Expressway) – Bloomington, Joliet	exit 236 on I-55
Will	Braidwood	12.48	20.08	IL 129 north (Washington Street)	Southern terminus of IL 129
Will	Braidwood	12.56	20.21	IL 53 (Front Street) / Historic US 66	
Kankakee	Kankakee	33.95	54.64	IL 17 (Court Street)	Southeastern terminus of IL 113
1.000 mi = 1.609 km; 1.000 km = 0.621 mi

== See also ==
- List of state highways in Illinois
