= Illinois Route 7 =

State highway in Will and Cook Counties, Illinois, US

Illinois Route 7
- IL 7 highlighted in red

Route information
- Maintained by IDOT
- Length: 28.06 mi (45.16 km)
- Existed: November 5, 1918–present

Major junctions
- Southwest end: US 6 in Rockdale
- I-80 in Joliet; US 52 in Joliet; US 30 in Crest Hill; IL 53 in Lockport; I-355 Toll in Lockport; US 6 in Orland Park; US 45 in Orland Park
- Northeast end: IL 43 in Worth

Location
- Country: United States
- State: Illinois
- Counties: Will, Cook

Highway system
- Illinois State Highway System; Interstate; US; State; Tollways; Scenic
← IL 6	→ IL 8

Illinois Route 7 (IL 7, Illinois 7) is a northeast–southwest state route in northeastern Illinois. Currently, IL 7 runs from U.S. Route 6 (US 6) at Rockdale north through Joliet, and Crest Hill into Lockport, and then east to Orland Park before terminating at IL 43 in Worth. IL 7 runs for about 28.06 miles (45.16 km).

== Route description ==
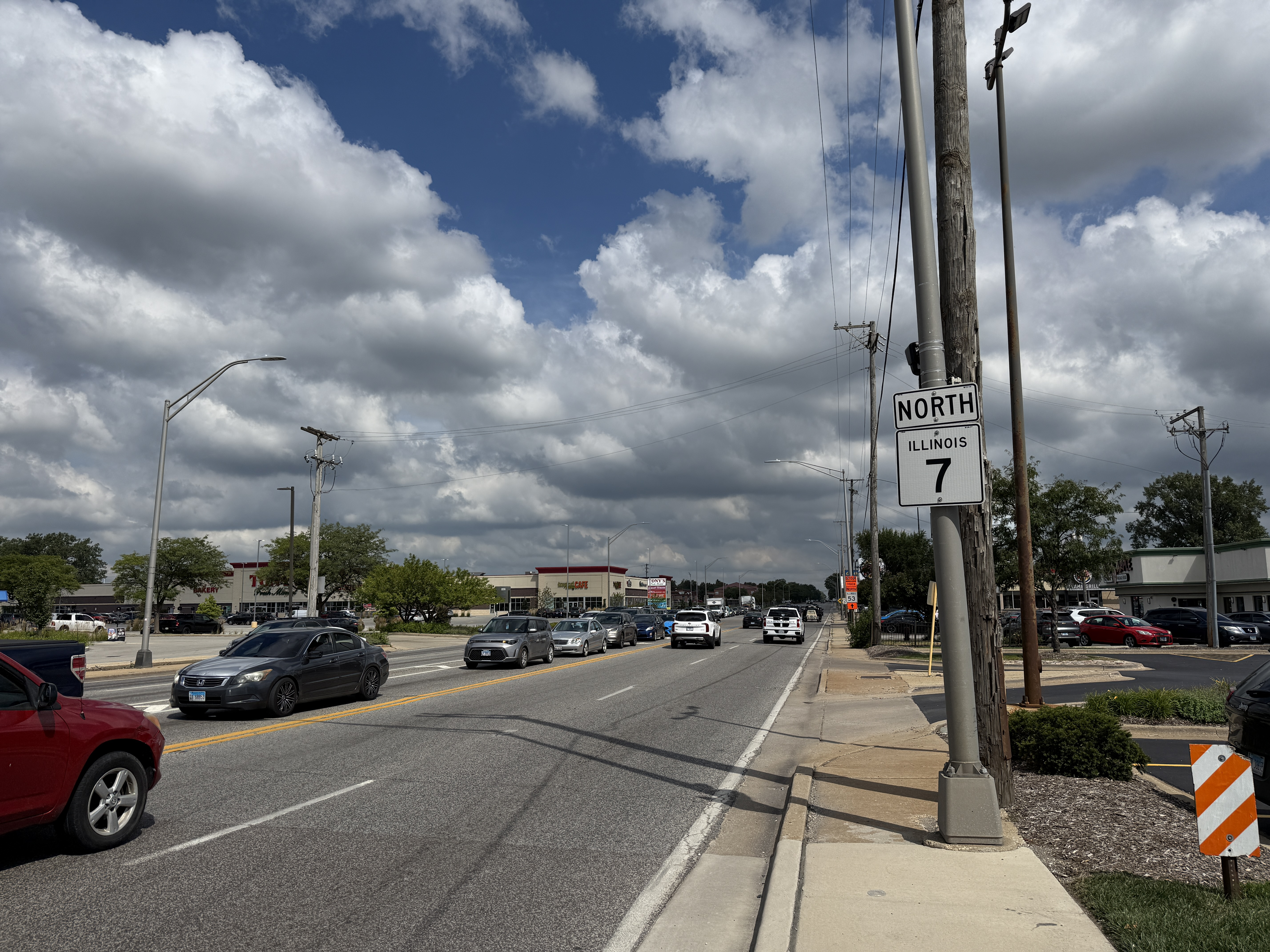
IL 7 northbound past US 52 in Joliet

IL 7 follows large portions of the Southwest Highway, one of the original routes from Chicago to Joliet.

IL 7 runs along many major streets and overlaps several other routes. It joins with IL 53 in Crest Hill, US 30 (Plainfield Road) in Crest Hill and with US 6 at 159th Street between Lockport and Orland Park. Between Rockdale and Worth, IL 7 runs via old US 66, 159th Street, 143rd Street, Wolf Road, Southwest Highway, and Larkin Avenue, among many others.

== History ==
SBI Route 7 originally ran from East Moline to Chicago, mostly on current US 6 and IL 7. When US 6 was designated, IL 7 was dropped west of what is now Orland Park. In 1967, it was dropped in the city limits of Chicago (terminating in Oak Lawn, and also extended to IL 53 in Lockport. Two years later, it was extended to Rockdale. In 1970, the eastern end was cut back to its current terminus.

== Major intersections ==
County	Location	mi	km	Destinations	Notes
Will	Rockdale	0.0	0.0	US 6 (Grand Army of the Republic Highway)	Southern terminus
Will	Joliet	1.0	1.6	I-80 – Moline, Rock Island, Gary	I-80 Exit 130
Will	Joliet	1.8	2.9	US 52 (Jefferson Street)	
Will	Joliet	4.0	6.4	US 30 / Lincoln Highway (Plainfield Road)	
Will	Crest Hill	5.7	9.2	IL 53 south (Broadway Street) / Historic US 66 west / I&M Canal Passage west – Joliet	Southwest end of IL 53/Historic US 66/I&M Canal Passage overlap
Will	Romeoville	8.7	14.0	IL 53 north (Independence Boulevard) / Historic US 66 east	Northeast end of IL 53/Historic US 66 overlap
Will	Lockport	9.7	15.6	IL 171 (State Street) / I&M Canal Passage east	Northeast end of I&M Canal Passage overlap
Will	Lockport	12.4	20.0	I-355 Toll (Veterans Memorial Tollway) – Southwest Suburbs, West Suburbs	I-355 exit 4
Cook	Orland Park	18.6	29.9	US 6 (Wolf Road, 159th Street) – Joliet, Indiana	
Cook	Orland Park	22.7	36.5	US 45 (La Grange Road, 96th Avenue)	Access via 135th and 143rd Streets
Cook	Palos Park	25.3	40.7	123rd Street, McCarthy Road	Interchange
Cook	Palos Park	26.2	42.2	IL 83 (Cal Sag Road, College Drive) / CR W32 south (80th Avenue)	
Cook	Worth	28.2	45.4	IL 43 (Harlem Avenue); Southwest Highway	Northern terminus; roadway continues as Southwest Highway
1.000 mi = 1.609 km; 1.000 km = 0.621 mi: Concurrency terminus; Electronic toll collection
