= Chaney-Monge School District 88 =

School district in Illinois, United States

Address
- 400 Elsie Avenue Crest Hill, Illinois, 60403; United States
- Coordinates: 41°33′36.6″N 88°5′36.4″W

District information
- Type: Public
- Grades: K–8
- NCES District ID: 1709510

Students and staff
- Students: 457

Other information
- Website: chaneymonge.us

Chaney-Monge School District 88 is a school district headquartered in Crest Hill, Illinois, near Chicago. It operates a single school, Chaney-Monge School, which serves grades K-8.
