= Illinois Route 129 =

State highway in Will County, Illinois, US

Illinois Route 129
- Washington Street
- IL 129 highlighted in red

Route information
- Maintained by IDOT
- Length: 4.06 mi (6.53 km)
- Existed: 1960–present

Major junctions
- South end: IL 113 in Braidwood
- North end: I-55 in Braidwood

Location
- Country: United States
- State: Illinois
- Counties: Will

Highway system
- Illinois State Highway System; Interstate; US; State; Tollways; Scenic
← IL 128	→ IL 130

Illinois Route 129 (IL 129) is a 4.06-mile-long (6.53 km) north–south state route in northeastern Illinois. It runs from IL 113 in downtown Braidwood north to Interstate 55 (I-55).

== Route description ==
IL 129 begins at a four-way intersection with IL 113 in Braidwood. The highway is an undivided two-lane surface road for its entire length. It heads northeast as Washington Street, parallel to the Union Pacific Railroad tracks and IL 53. Northeast of Braidwood, IL 129 curves northward and away from IL 53. It continues north until it terminates at an interchange with I-55. Northbound traffic on IL 129 can only enter northbound I-55, and the only access to IL 129 is from northbound I-55.

== History ==
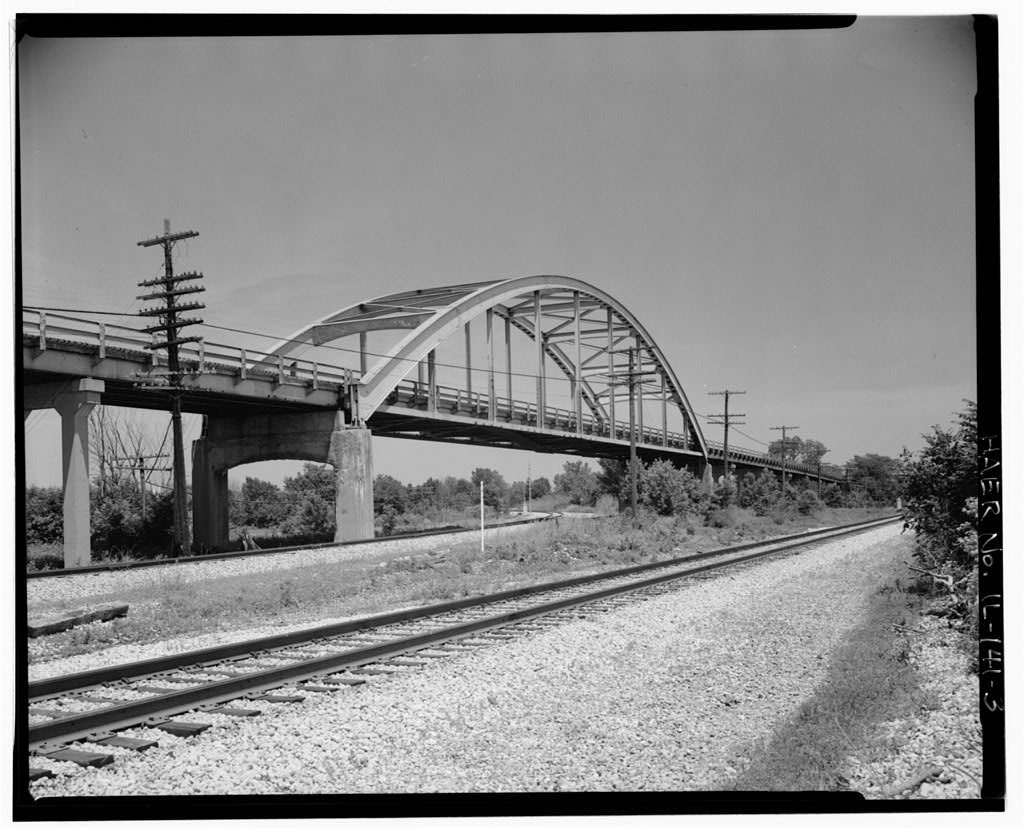
Lost Braceville US 66/IL 129 bridge. More photos here.

SBI Route 129 originally ran from Effingham to Windsor. It was replaced by Illinois Route 32 in 1937.

In 1957, the number was reused for a former alignment of U.S. Route 66 that ran from Gardner to Wilmington, when US 66 was rerouted onto a new freeway alignment that passed to the west of Braceville and Braidwood. That new alignment eventually became I-55.

In 1995, a section of the highway south of Braidwood was closed to through traffic when a deteriorated bowstring arch bridge over a railroad line was deemed too expensive to repair. From 1995 until 1996, the Route 129 designation was moved to the other side of the railroad tracks, where it shared alignment with Illinois Route 53. This designation was dropped in 1996.

On October 1, 2011, the deteriorated overpass at the interchange with I-55 was closed and removed, as was the previous U-turn ramp approximately 0.25 miles (0.40 km) north of the interchange so vehicles from IL 129 could access southbound I-55. This temporarily leaves this interchange with only an exit from northbound I-55 to southbound IL 129, and an entrance from northbound IL 129 to northbound I-55. A new full interchange is planned here in the future.

== Major intersections ==
The entire route is in Braidwood, Will County.

mi	km	Destinations	Notes
0.00	0.00	IL 113 (Main Street) to IL 53 / Historic US 66	Southeast to IL-53/Historic US 66, southern terminus
2.20	3.54	To IL 113 (Coal City Road)	
3.20	5.15	CR 29 west (Strip Mine Road)	Western terminus of CR 29
4.06	6.53	I-55 north	Access from/to northbound I-55 only, northern terminus
1.000 mi = 1.609 km; 1.000 km = 0.621 mi

== See also ==
- List of state highways in Illinois
