= Martinton Township, Iroquois County, Illinois =

Martinton Township
- Township
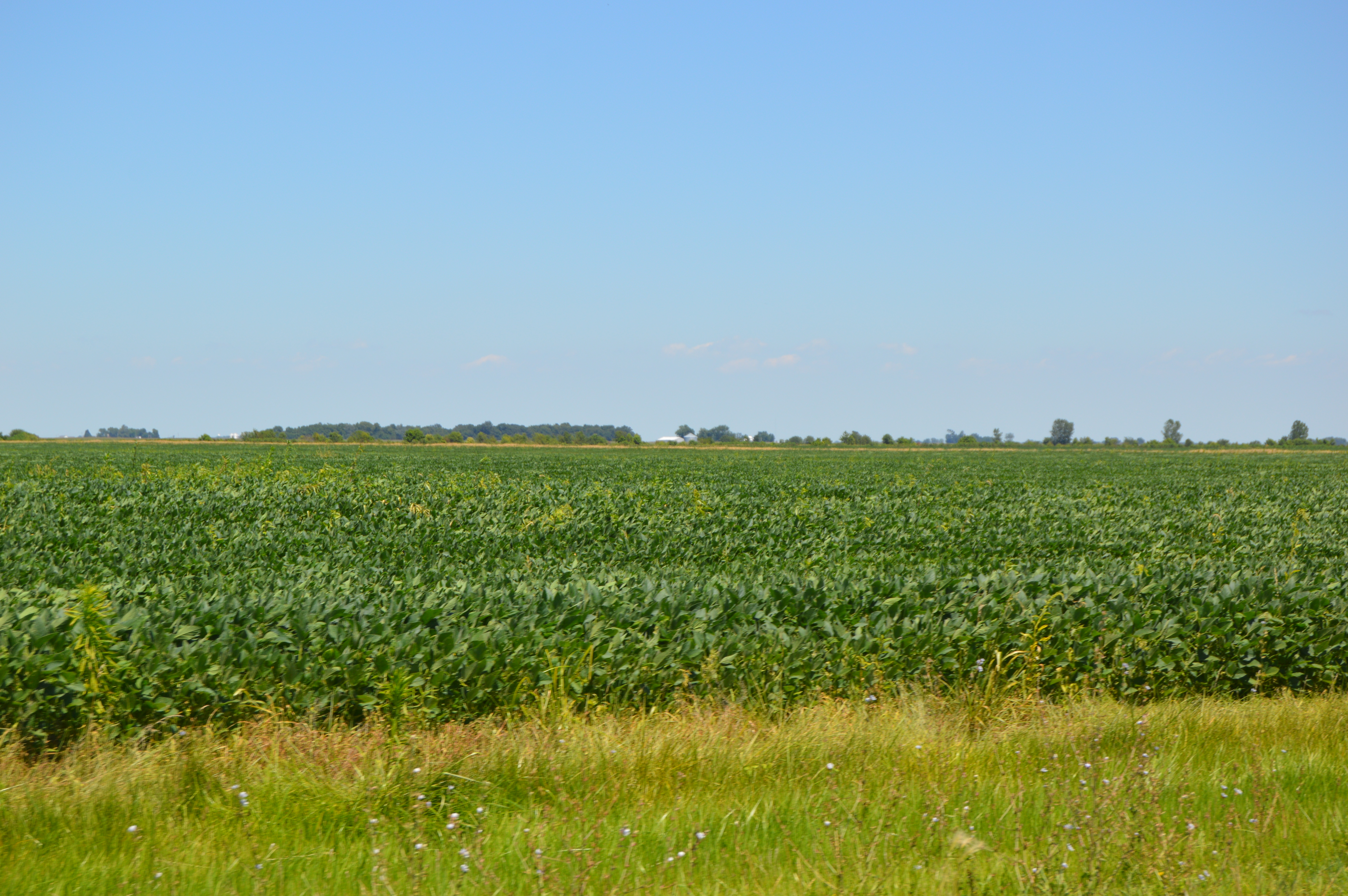
- Fields along U.S. Route 52, southwest of Martinton

- Location in Iroquois County

- Iroquois County's location in Illinois
- Coordinates: 40°54′04″N 87°44′18″W
- Country: United States
- State: Illinois
- County: Iroquois
- Established: September 1857

Area
  - Total: 54.41 sq mi (140.9 km^{2})
  - Land: 54.22 sq mi (140.4 km^{2})
  - Water: 0.19 sq mi (0.49 km^{2}) 0.34%
- Elevation: 620 ft (190 m)

Population (2020)
  - Total: 813
  - Density: 15.0/sq mi (5.79/km^{2})
- Time zone: UTC-6 (CST)
  - Summer (DST): UTC-5 (CDT)
- ZIP codes: 60912, 60931, 60951, 60970
- FIPS code: 17-075-47293

Martinton Township is one of twenty-six townships in Iroquois County, Illinois, USA. As of the 2020 census, its population was 813 and it contained 379 housing units. Buchanan Township formed from a portion of Papineau Township, then known as Wygant Township, in September 1857; its name was changed to Martinton Township on an unknown date.

== Geography ==
According to the 2021 census gazetteer files, Martinton Township has a total area of 54.41 square miles (140.92 km^{2}), of which 54.22 square miles (140.43 km^{2}) (or 99.66%) is land and 0.19 square miles (0.49 km^{2}) (or 0.34%) is water.

=== Cities, towns, villages ===
- Martinton

=== Extinct towns ===
- Freedville at 40.860868°N 87.74309°W

=== Cemeteries ===
The township contains these four cemeteries: Greentown, Mount Olivet, Old Burg and Teege.

=== Major highways ===
- U.S. Route 52
- Illinois Route 1

== Demographics ==
As of the 2020 census there were 813 people, 374 households, and 261 families residing in the township. The population density was 14.94 inhabitants per square mile (5.77/km^{2}). There were 379 housing units at an average density of 6.97 per square mile (2.69/km^{2}). The racial makeup of the township was 92.13% White, 1.48% African American, 0.12% Native American, 0.62% Asian, 0.00% Pacific Islander, 0.74% from other races, and 4.92% from two or more races. Hispanic or Latino of any race were 2.95% of the population.

There were 374 households, out of which 28.90% had children under the age of 18 living with them, 52.67% were married couples living together, 5.35% had a female householder with no spouse present, and 30.21% were non-families. 24.90% of all households were made up of individuals, and 4.50% had someone living alone who was 65 years of age or older. The average household size was 2.42 and the average family size was 2.70.

The township's age distribution consisted of 22.1% under the age of 18, 5.1% from 18 to 24, 27.4% from 25 to 44, 30% from 45 to 64, and 15.3% who were 65 years of age or older. The median age was 38.1 years. For every 100 females, there were 148.4 males. For every 100 females age 18 and over, there were 129.3 males.

The median income for a household in the township was $73,750, and the median income for a family was $88,438. Males had a median income of $59,750 versus $17,321 for females. The per capita income for the township was $33,651. About 10.3% of families and 16.3% of the population were below the poverty line, including 27.7% of those under age 18 and 12.3% of those age 65 or over.

Historical population
Census	Pop.	Note	%±
2000	1,100		—
2010	943		−14.3%
2020	813		−13.8%
U.S. Decennial Census

== School districts ==
- Donovan Community Unit School District 3
- Iroquois County Community Unit School District 9

== Political districts ==
- Illinois' 15th congressional district
- State House District 79
- State Senate District 40
