= Illinois Route 102 =

State highway in Will and Kankakee counties in Illinois, US

Illinois Route 102

Route information
- Maintained by IDOT
- Length: 18.33 mi (29.50 km)
- Existed: 1924–present

Major junctions
- West end: IL 53 in Wilmington
- East end: US 45 / US 52 in Bourbonnais

Location
- Country: United States
- State: Illinois
- Counties: Will, Kankakee

Highway system
- Illinois State Highway System; Interstate; US; State; Tollways; Scenic
← IL 101	→ IL 103

Illinois Route 102 (IL 102) is a state route in northeast Illinois. It runs from IL 53 in Wilmington to the concurrency of U.S. Route 45 (US 45) and US 52 in Bourbonnais, just north of Kankakee. This is a distance of 18.33 miles (29.50 km).

== Route description ==
IL 102 runs parallel to and north of the Kankakee River for its entire length. For two miles (3.2 km), IL 102 is located next to the Kankakee River State Park. Entrances to the park's two major campgrounds are located off Illinois 102.

IL 113 takes a mostly parallel route, but on the south side of the river.

The road is two lanes for its entire length, except for a four-lane stretch with center turn lanes measuring approximately one and a half miles (2.4 km) near its eastern end in Bourbonnais. A center turn lane also exists within a two-lane section for a few blocks inside the city of Wilmington.

== History ==
Illinois Route 113N
- Location: Wilmington–Bourbonnais, Illinois
- Existed: 1940–1961

IL 102 and IL 113 were both established in 1924, and originally both routes were numbered as IL 113. In 1935, IL 113 north of the river became IL 113N, and the south branch became IL 113S. From 1936 to 1940, US 52 was formed to run along IL 113S, renumbering IL 113N to IL 113. In 1940, US 52 was rerouted to go through downtown Joliet, reverting to the IL 113N and IL 113S layout. In 1961, Illinois 113N was renumbered as IL 102, and IL 113S became IL 113 again.

== Major intersections ==
County	Location	mi	km	Destinations	Notes
Will	Wilmington	0.00	0.00	IL 53 (Baltimore Street) / Historic US 66 – Joliet, Pontiac	
Kankakee	Bourbonnais	18.33	29.50	US 45 / US 52 (Marsile Street) – Kankakee, Joliet, Frankfort	
1.000 mi = 1.609 km; 1.000 km = 0.621 mi
