= Martinton, Illinois =

- Village
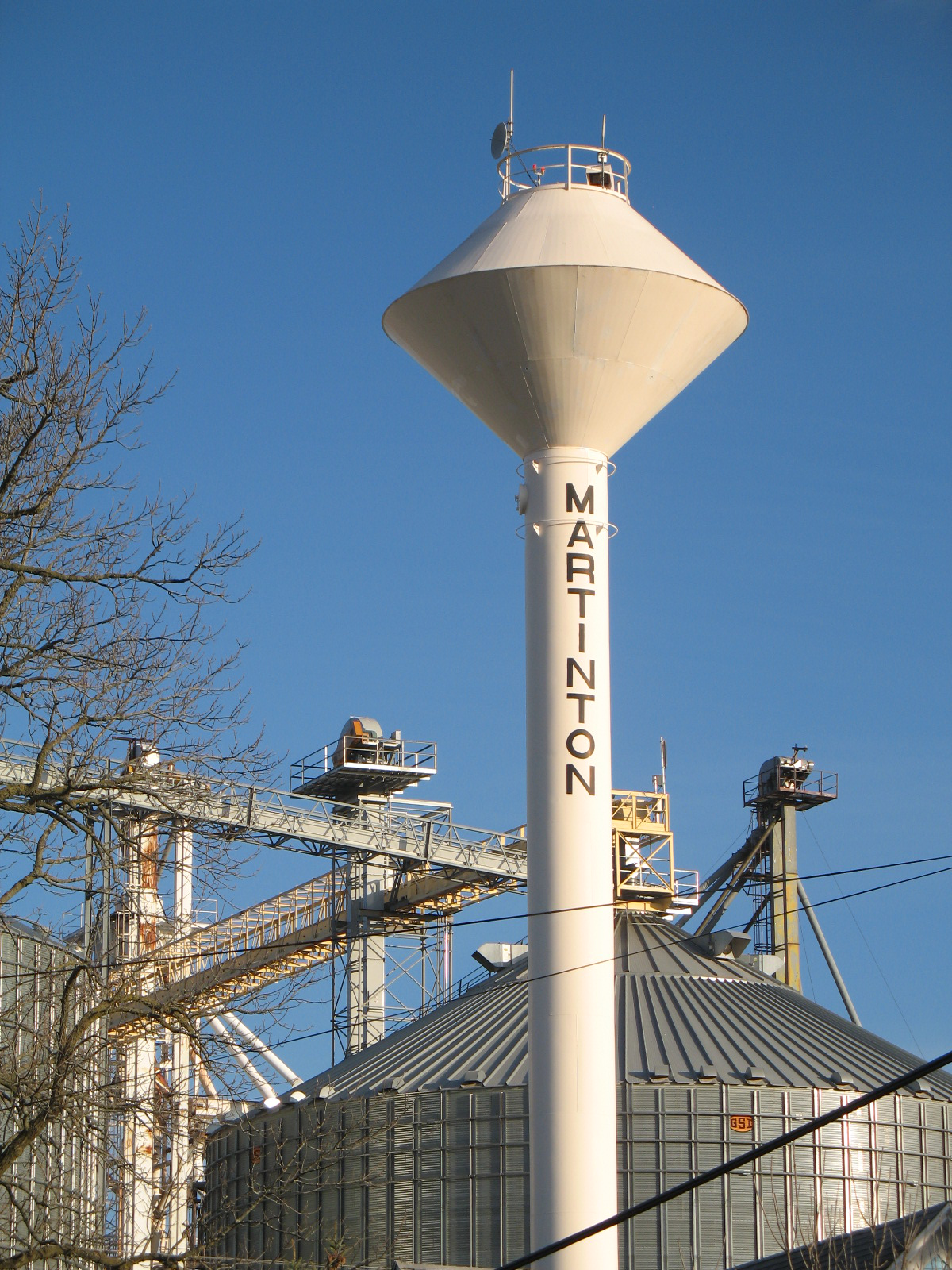
- Martinton water tower

- Location in Iroquois County, Illinois

- Location in Iroquois County
- Coordinates: 40°54′57″N 87°43′31″W
- Country: United States
- State: Illinois
- County: Iroquois
- Township: Martinton

Area
  - Total: 0.27 sq mi (0.71 km^{2})
  - Land: 0.27 sq mi (0.71 km^{2})
  - Water: 0 sq mi (0.00 km^{2})
- Elevation: 623 ft (190 m)

Population (2020)
  - Total: 334
  - Density: 1,217.2/sq mi (469.98/km^{2})
- Time zone: UTC-6 (CST)
  - Summer (DST): UTC-5 (CDT)
- ZIP code: 60951
- Area code: 815
- FIPS code: 17-47280
- GNIS feature ID: 2399268

Martinton is a village in Martinton Township, Iroquois County, Illinois, United States. The population was 334 at the 2020 census.

== Geography ==
Martinton is located in northeastern Iroquois County. Illinois Route 1 follows the western border of the village, leading north 8 miles (13 km) to St. Anne and south 10 miles (16 km) to Watseka, the Iroquois County seat.

According to the 2021 census gazetteer files, Martinton has a total area of 0.27 square miles (0.70 km^{2}), all land.

== Demographics ==
Historical population
Census	Pop.	Note	%±
1880	142		—
1890	125		−12.0%
1900	319		155.2%
1910	312		−2.2%
1920	250		−19.9%
1930	261		4.4%
1940	280		7.3%
1950	292		4.3%
1960	314		7.5%
1970	278		−11.5%
1980	363		30.6%
1990	299		−17.6%
2000	375		25.4%
2010	381		1.6%
2020	334		−12.3%
U.S. Decennial Census

As of the 2020 census there were 334 people, 142 households, and 105 families residing in the village. The population density was 1,218.98 inhabitants per square mile (470.65/km^{2}). There were 138 housing units at an average density of 503.65 per square mile (194.46/km^{2}). The racial makeup of the village was 92.51% White, 0.30% African American, 0.30% Native American, 0.30% Asian, 0.00% Pacific Islander, 1.20% from other races, and 5.39% from two or more races. Hispanic or Latino of any race were 3.59% of the population.

There were 142 households, out of which 32.4% had children under the age of 18 living with them, 58.45% were married couples living together, 11.27% had a female householder with no husband present, and 26.06% were non-families. 21.83% of all households were made up of individuals, and 6.34% had someone living alone who was 65 years of age or older. The average household size was 2.85 and the average family size was 2.44.

The village's age distribution consisted of 23.4% under the age of 18, 8.1% from 18 to 24, 17.9% from 25 to 44, 35% from 45 to 64, and 15.6% who were 65 years of age or older. The median age was 45.2 years. For every 100 females, there were 126.1 males. For every 100 females age 18 and over, there were 115.4 males.

The median income for a household in the village was $65,625, and the median income for a family was $68,750. Males had a median income of $52,917 versus $29,688 for females. The per capita income for the village was $25,608. About 25.7% of families and 27.5% of the population were below the poverty line, including 56.8% of those under age 18 and 31.5% of those age 65 or over.
