= Illinois Route 53 =

State highway in northeastern Illinois, US

Illinois Route 53
- IL 53 highlighted in red

Route information
- Maintained by IDOT
- Length: 82.02 mi (132.00 km)
- Existed: 1924–present

Major junctions
- South end: I-55 in Gardner
- I-80 in Joliet; Historic US 66 / IL 7 in Lockport; I-88 Toll / IL 110 (CKC) in Lisle; IL 390 Toll in Itasca; I-290 in Elk Grove Village; I-90 Toll / I-290 in Rolling Meadows
- North end: IL 83 in Long Grove

Location
- Country: United States
- State: Illinois
- Counties: Grundy, Will, DuPage, Cook, Lake

Highway system
- Illinois State Highway System; Interstate; US; State; Tollways; Scenic
← US 52	→ US 54

Illinois Route 53 (IL 53) is an arterial north–south state highway in northeast Illinois. IL 53 runs from Main Street west of historic U.S. Route 66 (US 66) in Gardner to IL 83 in Long Grove, a distance of 82.02 miles (132.00 km). It mainly cuts through the western suburbs of Chicago, passes through Bolingbrook, Romeoville, Crest Hill and Joliet, merging into I-55 at Gardner.

== Route description ==
IL 53 begins at the County Road 29 (CR 29) and I-55 interchange and heads east in Gardner. At the first intersection, the route runs along the path of historic US 66 for about 0.3 miles (0.48 km) before making a right and leaving former US 66. The route continues east and loops around Gardner before heading northeast, running parallel with I-55. It crosses over the Mazon River before passing through Braceville and Godley. In Braidwood, the highway intersects IL 113 and runs parallel with IL 129. IL 129 moves away from IL 53 before entering the Hitts Siding Prairie Nature Preserve. IL 53 the crosses over the Kankakee River before intersecting the northern terminus of IL 102 in Wilmington. The route then continues north through the Midewin National Tallgrass Prairie, passing by the Abraham Lincoln National Cemetery and the former Joliet Arsenal in Elwood. From Elwood to Joliet, the route follows the old alignment of US 66, becoming concurrent with US 52 for nearly a mile. It also intersects I-80 before separating from US 52 and running concurrently with US 6 entering downtown. At the intersection of US 30, IL 53 separates from US 6 and continues north. It crosses over the Des Plaines River before running concurrently with IL 7 and passing by the Stateville Correctional Center in Crest Hill.

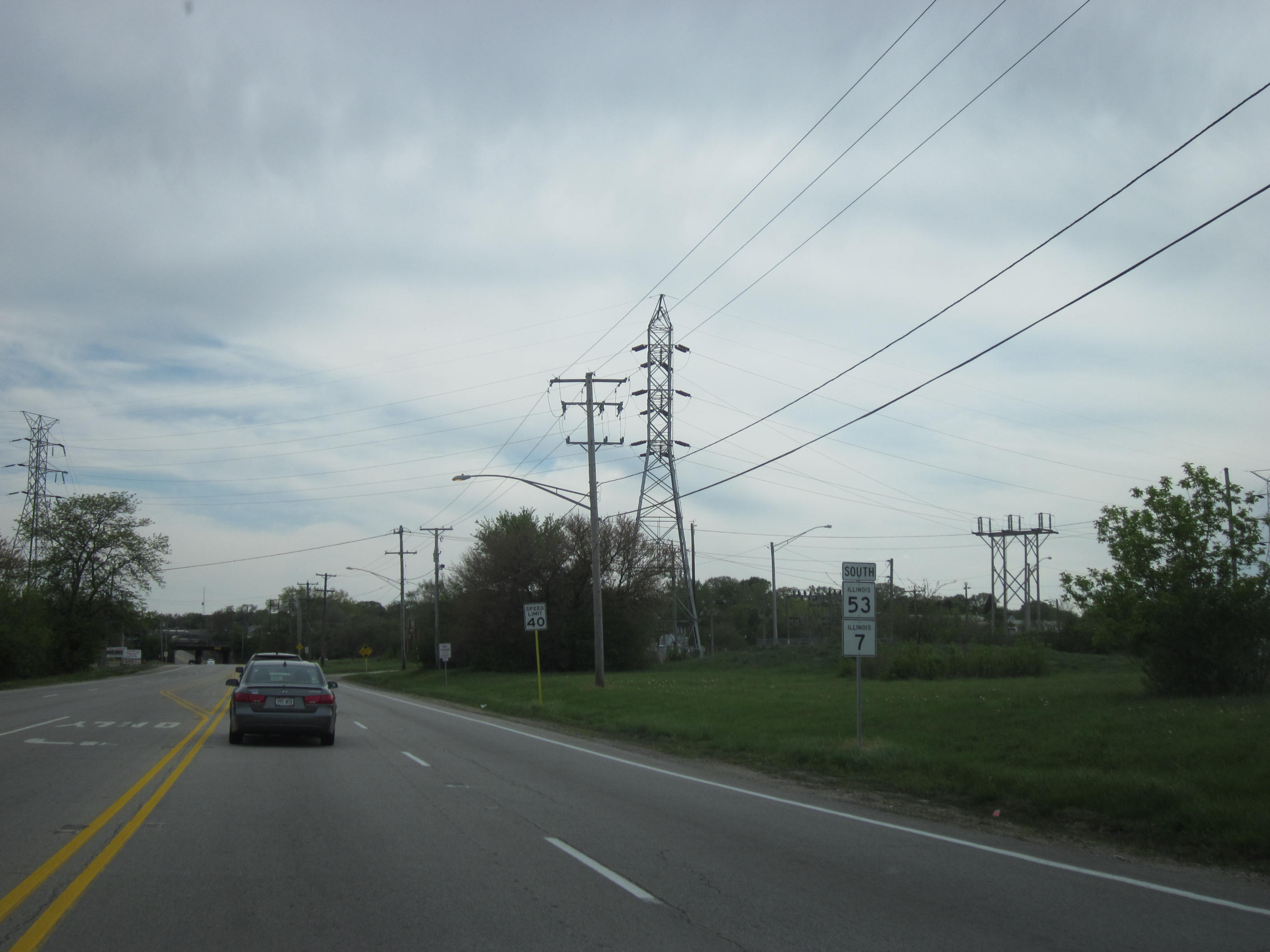
IL 53 and IL 7 southbound

Near Lewis University, IL 7 separates from IL 53. The route passes by Romeoville before interchanging I-55 in Bolingbrook. In Lisle, the route interchanges US 34 before meeting I-88. It then intersects IL 56 and IL 38 before passing under and running parallel with I-355. West of Addison, it intersects US 20 before passing under I-355 again. Then, it runs parallel with I-290 and intersects IL 19. At Biesterfield Road, the highway then runs concurrently with I-290, intersecting IL 72 and passing over IL 58 before reaching the northern terminus of I-290 at I-90. From there, IL 53 remains as a freeway heading north. It interchanges IL 62, US 14, and US 12 in Palatine. The northeast Palatine stretch that goes through the Rand (US 12) and Dundee (IL 68) interchanges is considered to be one of the country's deadliest interchanges in traffic accidents. IL 53 follows Dundee (IL 68) west to Rand (US 12), and then Rand west to North Hicks Road. It then continues north on Hicks until it reaches its northern terminus at IL 83.

== History ==
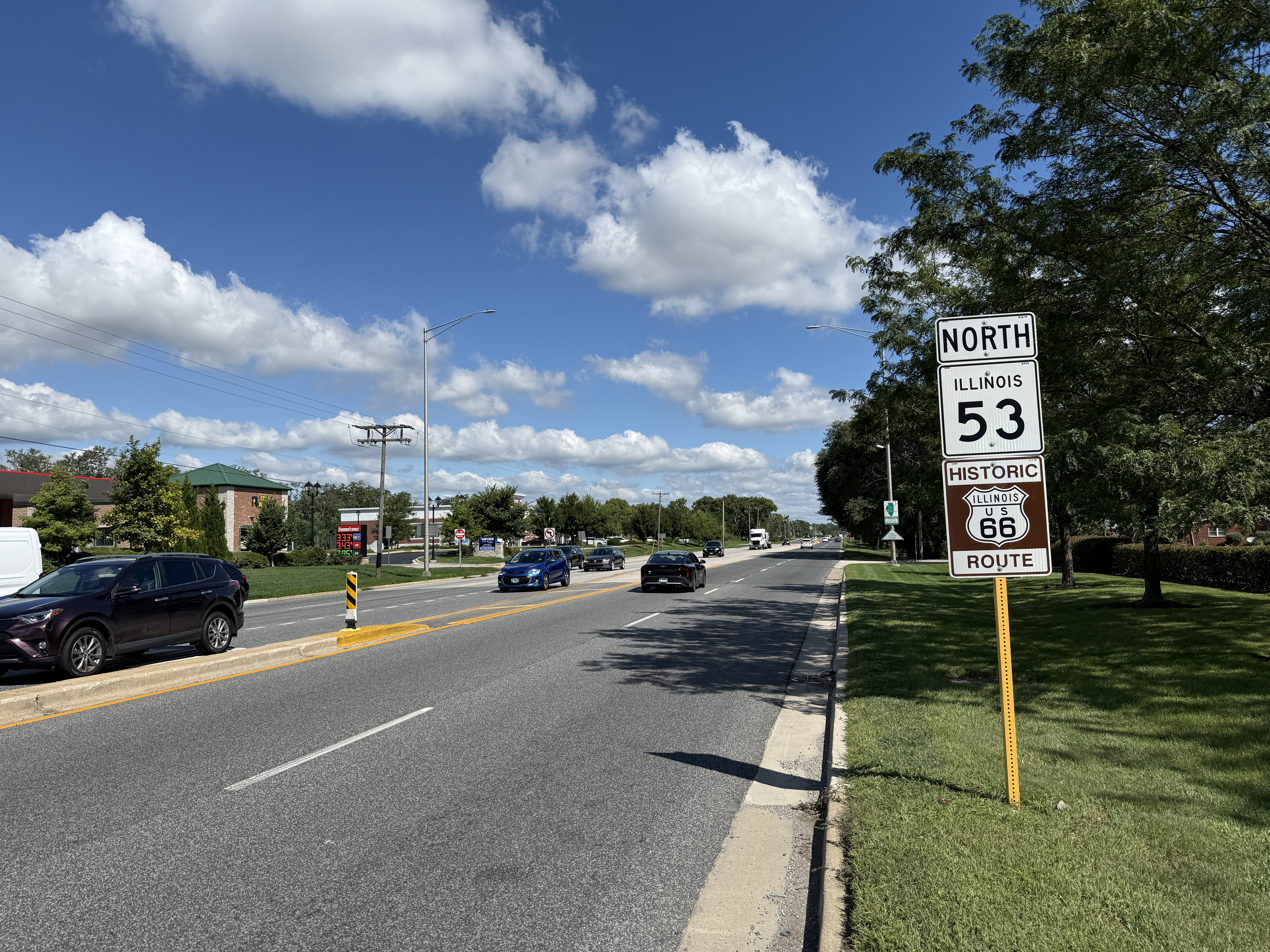
IL 53 northbound in Romeoville

SBI Route 53 ran from Romeoville to Long Grove on Rohlwing Road and Hicks Road from 1924 to 1963. From 1963 through 1970, it was routed onto a new freeway from Addison to Rolling Meadows and cosigned with I-90 until that was changed to I-290.

In 1967 IL 53 was extended to Gardner, and in 1995 IL 129 was routed onto IL 53 south of Braidwood. This lasted a year until IL 129 was dropped entirely south of Braidwood. Near the northern end, the freeway was extended from Dundee Road to Lake–Cook Road in 1989. In 1990, with the construction of I-355, IL 53 was moved off the I-290/I-355 combination south of Biesterfield Road and back onto its original alignment.

For over 40 years, IL 53 had been at the center of a major dispute regarding a northern extension of its freeway segment into Lake County. The studied corridor ran from the current terminus of the freeway at Lake–Cook Road north to a planned bypass for IL 120 near Grayslake, as part of an earlier plan to build a freeway from Chicago to Madison, Wisconsin. The combined IL 53/IL 120 extension would have formed a large T-shape in the center of Lake County, with the IL 120 bypass carrying through traffic from US 12 to the Tri-State Tollway around Gurnee. The extension was opposed by several organizations, notably the Illinois chapter of the Sierra Club, and many residents of Long Grove, which lies in the path of the highway. The Sierra Club opposed the roadway extension because it would have been routed through wetlands and the group had concerns about suburban sprawl and increased pollution. Due to funding constraints with IDOT, the Illinois General Assembly authorized the Illinois Tollway to plan and construct the IL 53 extension in 1993, and was studied on and off for 25 years. In 2019, the latest study was suspended, effectively cancelling the project.

== Major intersections ==
County	Location	mi	km	Destinations	Notes
Grundy	Gardner	0.00	0.00	I-55 – Bloomington, Joliet	Southern terminus; I-55 exit 227; continues west as CR 29
Grundy	Gardner			Historic US 66 east	Southern end of Historic US 66 concurrency
Grundy	Gardner	0.20	0.32	Historic US 66 west	Northern end of Historic US 66 concurrency
Will	Braidwood	8.60	13.84	IL 113 (Main Street)	
Will	Wilmington	13.20	21.24	IL 102 east (Water Street)	Western terminus of IL 102
Will	Joliet	28.30	45.54	US 52 east (Doris Avenue)	Southern end of US 52 concurrency
Will	Joliet	28.70	46.19	I-80 – Moline, Rock Island, Gary Indiana	I-80 exit 132
Will	Joliet	29.10	46.83	US 6 / US 52 west (McDonough Street)	Northern end of US 52 concurrency; southern end of US 6 concurrency
Will	Joliet	29.80	47.96	US 6 / US 30 east (Jefferson Street) / I&M Canal Passage	Eastbound one-way; northern end of US 6 concurrency; southern end of eastbound I&M Canal Passage concurrency
Will	Joliet	30.00	48.28	US 30 west (Cass Street) / I&M Canal Passage	Westbound one-way; southern end of westbound I&M Canal Passage concurrency
Will	Joliet–Crest Hill city line	31.90	51.34	IL 7 south (Theodore Street)	Southern end of IL 7 concurrency
Will	Crest Hill	34.90	56.17	IL 7 north (Renwick Road, 9th Street) / I&M Canal Passage	Northern end of IL 7 / I&M Canal Passage concurrency
Will	Romeoville	40.30	64.86	Historic US 66 east (Joliet Road) to I-55 north – Chicago	Northern end of Historic US 66 concurrency
Will	Bolingbrook	41.50	66.79	I-55 – Chicago, Bloomington	I-55 exit 267
DuPage	Lisle	49.70	79.98	US 34 (Ogden Avenue)	Interchange
DuPage	Lisle	50.30	80.95	I-88 Toll east / IL 110 (CKC) east (Ronald Reagan Memorial Tollway) – Chicago	I-88 exit 130; access from and to I-88 west/IL 110 west via Warrenville Road
DuPage	Glen Ellyn	52.30	84.17	IL 56 (Butterfield Road)	
DuPage	Glen Ellyn	54.30	87.39	IL 38 (Roosevelt Road)	Access via Pershing Avenue and DuPage Boulevard
DuPage	Lombard	58.20	93.66	IL 64 (North Avenue)	
DuPage	Addison	61.40	98.81	US 20 (Lake Street)	
DuPage	Itasca	63.00	101.39	IL 19 (Irving Park Road)	
DuPage	Itasca	64.00	103.00	IL 390 Toll (Elgin O'Hare Tollway) to I-290	I-Pass only; IL 390 exit 12
Cook	Elk Grove Village	65.40	105.25	I-290 east – Chicago	Southern end of I-290 concurrency; south end of freeway; I-290 exit 4
Cook	Schaumburg	68.20	109.76	IL 72 (Higgins Road)	
Cook	Schaumburg	69.20	111.37	IL 58 (Golf Road)	
Cook	Rolling Meadows	69.70	112.17	I-90 Toll (Jane Addams Memorial Tollway) – Chicago, Rockford I-290 ends	Northern end of I-290 concurrency; western terminus of I-290; I-90 exit 68
Cook	Rolling Meadows	70.00	112.65	IL 62 (Algonquin Road)	
Cook	Rolling Meadows	71.40	114.91	Kirchoff Road	Northbound exit and southbound entrance
Cook	Rolling Meadows	71.80	115.55	Euclid Avenue	
Cook	Rolling Meadows–Palatine village line	72.90	117.32	US 14 (Northwest Highway)	
Cook	Palatine–Arlington Heights village line	74.00	119.09	Palatine Road	
Cook	Palatine–Arlington Heights village line	75.30	121.18	US 12 (Rand Road)	Northbound exit and southbound entrance
Cook	Palatine–Arlington Heights village line	76.00	122.31	IL 68 east (Dundee Road)	Southern end of IL 68 concurrency; north end of freeway
Cook	Palatine	77.00	123.92	US 12 east (Rand Road) / IL 68 west (Dundee Road)	Northern end of IL 68 concurrency; southern end of US 12 concurrency
Cook	Palatine	77.60	124.89	US 12 west (Rand Road)	Northern end of US 12 concurrency
Lake	Long Grove	81.82	131.68	IL 83 (McHenry Road)	Northern terminus of IL 53
1.000 mi = 1.609 km; 1.000 km = 0.621 mi: Concurrency terminus; Electronic toll collection; Incomplete access
