= Hamel Township, Madison County, Illinois =

Hamel Township
- Township

- Location of Illinois in the United States
- Coordinates: 38°52′27″N 89°52′11″W
- Country: United States
- State: Illinois
- County: Madison
- Settled: November 2, 1875

Area
  - Total: 36.7 sq mi (95 km^{2})
  - Land: 36.33 sq mi (94.1 km^{2})
  - Water: 0.36 sq mi (0.93 km^{2})
- Elevation: 541 ft (165 m)

Population (2010)
  - Estimate (2016): 2,505
  - Density: 69.5/sq mi (26.8/km^{2})
- Time zone: UTC-6 (CST)
  - Summer (DST): UTC-5 (CDT)
- FIPS code: 17-119-32421

Hamel Township is located in Madison County, Illinois, in the United States. As of the 2010 census, its population was 2,526 and it contained 985 housing units.

== Geography ==
According to the 2010 census, the township has a total area of 36.7 square miles (95 km^{2}), of which 36.33 square miles (94.1 km^{2}) (or 98.99%) is land and 0.36 square miles (0.93 km^{2}) (or 0.98%) is water.

== Demographics ==
Historical population
Census	Pop.	Note	%±
2016 (est.)	2,505
U.S. Decennial Census
