= Diamond, Illinois =

Diamond
- Village
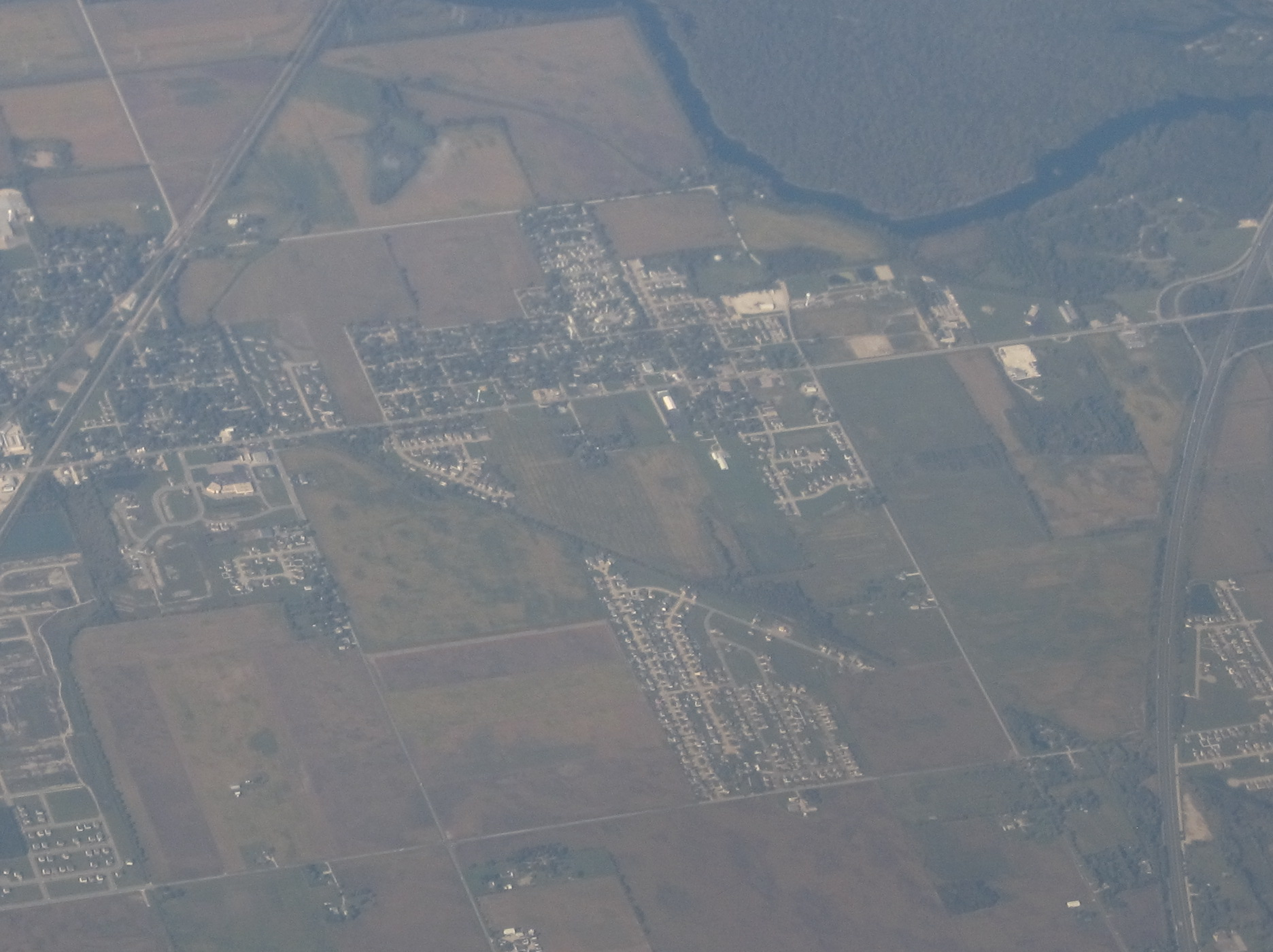
- Aerial view of Diamond, Illinois

- Location of Diamond in Will County, Illinois.
- Coordinates: 41°17′07″N 88°14′52″W
- Country: United States
- State: Illinois
- Counties: Grundy, Will

Area
  - Total: 1.90 sq mi (4.92 km^{2})
  - Land: 1.90 sq mi (4.92 km^{2})
  - Water: 0 sq mi (0.00 km^{2})
- Elevation: 564 ft (172 m)

Population (2020)
  - Total: 2,640
  - Density: 1,389.7/sq mi (536.58/km^{2})
- Time zone: UTC-6 (CST)
  - Summer (DST): UTC-5 (CDT)
- ZIP code: 60416
- Area codes: 815 & 779
- FIPS code: 17-19837
- GNIS feature ID: 2398721
- Website: www.villageofdiamond.org

Diamond is a village in Grundy and Will Counties, Illinois. The population was 2,640 at the 2020 census.

== History ==
A post office called Diamond was established in 1872, and remained in operation until 1909. Black Diamond had its start as a coal town. The village was named for its location in the center of the "Black Diamond" coal district.

On February 16, 1883, the Diamond Mine flooded, killing 72 miners. A monument was erected in Diamond memorializing the event.

On November 17, 2013, an EF-2 tornado hit Diamond.

== Geography ==
According to the 2021 census gazetteer files, Diamond has a total area of 1.90 square miles (4.92 km^{2}), all land.

== Demographics ==
Historical population
Census	Pop.	Note	%±
1880	424		—
1900	672		—
1910	255		−62.1%
1920	85		−66.7%
1930	92		8.2%
1940	80		−13.0%
1950	107		33.8%
1960	250		133.6%
1970	452		80.8%
1980	1,170		158.8%
1990	1,077		−7.9%
2000	1,393		29.3%
2010	2,527		81.4%
2020	2,640		4.5%
U.S. Decennial Census

=== Racial and ethnic composition ===
Diamond village, Illinois – Racial and ethnic composition Note: the US Census treats Hispanic/Latino as an ethnic category. This table excludes Latinos from the racial categories and assigns them to a separate category. Hispanics/Latinos may be of any race.
Race / Ethnicity (NH = Non-Hispanic)	Pop 2000	Pop 2010	Pop 2020	% 2000	% 2010	% 2020
White alone (NH)	1,320	2,328	2,276	94.76%	92.13%	86.21%
Black or African American alone (NH)	0	20	24	0.00%	0.79%	0.91%
Native American or Alaska Native alone (NH)	9	5	5	0.65%	0.20%	0.19%
Asian alone (NH)	1	5	14	0.07%	0.20%	0.53%
Native Hawaiian or Pacific Islander alone (NH)	0	1	3	0.00%	0.04%	0.11%
Other race alone (NH)	0	0	7	0.00%	0.00%	0.27%
Mixed race or Multiracial (NH)	14	34	135	1.01%	1.35%	5.11%
Hispanic or Latino (any race)	49	134	176	3.52%	5.30%	6.67%
Total	1,393	2,527	2,640	100.00%	100.00%	100.00%

=== 2020 census ===
As of the 2020 census, Diamond had a population of 2,640. The median age was 36.1 years. 27.8% of residents were under the age of 18 and 13.0% of residents were 65 years of age or older. For every 100 females, there were 103.5 males, and for every 100 females age 18 and over, there were 99.9 males. The population density was 1,389.47 inhabitants per square mile (536.48/km^{2}). There were 1,043 housing units at an average density of 548.95 per square mile (211.95/km^{2}).

99.8% of residents lived in urban areas, while 0.2% lived in rural areas.

There were 1,006 households in Diamond, of which 39.3% had children under the age of 18 living in them. Of all households, 48.9% were married-couple households, 19.2% were households with a male householder and no spouse or partner present, and 23.5% were households with a female householder and no spouse or partner present. About 26.3% of all households were made up of individuals, and 12.2% had someone living alone who was 65 years of age or older.

There were 1,043 housing units, of which 3.5% were vacant. The homeowner vacancy rate was 1.1% and the rental vacancy rate was 7.7%.

=== Income and poverty ===
The median income for a household in the village was $51,019, and the median income for a family was $73,750. Males had a median income of $53,148 versus $29,327 for females. The per capita income for the village was $30,891. About 11.9% of families and 11.0% of the population were below the poverty line, including 20.1% of those under age 18 and 9.2% of those age 65 or over.

== Education ==
All of Diamond in Grundy County is in the Coal City Community Unit School District 1.

Most of Diamond in Will County is in the Reed Custer Community Unit School District 255U, while a piece is in the Wilmington Community Unit School District 209U, and another piece is in the Coal City district.
