= Crest Hill, Illinois =

City in the United States

- City
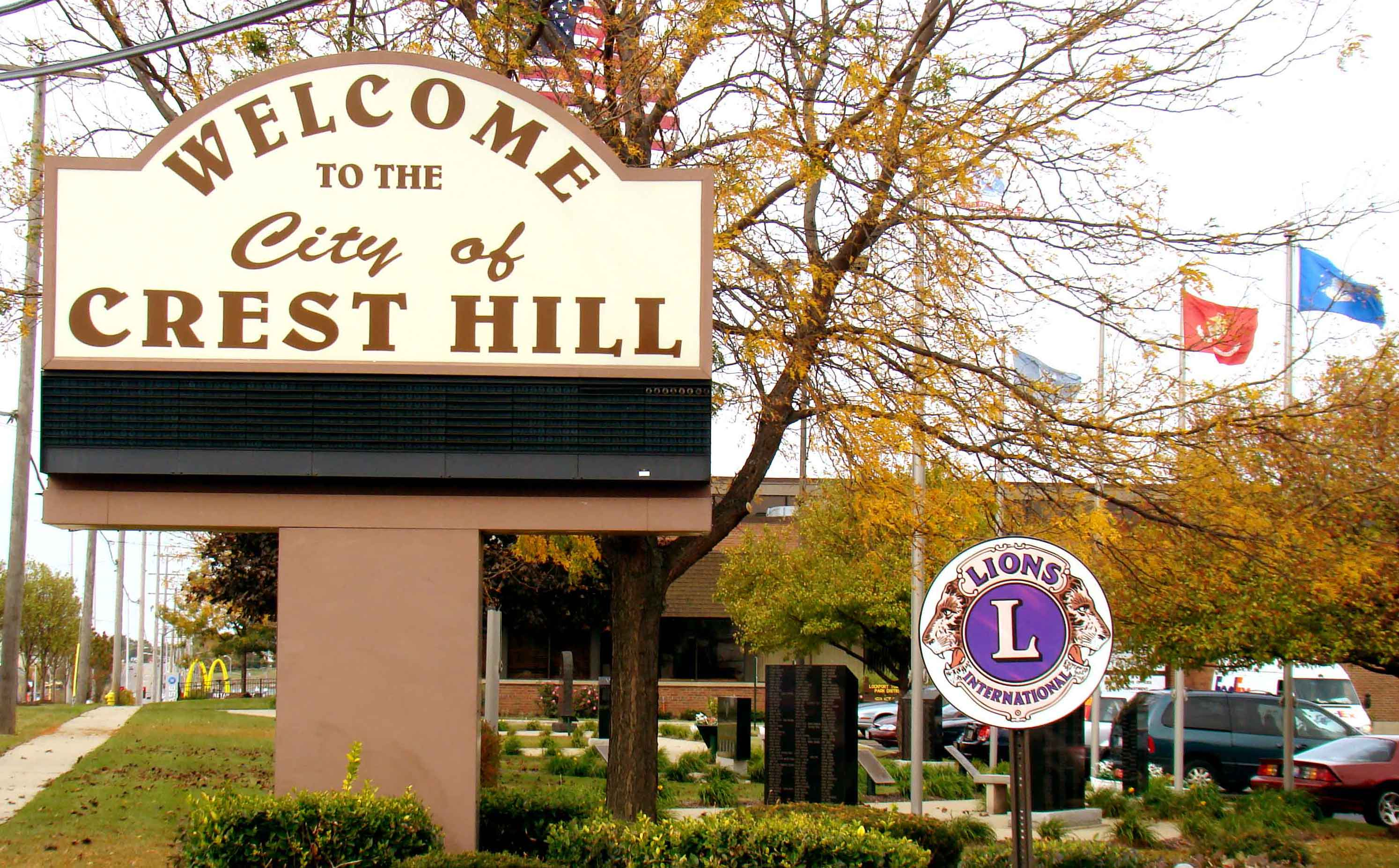
- City Hall in 2011
- Motto: City of neighbors
- Interactive map of Crest Hill, Illinois
- Location within Chicago metropolitan area Location within Illinois Location within the United States
- Coordinates: 41°33′56″N 88°07′20″W
- Country: United States
- State: Illinois
- County: Will
- Township: Lockport
- Incorporated: January 22, 1960

Government
  - Type: Mayor and City Council

Area
  - Total: 9.19 sq mi (23.79 km^{2})
  - Land: 9.04 sq mi (23.42 km^{2})
  - Water: 0.14 sq mi (0.37 km^{2})
- Elevation: 640 ft (200 m)

Population (2020)
  - Total: 20,459
  - Density: 2,262.8/sq mi (873.68/km^{2})
- Time zone: UTC-6 (CST)
  - Summer (DST): UTC-5 (CDT)
- ZIP codes: 60403, 60489
- Area code: 815
- FIPS code: 17-17458
- GNIS feature ID: 2393670
- Website: Official website

Crest Hill is a city in Will County, Illinois, United States. The population was 20,459 at the 2020 census. The east side of the city is situated along Historic U.S. Route 66 (now IL-53). An outer suburb of Chicago, Crest Hill serves as a bedroom community to the larger city of Joliet. It is home to Stateville Correctional Center, as well as numerous bars, restaurants and tourist attractions related to Route 66.

== History ==
The neighborhood of Stern Park Gardens, later incorporated into Crest Hill, renamed itself Lidice in 1942, following the Lidice massacre. Former presidential candidate Wendell Willkie and Czechoslovak president-in-exile Edvard Beneš spoke at the dedication, commemorating the tragedy.

== Geography ==
Crest Hill decided to incorporate itself to avoid being annexed by the City of Joliet and became officially incorporated as the City of Crest Hill January 22, 1960.

According to the 2010 census, Crest Hill has a total area of 9.166 square miles (23.74 km^{2}), of which 9.03 square miles (23.39 km^{2}) (or 98.52%) is land and 0.136 square miles (0.35 km^{2}) (or 1.48%) is water.

== Demographics ==
Historical population
Census	Pop.	Note	%±
1960	5,887		—
1970	7,460		26.7%
1980	9,252		24.0%
1990	10,643		15.0%
2000	13,329		25.2%
2010	20,837		56.3%
2020	20,459		−1.8%
U.S. Decennial Census

=== Racial and ethnic composition ===
Crest Hill city, Illinois – Racial and ethnic composition Note: the US Census treats Hispanic/Latino as an ethnic category. This table excludes Latinos from the racial categories and assigns them to a separate category. Hispanics/Latinos may be of any race.
Race / Ethnicity (NH = Non-Hispanic)	Pop 2000	Pop 2010	Pop 2020	% 2000	% 2010	% 2020
White alone (NH)	9,246	11,800	9,911	69.37%	56.63%	48.44%
Black or African American alone (NH)	2,591	4,494	4,460	19.44%	21.57%	21.80%
Native American or Alaska Native alone (NH)	19	30	20	0.14%	0.14%	0.10%
Asian alone (NH)	150	496	513	1.13%	2.38%	2.51%
Native Hawaiian or Pacific Islander alone (NH)	10	4	1	0.08%	0.02%	0.00%
Other race alone (NH)	11	18	49	0.08%	0.09%	0.24%
Mixed race or Multiracial (NH)	128	263	633	0.96%	1.26%	3.09%
Hispanic or Latino (any race)	1,174	3,732	4,872	8.81%	17.91%	23.81%
Total	13,329	20,837	20,459	100.00%	100.00%	100.00%

=== 2020 census ===
As of the 2020 census, Crest Hill had a population of 20,459. The median age was 40.0 years. 17.9% of residents were under the age of 18 and 17.6% of residents were 65 years of age or older. For every 100 females there were 119.3 males, and for every 100 females age 18 and over there were 123.7 males age 18 and over.

99.8% of residents lived in urban areas, while 0.2% lived in rural areas.

There were 7,442 households in Crest Hill, of which 27.8% had children under the age of 18 living in them. Of all households, 40.7% were married-couple households, 19.5% were households with a male householder and no spouse or partner present, and 32.7% were households with a female householder and no spouse or partner present. About 32.8% of all households were made up of individuals and 16.1% had someone living alone who was 65 years of age or older.

There were 7,842 housing units, of which 5.1% were vacant. The homeowner vacancy rate was 1.3% and the rental vacancy rate was 6.7%.

Racial composition as of the 2020 census
Race	Number	Percent
White	10,796	52.8%
Black or African American	4,532	22.2%
American Indian and Alaska Native	135	0.7%
Asian	529	2.6%
Native Hawaiian and Other Pacific Islander	1	0.0%
Some other race	2,290	11.2%
Two or more races	2,176	10.6%

=== 2010 census ===
A significant portion of the population resides at Stateville Correctional Center (see below). The 2010 U.S. Census Bureau data states that 3,160 residents of Crest Hill (15.2% of the population) are institutionalized.

=== 2000 census ===
At the 2000 census, there were 13,329 people, 4,478 households and 2,758 families residing in the city. The population density was 1,861.2 inhabitants per square mile (718.6/km^{2}). There were 4,808 housing units at an average density of 671.4 per square mile (259.2/km^{2}). The racial makeup of the city was 69.4% (White Non-Hispanic) 19.6% (African American), 8.8% (Hispanic), 3.2% (Other), 1.4% (Two or more races), .5% (American Indian). Total can be more than 100% because Hispanics could be counted in other races.

There were 4,478 households, of which 30.2% had children under the age of 18 living with them, 45.1% were married couples living together, 12.0% had a female householder with no husband present, and 38.4% were non-families. 30.9% of all households were made up of individuals, and 7.9% had someone living alone who was 65 years of age or older. The average household size was 2.37 and the average family size was 3.00.

18.9% of the population were under the age of 18, 13.6% from 18 to 24, 41.2% from 25 to 44, 17.1% from 45 to 64, and 9.2% who were 65 years of age or older. The median age was 32 years. For every 100 females, there were 147.7 males. For every 100 females age 18 and over, there were 157.8 males.

The median household income was $45,313 and the median family income was $54,709. Males had a median income of $41,715 compared with $27,667 for females. The per capita income for the city was $22,317. About 2.6% of families and 4.8% of the population were below the poverty line, including 4.8% of those under age 18 and 5.8% of those age 65 or over.

== Government and infrastructure ==
The Stateville Correctional Center of the Illinois Department of Corrections, opened in what was then an unincorporated area of Will County in 1925, is located in Crest Hill. John Wayne Gacy was executed by lethal injection at the Stateville Correctional Center in 1994.

== Education ==
Elementary school districts include:

- Chaney-Monge School District 88
- Richland School District 88A

Private schools include:

- Joliet Montessori School

Most of Crest Hill is zoned to Lockport Township High School.

== Transportation ==
Pace provides bus service on Routes 505, 507 and 832 connecting Crest Hill to downtown Joliet and other destinations. Crest Hill is served by the Elgin Joliet & Eastern Railway Main Line currently operated by the Canadian National.

== Notable person ==
- Ron Coomer, Major League Baseball player and broadcaster, born in Crest Hill
