= Sprague's Super Service =

- U.S. National Register of Historic Places
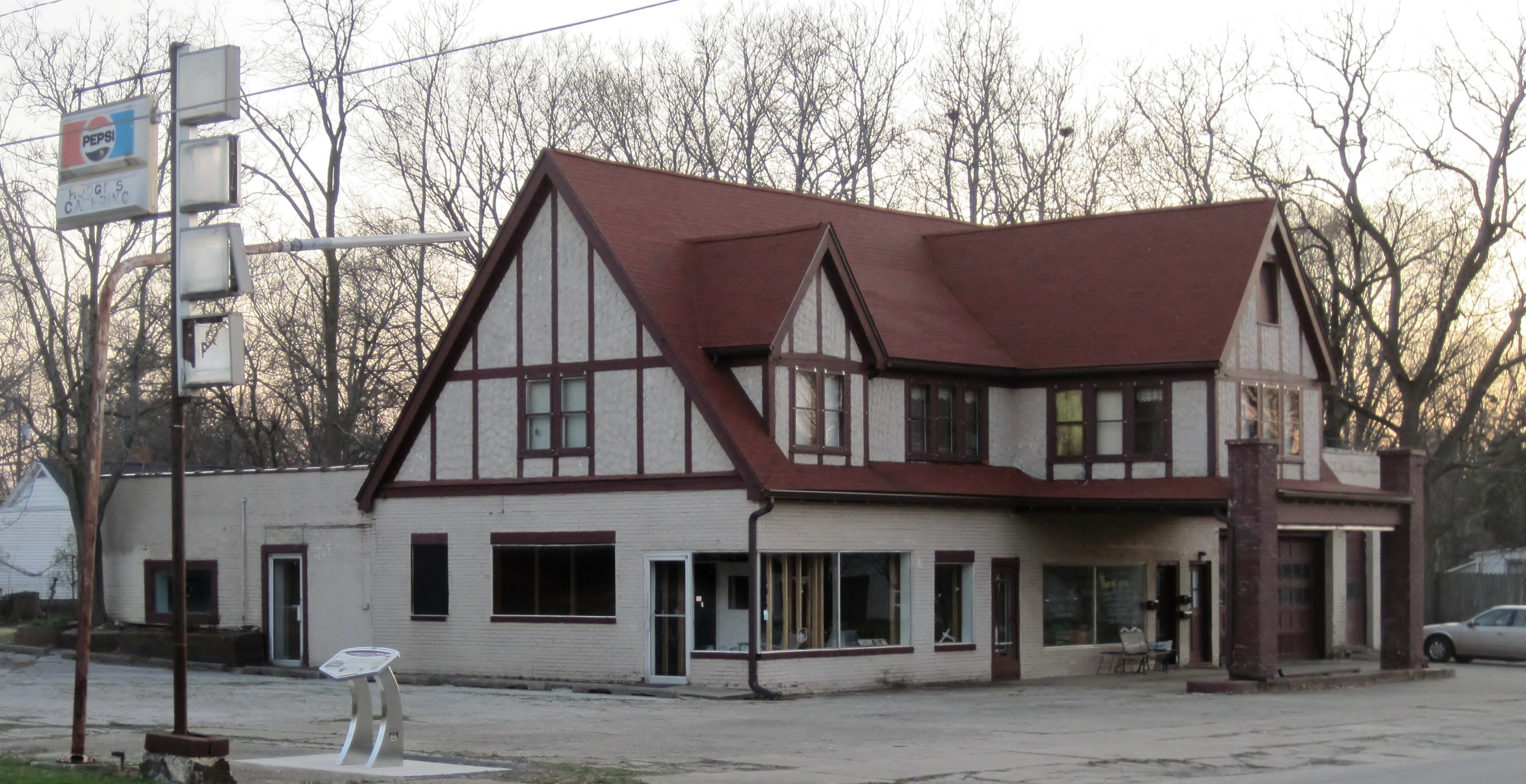
- Sprague's Super Service

- Location within Illinois
- Location: 305 E. Pine St. Normal, McLean County, Illinois, USA
- Nearest city: Normal, Illinois
- Coordinates: 40°31′3″N 88°58′51″W
- Built: 1931
- Architectural style: Tudor Revival
- Restored: 2006
- Restored by: Terri Ryburn
- MPS: Historic and Architectural Resources of Route 66 Through Illinois
- NRHP reference No.: 08000327
- Added to NRHP: 2008-04-25

Sprague's Super Service is a historic independent gas station on Route 66 in Normal, Illinois. It is listed on the National Register of Historic Places, Town of Normal Local Landmark, and is in the Route 66 Association of Illinois Hall of Fame.

== Architecture ==
A Tudor Revival building constructed in 1931 by William Sprague to house a service station, restaurant and garage, it is the largest of three remaining two-story fuel station buildings on US 66, originally housing a café and service station on the main floor plus two second-floor apartments for the owner and the station attendant.

As Pine Street (the main U.S. 66 route before construction of the Veterans Parkway as a bypass after 1940) is part of a largely residential neighbourhood, the station was designed to fit with its surroundings by having the building follows the architectural conventions of a private residence.

== History ==
General contractor William Sprague opened Sprague's Super Service in 1931.

While additions were made to the station in 1948 and 1967 (one of which sited a second auto service bay as an adjoining garage beside the main building) the original building's design has been left largely intact. Originally a Cities Service vendor, the station has sold various brands of fuel (including Gulf Oil during the 1960s). The last fuel was dispensed in 1971 and the pumps removed by 1979. The building then served as a storefront for various businesses including Joe's Welding and Boiler Company, Corn Belt Manufacturing, Yellow Cab and Avis Rent-a-Car. The last occupants were Hodge's Catering and Bridal World before the building was ultimately left vacant.

== Restoration effort ==
Illinois State University instructor and Route 66 historical author Terri Ryburn, with her husband William Sanders (August 23, 1933 - January 6, 2011), purchased the station at a cost of $220,000 to begin restoration in October 2006. An architectural study was completed and the roof, electric and plumbing systems, bathrooms, ceilings and heating and air conditioning system replaced as the first steps in an eventual restoration of the property. The owner's stated intention was to reopen the historic building as an information centre, café, diner, soda fountain, bed and breakfast and event space; these plans were delayed due to an estimated total cost of $1.2 million to fully complete this ambitious project.

Sprague's Super Service has been listed on the National Register of Historic Places since April 25, 2008, was inducted into the Route 66 Association of Illinois Hall of Fame in 2009 and designated municipally as a local historic landmark on August 15, 2011.

In December 2010, an outdoor wayside exhibit was installed to describe the history of the Sprague Service Station in all the various incarnations it has gone through over the years as a service station, a residence and various retail operations. In 2012, a group of Illinois State University interior design students proposed various designs for interior renovations.

Various attempts have been made to raise funds to complete the restoration; in addition to about $90,000 from the owner's own pockets, contributions have included a $46,695 grant from the town for a new roof and temporary furnace, a $20,000 matching grant from the National Park Service for a heating and air conditioning system, duct work and ceiling, a $10,000 matching grant from the National Park Service to replace windows in the living quarters above the station, a $10,000 grant from the state for two new bathrooms and a day of volunteer service from the Route 66 Association. An additional $10,000 federal matching grant in 2012 subsidized restoration of historic wood-frame windows and doors.

In 2010, proceeds from the sale of a 'Pics on Route 66′ 2011 Calendar by David Schwartz were donated to the restoration effort; local classic country group Wagon Load A Trouble performed for free at the site in 2014. Attempts have also been made to raise funds through private individual donation.

As of 2014, Ryburn planned to include a coffee and ice cream shop, a tea room and theatre space but said, "The short-term goal now is to finish the downstairs and rent that out as event space, so I can get some income to finish my plans. I can't afford the equipment for a restaurant now."

In 2016, Ryburn sold the station to the town of Normal, Illinois. After additional renovations, the station reopened in August 12, 2017. It operates as a visitor center and gift shop featuring local art under the name Ryburn Place.

== See also ==
- Ambler's Texaco Gas Station and Soulsby Service Station on U.S. Route 66 in Illinois
- Provine Service Station on U.S. Route 66 in Oklahoma
- National Register of Historic Places listings in McLean County, Illinois
