= Historic and Architectural Resources of Route 66 Through Illinois =

- Route 66 Through Illinois Multiple Property Submission
- U.S. National Register of Historic Places
- Location: Illinois, United States
- NRHP reference No.: 64500208
- Added to NRHP: May 5, 2006

U.S. Route 66 (US 66, Route 66) was a highway established on November 11, 1926, connecting Chicago to Santa Monica. Several buildings from the Route 66 era still stand and are part of the Historic and Architectural Resources of Route 66 Through Illinois Multiple Property Submission on the National Register of Historic Places.

== List ==
Resource Name	Image	Address	City	Added
Ambler's Texaco Gas Station		Illinois Route 17 and Old U.S. 66; 41°5′39″N 88°26′26″W	Dwight	November 29, 2001
Ariston Café		314 Old Route 66; 39°10′38″N 89°40′5″W	Litchfield	May 5, 2006
Alternate Route 66, Wilmington to Joliet		Illinois Route 53 between Wilmington and Joliet; 41°24′16″N 88°6′27″W	Joliet and Wilmington	May 5, 2006
Belvidere Café, Motel, and Gas Station		817 Old Route 66; 39°10′16″N 89°40′3″W	Litchfield	February 21, 2007
Chain of Rocks Bridge		West Chain of Rocks Rd. 38°45′41″N 90°10′26″W	Madison	December 1, 2006
Dell Rhea's Chicken Basket		645 Joliet Road; 41°44′51″N 87°56′22″W	Willowbrook	May 5, 2006
Lou Mitchell's Restaurant		565 W. Jackson Blvd. 41°52′38″N 87°38′30″W	Chicago	May 5, 2006
Route 66 by Carpenter Park		Old Route 66 between Cabin Smoke Trail and north bank of the Sangamon River; 39°52′21″N 89°36′51″W	Springfield and Sherman	May 9, 2002
Route 66, Cayuga to Chenoa		Route 66, between just N. of Township Rd 2200 N. and just S. of Township Rd 3000 N. 40°45′12″N 88°43′7″W	Pontiac	July 23, 2003
Route 66, Girard to Nilwood		Route 66, between Illinois Route 4 (IL 4) south of Girard and IL 4 in Nilwood; 39°24′45″N 89°47′16″W	Nilwood	May 23, 2002
Route 66, Litchfield to Mount Olive		Route 66, N of Illinois Route 16 in Litchfield to Mount Olive; 39°7′48″N 89°41′34″W	Litchfield	November 29, 2001
Route 66 South of Lake Springfield		Olde Rt. 66/Olde Carriage Way; 39°40′30.9″N 89°37′28.92″W	Springfield	May 12, 2009
Sprague's Super Service		305 E. Pine St. 40°31′3″N 88°58′51″W	Normal	April 25, 2008
Standard Oil Gasoline Station		400 S. West St. 41°0′7″N 88°31′44″W	Odell	November 9, 1997
Soulsby Service Station		102 S. Route 66 St. 39°4′23″N 89°44′8″W	Mount Olive	May 6, 2004
