= Lou Mitchell's =

- Lou Mitchell's Restaurant
- U.S. National Register of Historic Places
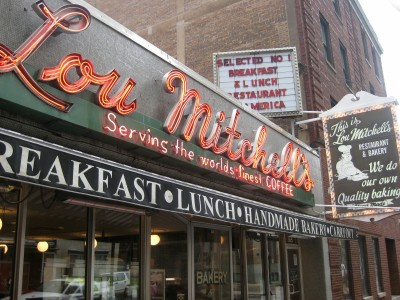
- Sign above Lou Mitchells

- Location within Chicago metropolitan area Location within Illinois Location within the United States
- Location: 565 W. Jackson Blvd., Chicago, Illinois
- Coordinates: 41°52′38″N 87°38′30″W
- Built: 1949
- MPS: Route 66 through Illinois MPS
- NRHP reference No.: 06000376
- Added to NRHP: May 5, 2006

Lou Mitchell's, also known as Lou Mitchell's Restaurant, is a Chicago diner located at 565 W. Jackson Boulevard. It is a popular restaurant for commuters, as it is located near Union Station. It is also located near the start of U.S. Route 66 (US 66) and was frequented by many people at the start of their journey along the road, earning it the nickname "the first stop on the Mother Road." In May 2002, the Nationwide Route 66 restoration program was launched at Lou Mitchell's. It was listed on the National Register of Historic Places in 2006.

Lou Mitchell's has been owned by Heleen Thanasouras. She appeared as the guest judge for the Quickfire Challenge of Episode 11 of Top Chef (season 4), which involved working at "the hull", or egg station, at the restaurant for twenty minutes.

In November 2015, Heleen died at age 63.
