= Dell Rhea's Chicken Basket =

Restaurant in Willowbrook, Illinois, US

- U.S. National Register of Historic Places
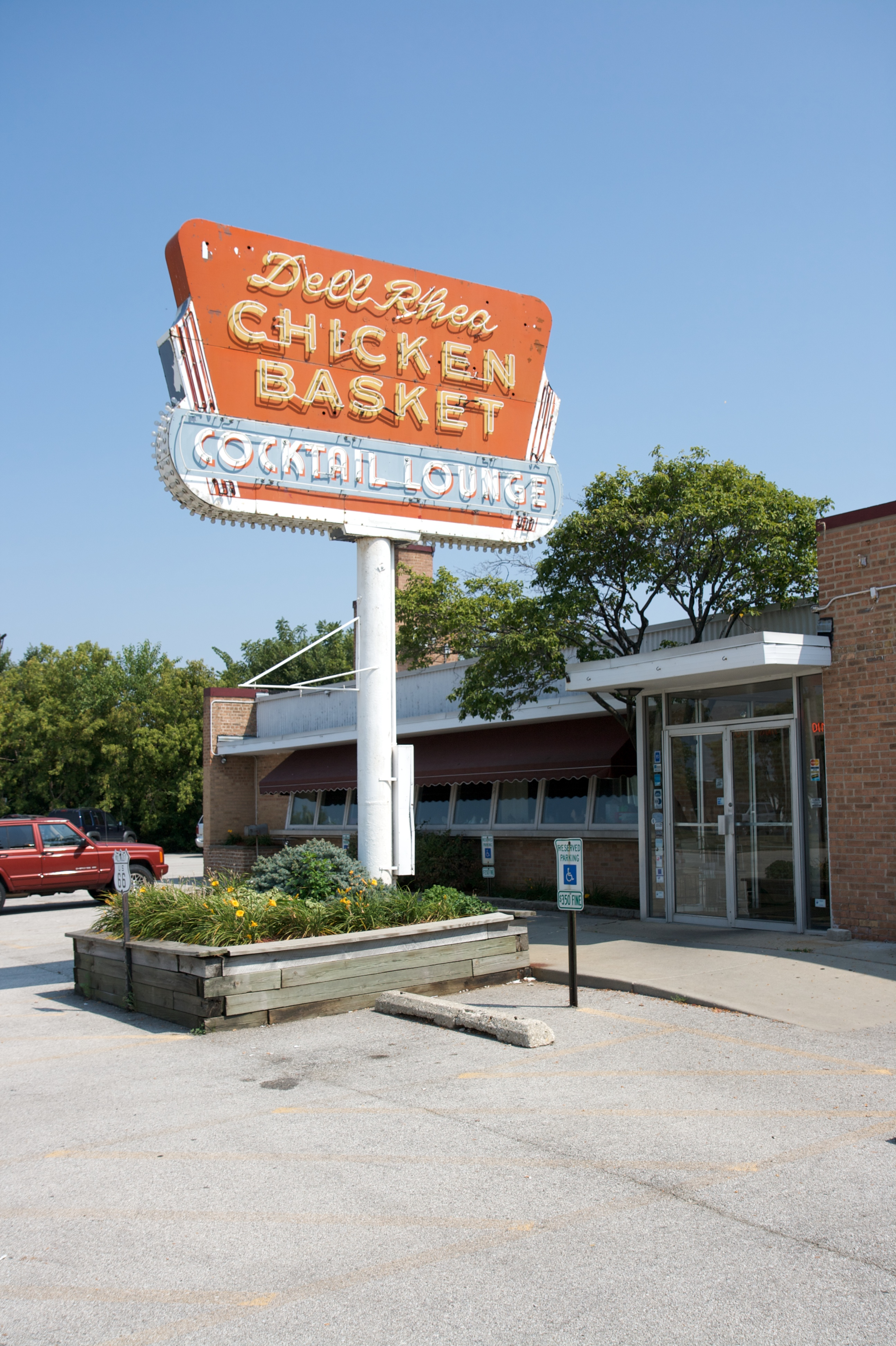

- Location within Illinois Location within the United States
- Location: 645 Joliet Road; Willowbrook, DuPage County, Illinois, U.S.
- Coordinates: 41°44′51″N 87°56′22″W
- Built: 1946; 80 years ago
- Architect: Eugene F. Stoyke
- Architectural style: No particular style
- MPS: Route 66 through Illinois MPS
- NRHP reference No.: 06000375
- Added to NRHP: May 5, 2006

Dell Rhea's Chicken Basket is a restaurant in Willowbrook, DuPage County, Illinois. It is located along historical U.S. Route 66, near present-day Interstate 55.

== History ==
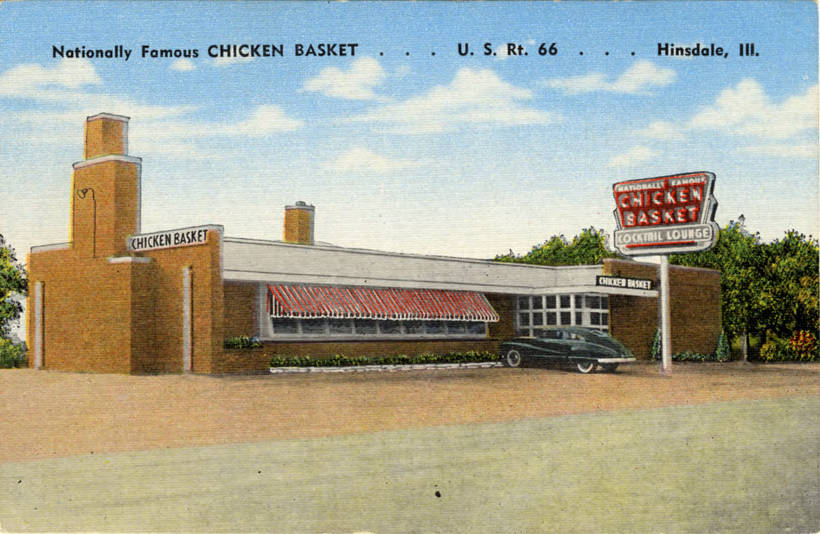
Chicken Basket (postcard)

The Chicken Basket began as a simple lunch counter selling sandwiches in a gas station along Route 66, operated by Ervin 'Irv' Kolarik, that was opened sometime during the late 1920s. In 1938, two local farm women entered Irv Kolarik's gas station for a cup of coffee; they overheard him complaining about how he hated running a gas station and preferred running the lunch counter instead and offered to share their secret recipe for fried chicken with him if he agreed to buy his chickens from them. In fact, they even agreed to go to work for him and make the chicken. Kolarik consented, and the chicken was an instant success. The lunch counter was no longer sufficient for serving customers. Kolarik initially converted the station's by then disused automobile repair garage bays into dining rooms, which eventually became known as the National Chicken Basket; but by the mid-1940s, further demand made it clear that a new building was needed to serve patrons. This prompted Kolarik to buy the adjacent property and build a full-service restaurant. Kolarik hired Chicago architect Eugene F. Stoyke to construct the one-story brick restaurant and cocktail lounge.

The present-day Chicken Basket was opened next door from the gas station in 1946 in what was then Hinsdale, Illinois, now Willowbrook. The roadhouse's proximity to Chicago fostered its continued success, and it became a bus stop on Joliet Road for the west suburban Bluebird Coach Lines in 1936, the year that Bluebird acquired the bus route from the Chicago & Joliet Transportation Co., which had introduced service on Route 66 in 1928 (this bus route was later acquired by West Suburban Transit Lines, which went out of business in 1976). Becoming an official Bluebird bus stop helped increase business for the Chicken Basket, as did the fact that patrons of the restaurant could sit by the front windows and watch airplanes taking off and landing at what was then Hinsdale Airport across the street on Joliet Road.

Kolarik was also a minor genius at getting publicity for the restaurant. For example, during the winters, Kolarik would flood the roof of the restaurant and hire local youths to ice skate on top of it. A cocktail lounge wing was added in 1956; that was the building's last major alteration. However, in the end, Kolarik's creative marketing ideas weren't enough to overcome other obstacles. The Interstate Highway System in the 1950s forced roads such as Route 66 to reroute onto superhighways, and the restaurant was eventually bypassed by the construction and opening of I-55 during the late 1950s to early 1960s, which cut off its access to major traffic on this important highway.

== Change of ownership ==
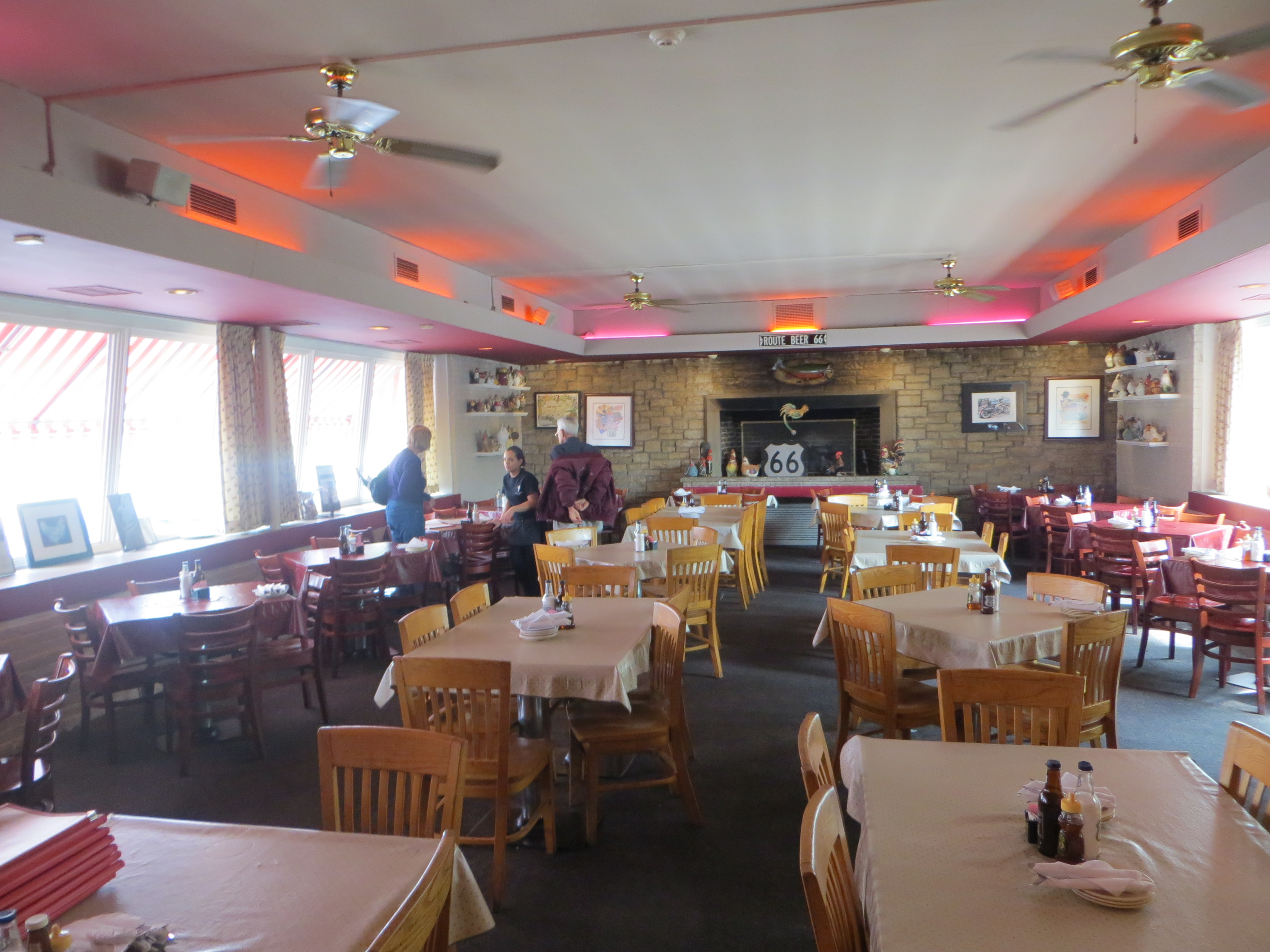
Interior of the restaurant

Kolarik kept the restaurant open for many years; then when he discovered that construction of I-55 would cut the restaurant off from major highway traffic, he briefly sold it to another operator before buying it back. However, as more traffic moved to the interstate, business dwindled and the restaurant was taken over by a local bank, which kept it in operation until another buyer could be found. Delbert 'Dell' Rhea, a prominent Chicago businessman who had managed the then Stevens Hotel and had been the executive director of the Chicago Convention and Tourism Bureau, at the time owned the Woodbine Inn down the street from the Chicken Basket. Rhea sold the Woodbine Inn and purchased the historic roadhouse in 1963, taking over Kolarik's former business and keeping the Chicken Basket's menu and name but adding his own name as well. Rhea's son Patrick, who grew up working in the restaurant along with his mother, Grace Rhea, assumed control of Dell Rhea's Chicken Basket following Dell's death in 1992. The Lombardi family bought the restaurant in 2019 with the promise to continue the tradition by keeping intact the original recipe, service, and homestyle environment that makes the Chicken Basket.

The building and its classic freestanding neon sign were added to the National Register of Historic Places on May 5, 2006, along with fellow Illinois Route 66 restaurants Lou Mitchell's and Ariston Cafe. In 2009, the restaurant was featured on a Route 66 edition of Diners, Drive-Ins and Dives.

== See also ==
- List of chicken restaurants
