= Belvidere Café, Motel, and Gas Station =

- Belvidere Café, Motel and Gas Station
- U.S. National Register of Historic Places
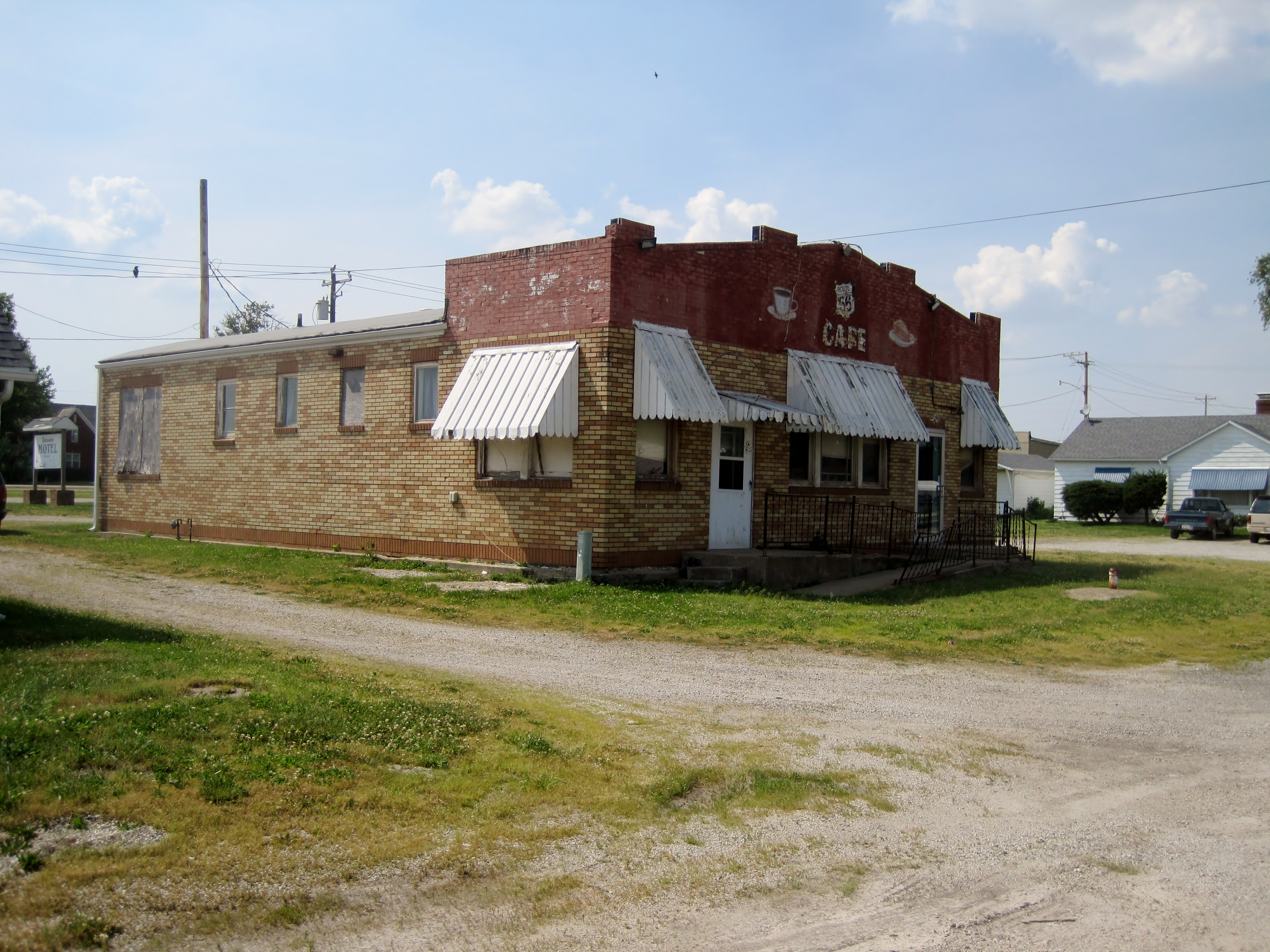
- Route 66 Café

- Location within Illinois Location within the United States
- Location: 817 Old Rte 66, Litchfield, Montgomery County, Illinois, United States
- Coordinates: 39°10′09″N 89°40′02″W
- Built: 1936
- Architectural style: Tudor Revival
- MPS: Route 66 through Illinois MPS
- NRHP reference No.: 07000060
- Added to NRHP: February 21, 2007

Belvidere Café, Motel and Gas Station is a historic building in Litchfield, Illinois, United States, along Route 66. The site also has a residence and two motel units.

== History ==
In 1929, Albina and Vincenzo Cerolla built a one-room, frame gas station with a single pump to serve motorists on Route 66. The station also sold motor oil and other automobile accessories and necessities. The station operated under a lease as part of the Johnson Oil Refining Company of Chicago. In 1936, they expanded with a new brick gas station, a café, four motel rooms with individual automobile garages, and a small house for the owners. The restaurant was known as Cerolla's Café.

Edith, the daughter of the Cerollas, and her husband Lester "Curly" Kranich continued the business after the death of Edith's parents. The Kraniches demolished the original house on the property in the 1950s and built a new one with a garage. They also expanded the motel at this time, adding two identical wings. The Kraniches also had to reorient the entrances when a new four-lane bypass opened on the other side of the property in the 1940s.

The construction of Interstate 55 in the 1970s marked the end of the once-thriving family business by diverting highway traffic westward. The café closed in 1971. The Kraniches retired in 1975, closing the facility. The café, motel, and gas station buildings were kept in relatively good condition but were used primarily for storage. The property sits largely vacant; the buildings are for sale. The current owner occasionally rents a room in one of the wings.

== See also ==
- List of motels
