= Willowbrook, DuPage County, Illinois =

Village in the United States

Willowbrook
- Village
- Village of Willowbrook
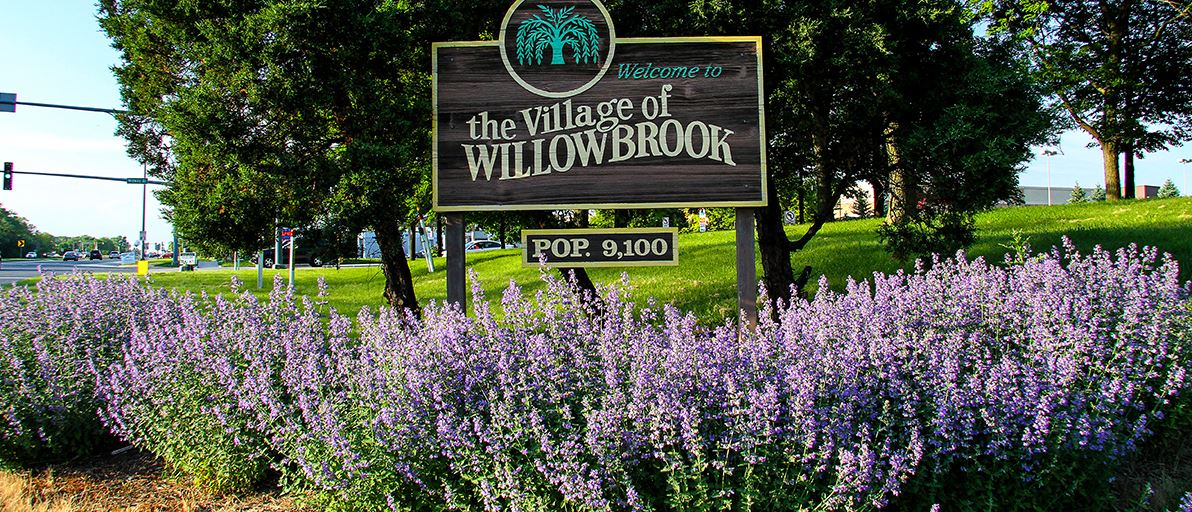
- Willowbrook, Illinois' Welcome Sign on IL-83

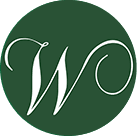
- Seal

- Location of Willowbrook in DuPage County, Illinois.
- Coordinates: 41°45′32″N 87°56′57″W
- Country: United States
- State: Illinois
- County: DuPage
- Township: Downers Grove
- Incorporated: 1960

Government
  - Type: Mayor-council government

Area
  - Total: 2.63 sq mi (6.80 km^{2})
  - Land: 2.57 sq mi (6.66 km^{2})
  - Water: 0.054 sq mi (0.14 km^{2}) 2.18%
- Elevation: 732 ft (223 m)

Population (2020)
  - Total: 9,236
  - Density: 3,591.1/sq mi (1,386.54/km^{2})

Standard of living
  - Per capita income: $37,715 (median: $56,725)
  - Home value: $216,000 (median: $245,800 (2000))
- Time zone: UTC-6 (CST)
  - Summer (DST): UTC-5 (CDT)
- ZIP code: 60527
- Area code(s): 630 and 331
- FIPS code: 17-81919
- GNIS feature ID: 2399702
- Website: www.willowbrookil.org

Willowbrook is a village in DuPage County, Illinois, United States, in the Chicago metropolitan area. Per the 2020 census, the population was 9,236. It is a southwestern suburb of Chicago.

== History ==
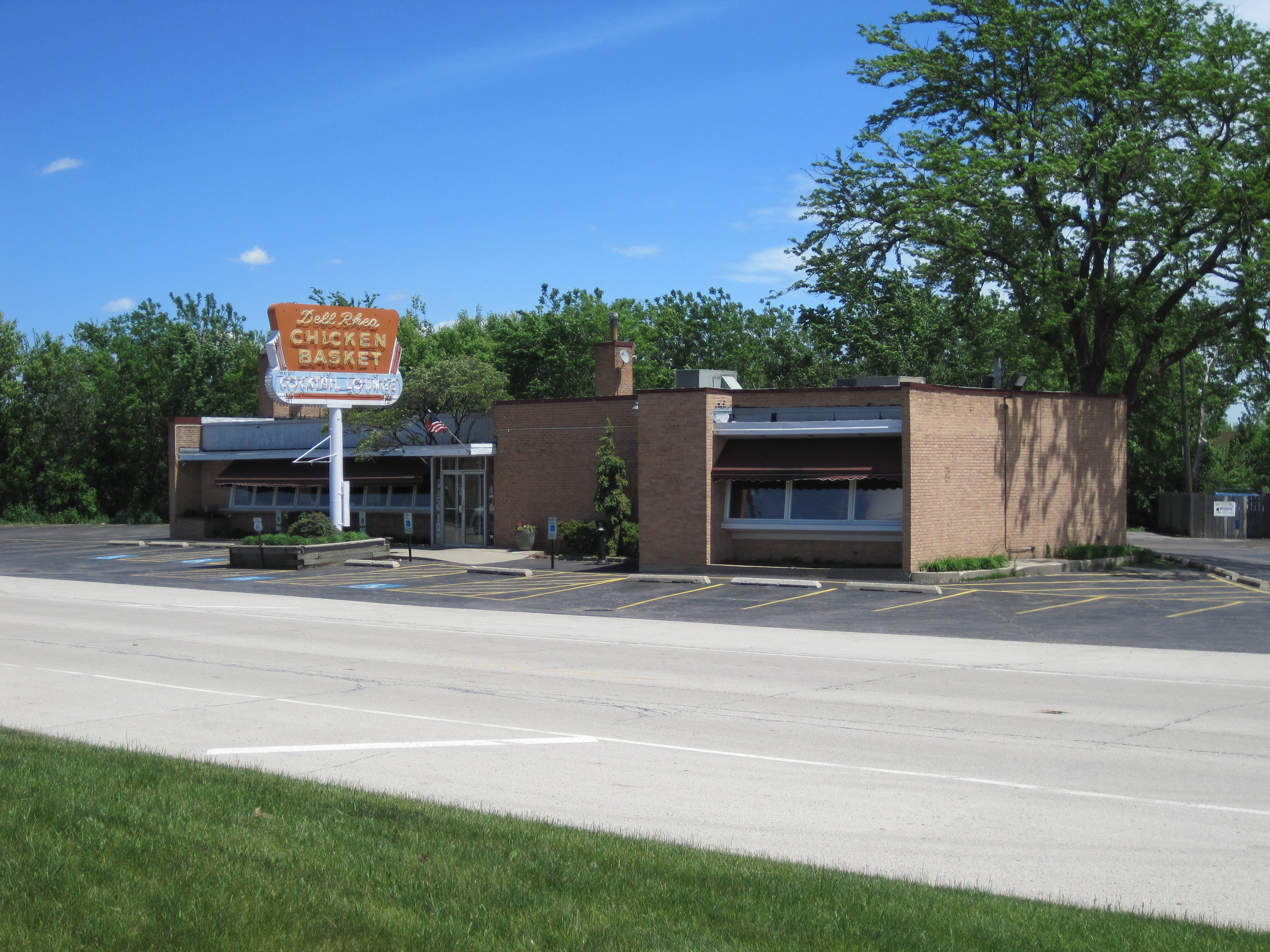
Dell Rhea's Chicken Basket, Willowbrook, Illinois

Originally an unincorporated area of nearby Darien, Willowbrook grew from the Ridgemoor subdivision. It was named after a grove of willows along a local creek, which flows into Waterfall Glen. It was incorporated as a village in 1960 Construction of U.S. Route 66 along Willowbrook's south edge led to the development of several new gas stations and restaurants. In 1946, Ervin "Irv" Kolarik opened Dell Rhea's Chicken Basket on Route 66. The restaurant became a staple in the community. It continues to operate as one of the last surviving stops on Route 66 in Illinois. The building is listed on the National Register of Historic Places.

In the 1980s, new development began along IL-83 and I-55 as the village population continued to grow. In 1990, a swampy pond along Route 83, was cleaned up and designated as "Willow Pond". A trail has since been built around the pond, and it is known as a popular ice skating spot during the winter season.

== Geography ==
According to the 2021 census gazetteer files, Willowbrook has a total area of 2.63 square miles (6.81 km^{2}), of which 2.57 square miles (6.66 km^{2}) (or 97.94%) is land and 0.05 square miles (0.13 km^{2}) (or 2.06%) is water. Willowbrook is around 23 miles (37 km) from Chicago. It is bordered by the suburban villages of Hinsdale, Westmont, Clarendon Hills, Burr Ridge, and Darien, along with unincorporated areas of DuPage County.

== Demographics ==
Historical population
Census	Pop.	Note	%±
1960	157		—
1970	1,457		828.0%
1980	4,953		239.9%
1990	8,598		73.6%
2000	8,967		4.3%
2010	8,540		−4.8%
2020	9,236		8.1%
U.S. Decennial Census; 2010 2020

As of the 2020 census there were 9,236 people, 3,916 households, and 2,337 families residing in the village. The population density was 3,517.14 inhabitants per square mile (1,357.98/km^{2}). There were 4,509 housing units at an average density of 1,717.06 per square mile (662.96/km^{2}). The racial makeup of the village was 71.77% White, 4.48% African American, 0.30% Native American, 14.63% Asian, 0.03% Pacific Islander, 2.75% from other races, and 6.03% from two or more races. Hispanic or Latino of any race were 7.94% of the population.

There were 3,916 households, out of which 19.0% had children under the age of 18 living with them, 51.61% were married couples living together, 7.02% had a female householder with no husband present, and 40.32% were non-families. 35.29% of all households were made up of individuals, and 14.89% had someone living alone who was 65 years of age or older. The average household size was 2.82 and the average family size was 2.17.

The village's age distribution consisted of 15.0% under the age of 18, 7.1% from 18 to 24, 24.5% from 25 to 44, 28.9% from 45 to 64, and 24.6% who were 65 years of age or older. The median age was 48.8 years. For every 100 females, there were 81.7 males. For every 100 females age 18 and over, there were 77.5 males.

The median income for a household in the village was $86,364, and the median income for a family was $117,415. Males had a median income of $65,748 versus $45,833 for females. The per capita income for the village was $54,805. About 5.0% of families and 5.4% of the population were below the poverty line, including 4.9% of those under age 18 and 9.3% of those age 65 or over.

Willowbrook village, Illinois – Racial and ethnic composition Note: the US Census treats Hispanic/Latino as an ethnic category. This table excludes Latinos from the racial categories and assigns them to a separate category. Hispanics/Latinos may be of any race.
Race / Ethnicity (NH = Non-Hispanic)	Pop 2000	Pop 2010	Pop 2020	% 2000	% 2010	% 2020
White alone (NH)	7,348	6,378	6,486	81.94%	74.68%	70.23%
Black or African American alone (NH)	213	400	407	2.38%	4.68%	4.41%
Native American or Alaska Native alone (NH)	3	4	7	0.03%	0.05%	0.08%
Asian alone (NH)	890	1,151	1,333	9.93%	13.48%	14.43%
Pacific Islander alone (NH)	3	2	3	0.03%	0.02%	0.03%
Other race alone (NH)	5	9	12	0.06%	0.11%	0.13%
Mixed race or Multiracial (NH)	123	109	255	1.37%	1.28%	2.76%
Hispanic or Latino (any race)	382	487	733	4.26%	5.70%	7.94%
Total	8,967	8,540	9,236	100.00%	100.00%	100.00%

== High cancer rates ==
In September 2018, the Illinois Department of Public Health began a cancer incidence study based on the recommendation of the Agency for Toxic Substances and Disease Registry. The Willowbrook area shows a '300 in a million' cancer risk based on the 2014 National Air Toxics Assessment, far higher than neighboring communities with a '40 in a million' cancer incidence. A local facility, Sterigenics International, Inc., uses a 'probable carcinogen' called Ethylene Oxide to sterilize medical equipment. According to the EPA fact sheet, 'Long-term exposure to ethylene oxide can irritate the eyes, skin, nose, throat, and lungs, and harm the brain and nervous system (causing effects such as headaches, memory loss, numbness). Studies show that breathing air containing elevated ethylene oxide levels over many years increases the risk of some types of cancers, including cancers of the white blood cells (such as non-Hodgkin's lymphoma, myeloma and lymphocytic leukemia); and breast cancer in females.' On September 30, 2019, Sterigenics announced the closing of the Willowbrook facility eliminating key source of cancer causing chemical.
