= Soulsby Service Station =

- U.S. National Register of Historic Places
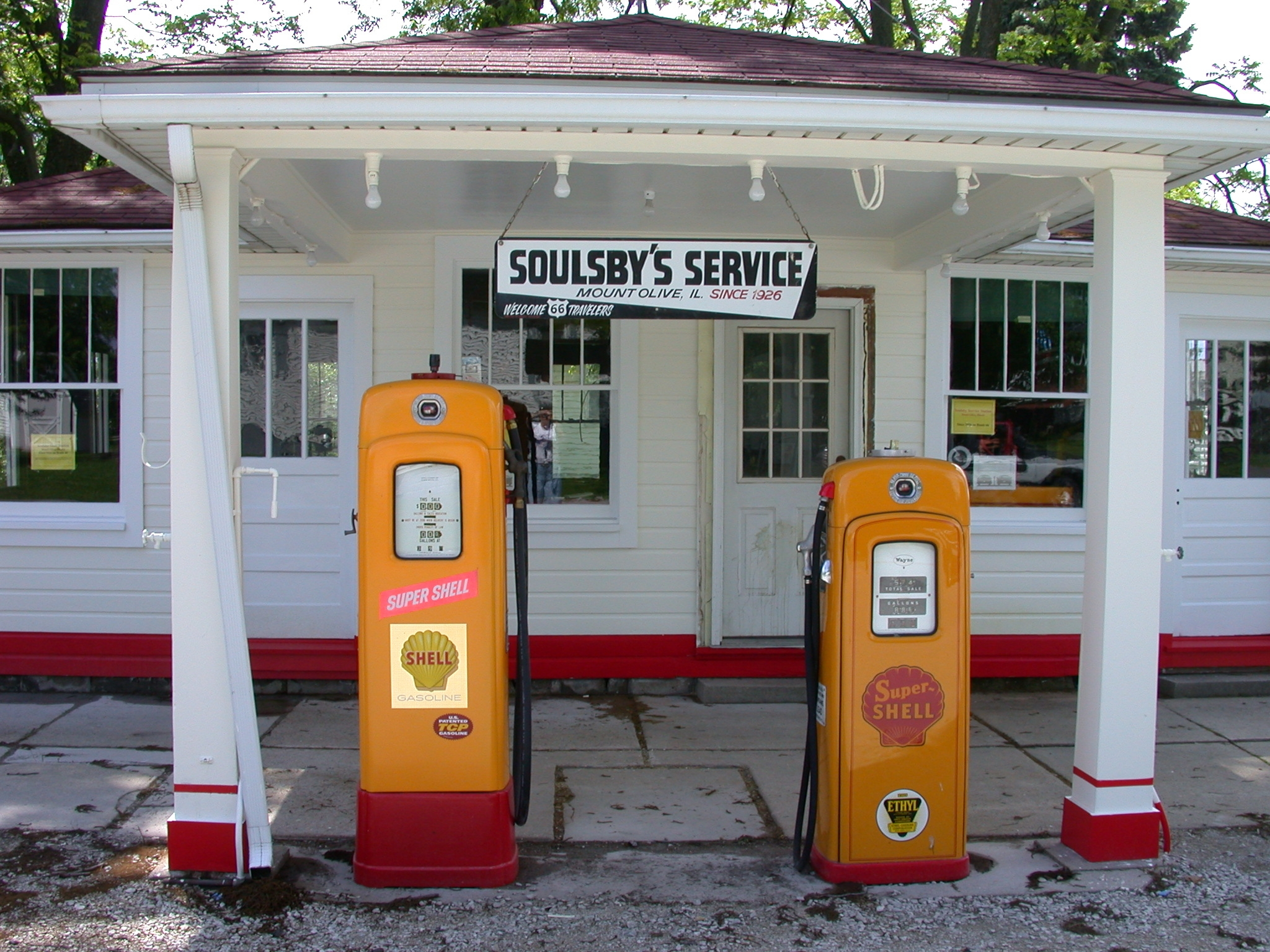

- Location within Illinois Location within the United States
- Location: 710 West First Street, Mount Olive, Illinois
- Coordinates: 39°4′16.0428″N 89°44′7.5264″W
- Area: less than one acre
- Built: 1926
- Architect: Soulsby, Henry
- Architectural style: House and Canopy Gas Station
- MPS: Route 66 through Illinois MPS
- NRHP reference No.: 04000420
- Added to NRHP: May 06, 2004

The Soulsby Service Station is a historic service station in Mount Olive, Illinois. The station is located along historic U.S. Route 66 and is the oldest usable service station on the highway in Illinois. It serves as an example of the house and canopy gas station design.

== Description ==
The Soulsby Service Station consists of a one-story 30 feet 6 inches (9.30 m) by 24 feet 3 inches (7.39 m) building with a canopy covering two gas pumps on its eastern facade. The building's pine siding is painted tan with yellow and red stripes along the bottom to match the branding of the Shell gasoline the station sold. The building has five doors, including three on its eastern wall, which allowed the Soulsbys to enter and exit without turning. A small room in the center of the building served as the station's office. The two gas pumps are not original to the station and were provided by a local Shell memorabilia collector. The property also includes a ramp for auto repairs, as the station did not have a garage; when repair business declined in the 1950s, Russell Soulsby grew an oak tree between the ramp's sides to prevent its unauthorized use.

== History ==
Henry Soulsby built the station in 1926 after an injury forced him to leave the mining industry. The United States Numbered Highway System was created the same year, and Soulsby predicted that a new highway through Mount Olive would create demand for gasoline. Henry operated the station along with his children Russell and Ola Soulsby, who assumed operation of the station after Henry retired. Russell, a World War II naval communications technician, also operated a radio and TV repair business out of the station; this side business kept the station afloat as Interstate 55 diverted highway traffic away from the site in the late 1950s. Russell also played clarinet and saxophone, and he met his wife Elizabeth while playing a dance in Litchfield.

The station stopped pumping gas in 1991 and closed in 1993. Ola died in 1996, and Russell sold the property to his neighbor Mike Dragovich in 1997 before dying in 1999. Dragovich restored the station to its historic appearance in 2003, and it currently operates as a small museum.
