= Washington Township, Carroll County, Illinois =

Washington Township
- Township
- Location in Carroll County

- Carroll County's location in Illinois
- Coordinates: 42°09′50″N 90°10′11″W
- Country: United States
- State: Illinois
- County: Carroll

Government
  - Supervisor: Julie Brigham

Area
  - Total: 39.74 sq mi (102.9 km^{2})
  - Land: 35.39 sq mi (91.7 km^{2})
  - Water: 4.35 sq mi (11.3 km^{2}) 10.95%
- Elevation: 660 ft (200 m)

Population (2020)
  - Total: 317
  - Density: 8.96/sq mi (3.46/km^{2})
- Time zone: UTC-6 (CST)
  - Summer (DST): UTC-5 (CDT)
- ZIP codes: 61028, 61074
- FIPS code: 17-015-79020

Washington Township is one of twelve townships in Carroll County, Illinois, USA. As of the 2020 census, its population was 317 and it contained 177 housing units.

== Geography ==
According to the 2010 census, the township has a total area of 39.74 square miles (102.9 km^{2}), of which 35.39 square miles (91.7 km^{2}) (or 89.05%) is land and 4.35 square miles (11.3 km^{2}) (or 10.95%) is water.

=== Cities, towns, villages ===
- Savanna (north edge)

=== Unincorporated towns ===
- Arnold
- Blackhawk
- Marcus

(This list is based on USGS data and may include former settlements.)

=== Cemeteries ===
The township contains Mosquito Hill Cemetery which is also known as St. Peter's Evangelical Lutheran Cemetery. The cemetery is the site of the former St. Matthew's Evangelical Lutheran Church.

=== Major highways ===
- Illinois Route 84

=== Rivers ===
- Mississippi River

=== Lakes ===
- Buffalo Lake
- Horseshoe Lake
- Lundy Lake

=== Landmarks ===
- Mississippi Palisades State Park (vast majority)
- Savanna Army Depot

== Demographics ==
As of the 2020 census there were 317 people, 194 households, and 125 families residing in the township. The population density was 7.94 inhabitants per square mile (3.07/km^{2}). There were 177 housing units at an average density of 4.43 per square mile (1.71/km^{2}). The racial makeup of the township was 96.85% White, 0.95% African American, 0.00% Native American, 0.00% Asian, 0.00% Pacific Islander, 0.00% from other races, and 2.21% from two or more races. Hispanic or Latino of any race were 1.58% of the population.

There were 194 households, out of which 12.90% had children under the age of 18 living with them, 59.28% were married couples living together, 0.00% had a female householder with no spouse present, and 35.57% were non-families. 12.40% of all households were made up of individuals, and 5.70% had someone living alone who was 65 years of age or older. The average household size was 2.08 and the average family size was 2.38.

The township's age distribution consisted of 13.6% under the age of 18, 20.5% from 18 to 24, 19.2% from 25 to 44, 21.5% from 45 to 64, and 25.0% who were 65 years of age or older. The median age was 41.9 years. For every 100 females, there were 92.4 males. For every 100 females age 18 and over, there were 95.0 males.

The median income for a household in the township was $68,947, and the median income for a family was $76,250. Males had a median income of $38,333 versus $23,906 for females. The per capita income for the township was $33,681. About 0.0% of families and 2.7% of the population were below the poverty line, including 0.0% of those under age 18 and 10.9% of those age 65 or over.

Historical population
Census	Pop.	Note	%±
2010	356		—
2020	317		−11.0%
U.S. Decennial Census

== School districts ==
- West Carroll Community Unit School District 314

== Political districts ==
- Illinois' 16th congressional district
- State House District 71
- State Senate District 36
