= Freedom Township, Illinois =

Freedom Township may refer to one of the following places in the State of Illinois:

- Freedom Township, Carroll County, Illinois
- Freedom Township, LaSalle County, Illinois

See also

- Freedom Township (disambiguation)
