= Carroll Lake =

Carroll Lake or Lake Carroll may refer to:

- Carroll Lake (Ontario-Manitoba), a lake in Canada
- Lake Carroll (Illinois), a man-made lake in Carroll County, Illinois
- Lake Carroll, Florida, a former census-designated place, now split between Carrollwood (CDP), Florida and Carrollwood Village, Florida
- Lake Carroll, Illinois, a census-designated place
