= Salem Township, Illinois =

Salem Township, Illinois may refer to one of the following townships:

- Salem Township, Carroll County, Illinois
- Salem Township, Knox County, Illinois
- Salem Township, Marion County, Illinois

There is also:

- New Salem Township, McDonough County, Illinois
- New Salem Township, Pike County, Illinois

See also

- Salem Township (disambiguation)
