= Salem Township, Indiana =

Salem Township, Indiana may refer to one of the following places:

- Salem Township, Delaware County, Indiana
- Salem Township, Pulaski County, Indiana
- Salem Township, Steuben County, Indiana

== See also ==
- Salem Township (disambiguation)
