= Blackhawk, Illinois =

- Unincorporated community
- Location within Illinois Location within the United States
- Coordinates: 42°11′15″N 90°13′26″W
- Country: United States
- State: Illinois
- County: Carroll
- Elevation: 597 ft (182 m)
- Time zone: UTC-6 (Central (CST))
  - Summer (DST): UTC-5 (CDT)
- Area codes: 815 & 779
- GNIS feature ID: 422470

Blackhawk was an unincorporated village built during World War II in Carroll County, Illinois, United States. It is located near Illinois Route 84, north of Savanna.

During World War II, "Blackhawk Village" was built as an emergency housing project in 1943 to provide homes for employees of Savanna Army Depot and their families. It housed about 1100 people and included 45 apartment buildings. The community had its own post office, grocery store, community hall, and children's playground.

The original plan was for the buildings to last five years, but its life was extended during the Korean War. By late 1958, only 12 families and 10 apartment buildings remained, and the village was closed down in January 1959. By 1976 only five buildings remained and the General Services Administration sold off the land.
