= Fairhaven Township, Illinois =

Fairhaven Township
- Township
- Location in Carroll County

- Carroll County's location in Illinois
- Coordinates: 41°58′54″N 89°55′38″W
- Country: United States
- State: Illinois
- County: Carroll

Government
  - Supervisor: Janice M. Queckboerner

Area
  - Total: 38.18 sq mi (98.9 km^{2})
  - Land: 38.18 sq mi (98.9 km^{2})
  - Water: 0 sq mi (0 km^{2}) 0%
- Elevation: 846 ft (258 m)

Population (2020)
  - Total: 757
  - Density: 19.8/sq mi (7.66/km^{2})
- Time zone: UTC-6 (CST)
  - Summer (DST): UTC-5 (CDT)
- ZIP codes: 61014, 61053, 61285
- FIPS code: 17-015-24881

Fairhaven Township is one of twelve townships in Carroll County, Illinois, United States. As of the 2020 census, its population was 757 and it contained 399 housing units.

== Geography ==
According to the 2010 census, the township has a total area of 38.18 square miles (98.9 km^{2}), all land.

=== Cities ===
- Chadwick

=== Cemeteries ===
The township contains these four cemeteries: Black Oak Lutheran, Chadwick Methodist, Fairhaven and Hope Brethren.

=== Major highways ===
- Illinois Route 40
- Illinois Route 78

== Demographics ==
As of the 2020 census there were 757 people, 397 households, and 242 families residing in the township. The population density was 19.81 inhabitants per square mile (7.65/km^{2}). There were 399 housing units at an average density of 10.44 per square mile (4.03/km^{2}). The racial makeup of the township was 96.70% White, 0.26% African American, 0.00% Native American, 0.79% Asian, 0.00% Pacific Islander, 0.00% from other races, and 2.25% from two or more races. Hispanic or Latino of any race were 2.25% of the population.

There were 397 households, out of which 17.90% had children under the age of 18 living with them, 47.61% were married couples living together, 9.07% had a female householder with no spouse present, and 39.04% were non-families. 32.70% of all households were made up of individuals, and 9.80% had someone living alone who was 65 years of age or older. The average household size was 2.09 and the average family size was 2.62.

The township's age distribution consisted of 16.3% under the age of 18, 6.4% from 18 to 24, 20.8% from 25 to 44, 38.2% from 45 to 64, and 18.4% who were 65 years of age or older. The median age was 50.4 years. For every 100 females, there were 118.5 males. For every 100 females age 18 and over, there were 108.7 males.

The median income for a household in the township was $51,250, and the median income for a family was $63,333. Males had a median income of $36,683 versus $25,530 for females. The per capita income for the township was $27,504. About 7.0% of families and 11.6% of the population were below the poverty line, including 33.3% of those under age 18 and 2.6% of those age 65 or over.

Historical population
Census	Pop.	Note	%±
2010	910		—
2020	757		−16.8%
U.S. Decennial Census

== School districts ==
- Chadwick-Milledgeville Community Unit School District 399

== Political districts ==
- Illinois' 16th congressional district
- State House District 71
- State Senate District 36
