= John Acker =

John Acker may refer to:

- John Acker (Illinois politician)
- John Acker (Pennsylvania politician)
- John Acker (Virginia politician)

== See also ==
- John Ecker (disambiguation)
