= Arbor Hills Landfill =

Landfill in Salem Township, Washtenaw County, Michigan, United States

Project
- Opening date: 1970s
- Status: Operating
- Size: 337-acre campus / 242 permitted acres
- Owner: GFL Environmental
- Website: gflenv.com/arbor-hills/

Location
- Interactive map of Arbor Hills Landfill
- Coordinates: 42.4012°N 83.5572°W
- Country: United States
- State: Michigan
- Community: Salem Township

Area
  - Total: 337 acres (136 ha)

Arbor Hills Landfill is a municipal solid waste landfill in Salem Township, Washtenaw County, Michigan, United States, near the border with Wayne County. The site, formerly a gravel pit, has operated as a landfill since the 1970s. Since October 2020, it has been operated by the Canadian waste-management company GFL Environmental, which acquired it from Advanced Disposal Services. The landfill is part of a 337-acre waste-management campus and received about 1.88 million tons of waste in 2025, which reporting described as the fourth-largest volume among Michigan landfills.

The landfill has been the subject of environmental complaints, regulatory action and litigation concerning odors, landfill-gas emissions and other environmental issues. In 2022, Michigan regulators reached a consent judgment with the landfill's operator that included a $355,109 civil penalty and approximately $1.955 million in supplemental environmental projects. State regulators have also documented elevated temperatures in parts of the landfill and, during a June 2026 inspection, reported numerous surface-methane exceedances and impairment of about half of its vertical gas-collection wells. GFL has proposed expanding the landfill by about 90 acres north of West Six Mile Road, which the company estimates would extend its operating life by approximately 11 years; the proposal has drawn opposition from some residents of neighboring Northville Township.

== History and ownership ==
The site was a gravel pit before it began operating as a landfill in the 1970s. It was later owned and operated by Advanced Disposal Services, which withdrew a proposed expansion in 2016 amid public opposition. In October 2020, GFL Environmental acquired the landfill as part of a package of divestiture assets stemming from the merger of Waste Management and Advanced Disposal.

== Operations ==
The landfill occupies about 337 acres within a larger waste-management campus that also includes recycling, composting, household-hazardous-waste collection, and a renewable natural gas facility developed as a joint venture between GFL Environmental and OPAL Fuels. In 2025 it received approximately 1.88 million tons of waste; reporting described this as the fourth-largest annual volume among Michigan landfills, and stated that the facility's existing capacity was projected to be exhausted around 2032.

== Environmental and regulatory issues ==
=== Odor complaints, 2020 lawsuit and 2022 settlement ===
The Michigan Department of Environment, Great Lakes, and Energy (EGLE) began receiving numerous odor complaints from nearby residents in 2016, when the landfill was operated by Advanced Disposal Services. In October 2020—the same month GFL Environmental acquired the site—the Michigan Attorney General, on behalf of EGLE, filed a civil lawsuit in Ingham County Circuit Court against the landfill's operating entity, alleging violations of the state's air-quality and solid-waste laws and the creation of a public nuisance. In March 2022, under GFL's ownership, the parties entered a consent judgment that imposed a $355,109 civil penalty and required supplemental environmental projects valued at about $1.955 million—together valued at more than $2.3 million—including the operation of a real-time perimeter air-monitoring network with a public-facing website.

=== Elevated temperature ===
Parts of the Arbor Hills landfill have experienced elevated internal temperatures. Such conditions are known as elevated-temperature landfill events, which the U.S. Environmental Protection Agency describes as occurring when abnormal chemical reactions in buried waste generate heat above regulatory thresholds and can alter landfill-gas composition and cause accelerated settlement, odors, and leachate seeps. Bloomberg Businessweek has reported that such landfills are overseen through a fragmented, state-by-state regulatory system with no centralized tracking.

Landfill gas-collection wells are generally operated below about 55 °C (131 °F), though operators may obtain a "higher operating value" authorization to exceed that limit. EGLE has granted such authorizations at Arbor Hills, allowing specified wells to operate at temperatures as high as 180 °F.

In a June 2026 surface-emission-monitoring inspection targeting suspected problem areas, EGLE's Air Quality Division reported that about half of the site's vertical gas-collection wells showed signs of impairment—which it noted was above average for the landfills it inspects—and recorded 75 locations where surface methane exceeded the 500-ppm-above-background threshold, the highest at 148,682 ppm.

=== Northville Township litigation and Cell 6A ===
In November 2021, neighboring Northville Township sued the landfill's operator, alleging that it had released noxious odors and air contaminants and had discharged wastewater into Johnson Creek and the township's sewer system in violation of prior agreements; the township sought an injunction. After the landfill opened a new disposal area known as Cell 6A in July 2023, the township asked a Wayne County Circuit Court in October 2023 to order the cell closed, citing methane and odor and stating that residents had filed 462 complaints between July and October 2023. The landfill and EGLE agreed to implement additional measures by January 2024.

=== Arbor Hills Energy, Clean Air Act settlement ===
Adjacent to the landfill is a landfill-gas-to-energy facility operated by Arbor Hills Energy LLC, a separate entity that burns landfill gas in gas turbines to generate electricity. In September 2021, the United States Department of Justice, the Environmental Protection Agency and the state of Michigan announced a Clean Air Act settlement with Arbor Hills Energy resolving alleged exceedances of the facility's permitted sulfur dioxide emission limits. The company agreed to pay a $750,000 civil penalty, divided evenly between the federal government and the state, and to either build a renewable natural gas facility or install a sulfur-treatment system reducing sulfur-dioxide emissions by 64 percent by March 2023.

=== PFAS ===
In 2019, Michigan identified the landfill as a site of interest in its statewide investigation of per- and polyfluoroalkyl substances (PFAS). EGLE requested sampling of groundwater and leachate at the site; the state reported that PFAS levels in seven nearby residential wells and one Type II well were below the Part 201 drinking-water criteria, and that its investigation of the source and extent of the PFAS was continuing.

== Proposed expansion and community response ==
In late 2024, GFL asked EGLE for an advisory analysis of a proposed expansion that would add about 90 acres north of West Six Mile Road and, by the company's estimate, extend the landfill's operating life by roughly 11 years. The proposal drew continued opposition from some Northville Township residents living downwind of the site, who cited concerns about odors and public health; Salem Township, by contrast, receives an estimated $3 million to $3.5 million a year in revenue related to the landfill. GFL presented the plan to the Washtenaw County Materials Management Planning Committee on September 9, 2026; a county official said he expected the committee to make a recommendation to the county Board of Commissioners by around April 2027, after which EGLE would have final authority over whether to permit a new landfill area.

== See also ==
- Landfill
- GFL Environmental
- Michigan Department of Environment, Great Lakes, and Energy
