= Bina Deneen =

First Lady of Illinois

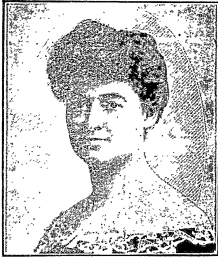
- Bina Deneen in 1905.

First Lady of Illinois
- In role 1904–1912
- Governor: Charles S. Deneen
- Preceded by: Helen Wadsworth Yates
- Succeeded by: Elizabeth J. Kelly Dunne

Personal details
- Born: Bina Maloney; February 14, 1868 Mount Carroll Township, Illinois, U.S.
- Died: October 30, 1950 (aged 82) Chicago, Illinois, U.S.
- Resting place: Oak Woods Cemetery
- Party: Republican
- Spouse: Charles S. Deneen
- Education: Mount Carroll Seminary

Bina Deneen (née Maloney; February 14, 1868 – October 30, 1950) was an American civic leader who served as the First Lady of Illinois from 1904 to 1912. She was the first two-term first lady of Illinois, and the first to give birth in the Illinois Executive Mansion. She was the wife of Charles S. Deneen. Known at the time as "the ideal wife for a governor" for her calm and unassuming style, she was also an active participant in her husband's campaigns, and in the woman's club movement.

== Early life and education ==
Bina Day Maloney was born on February 14, 1868, to a prosperous Carroll County, Illinois farm family. She was born and raised in rural Mount Carroll Township, where she attended the Big Cut district school. Her father was the township's commissioner of roads. Because her parents moved into the town of Mount Carroll several decades later, she was sometimes inaccurately reported as having been born and raised in Mount Carroll itself.

In her teens in the 1880s, she taught school for a time in Sac County, Iowa. She studied at the Mount Carroll Seminary (later known as Shimer College), exiting in 1890. Although then as now primarily a liberal arts institution, the school also offered courses in stenography and typewriting. Deneen performed well enough in her studies to be hired as an instructor of these subjects in 1889 and 1890.

Subsequently, she moved to Chicago and worked briefly as a stenographer or typist, living in a boardinghouse. She married Chicago law student Charles S. Deneen, the brother of a fellow boardinghouse resident, in Princeton, Illinois in 1891. Both hailed from strongly Methodist families; the marriage rites were performed by Mrs. Deneen's sister's husband, a Methodist minister.

Deneen's great-grandson is actor Jason Beghe.

== Political career ==
I've had an awfully full life, but I've also had an delightful time out of life. I know I'm getting older, but it's only because the birthdays are piling up. I'm keenly interested in what's going on, and I like to watch things happen.
—Bina Deneen, 1930

Deneen played ae part in each of her husband's campaigns, although chiefly behind the scenes. These campaigns began at the ward committeeman level in Chicago, quickly rising to Cook County state's attorney and the state legislature.

Charles became the first two-term governor of Illinois, serving from 1904 to 1912. As the First Lady of Illinois, Deneen cut a demure figure, describing herself as a "home woman". She was the first First Lady of Illinois to have a child while living in the governor's mansion—her fourth child, Bina, born in 1906—a feat that would not be repeated until the birth of Samantha Thompson in 1978. She remains the only First Lady of Illinois to give birth in the executive mansion.

As First Lady of Illinois, Deneen was in charge of entertaining the various visitors to the executive mansion. Notable among these were president William Howard Taft, for whom a special ramp had to be installed, as well as former president Theodore Roosevelt, and the French and British ambassadors.

Like many other early Shimer College alumnae, Bina was active in the woman's club movement. She served as president of the Englewood Woman's Club, dedicated to the "promotion of the highest interest of humanity through Sociological, Literary, Educational, Art, and Music work," and was also active in the Chicago Woman's Club, which she joined in 1915. She was also active in the First Methodist Episcopal Church of Englewood.

The Deneens returned to electoral politics in 1924, when Charles ran successfully for US Senate. Deneen described herself as a "passive politician", but stumped actively for her husband during his final, failed Senate campaign in 1930. Feeling uncomfortable with traditional political speeches, however, she confined herself to expressing her gratitude and recognition of the campaign workers' efforts.

In the violent "Pineapple Primary" of 1928, in which the organizations of Deneen and "Big Bill" Thompson squared off against one another, the Deneens' home in Englewood was bombed, destroying the front porch. The 61st political bombing in Chicago that year, it marked a significant turning point in the campaign, which ended in a decisive victory for the Deneenites. Mrs. Deneen's calm response was considered noteworthy; she recalled later that "as we were in Washington and no one was hurt, and none of my paintings and books in the front of the house were damaged to any extent, I felt it hardly called for hysterics."

== Death and legacy ==
After her husband's death, Deneen had moved from Englewood to nearby Hyde Park. She died on October 30, 1950, and was laid to rest in the Oak Woods Cemetery. She survived her husband by ten years. The home where the Deneens lived in Englewood still stands at 457 W. 61st Place in Chicago.

== Works cited ==
- E. George Thiem, ed. (1968). Carroll County: A Goodly Heritage. Kable Printing Company.
- "Mount Carroll Seminary". The Oread of Mount Carroll Seminary. Shimer College. 1890.
