= Wysox Township =

Wysox Township may refer to the following townships in the United States:

- Wysox Township, Carroll County, Illinois
- Wysox Township, Pennsylvania
