= Elkhorn Grove Township, Illinois =

Elkhorn Grove Township
- Township
- Location in Carroll County

- Carroll County's location in Illinois
- Coordinates: 41°58′00″N 89°42′00″W
- Country: United States
- State: Illinois
- County: Carroll

Government
  - Supervisor: Keith Oncken

Area
  - Total: 19.5 sq mi (51 km^{2})
  - Land: 19.5 sq mi (51 km^{2})
  - Water: 0 sq mi (0 km^{2}) 0%
- Elevation: 866 ft (264 m)

Population (2020)
  - Total: 197
  - Density: 10.1/sq mi (3.90/km^{2})
- Time zone: UTC-6 (CST)
  - Summer (DST): UTC-5 (CDT)
- ZIP codes: 61051, 61064
- FIPS code: 17-015-23321

Elkhorn Grove Township is one of twelve townships in Carroll County, Illinois, USA. As of the 2020 census, its population was 197 and it contained 89 housing units.

== Geography ==
According to the 2010 census, the township has a total area of 19.5 square miles (51 km^{2}), all land.

=== Unincorporated towns ===
- Hazelhurst

(This list is based on USGS data and may include former settlements.)

=== Cemeteries ===
The township contains South Elkhorn Methodist Cemetery.

== Demographics ==
As of the 2020 census there were 197 people, 78 households, and 69 families residing in the township. The population density was 10.09 inhabitants per square mile (3.90/km^{2}). There were 89 housing units at an average density of 4.56 per square mile (1.76/km^{2}). The racial makeup of the township was 96.95% White, 0.51% African American, 0.00% Native American, 0.00% Asian, 0.00% Pacific Islander, 0.00% from other races, and 2.54% from two or more races. Hispanic or Latino of any race were 1.52% of the population.

There were 78 households, out of which 73.10% had children under the age of 18 living with them, 79.49% were married couples living together, 8.97% had a female householder with no spouse present, and 11.54% were non-families. No households were made up of individuals. The average household size was 3.08 and the average family size was 2.94.

The township's age distribution consisted of 32.5% under the age of 18, none from 18 to 24, 17% from 25 to 44, 50.5% from 45 to 64, and none who were 65 years of age or older. The median age was 46.1 years. For every 100 females, there were 175.9 males. For every 100 females age 18 and over, there were 86.2 males.

The median income for a household in the township was $126,786, and the median income for a family was $127,772. Males had a median income of $58,565 versus $56,250 for females. The per capita income for the township was $39,084. No families and 8.3% of the population were below the poverty line.

Historical population
Census	Pop.	Note	%±
2010	229		—
2020	197		−14.0%
U.S. Decennial Census

== School districts ==
- Chadwick-Milledgeville Community Unit School District 399

== Political districts ==
- Illinois' 16th congressional district
- State House District 89
- State Senate District 45
