= Savanna Township, Illinois =

Savanna Township
- Township
- Location in Carroll County

- Carroll County's location in Illinois
- Coordinates: 42°04′08″N 90°07′39″W
- Country: United States
- State: Illinois
- County: Carroll

Government
  - Supervisor: Ruth Carey

Area
  - Total: 20.92 sq mi (54.2 km^{2})
  - Land: 13.35 sq mi (34.6 km^{2})
  - Water: 7.57 sq mi (19.6 km^{2}) 36.19%
- Elevation: 590 ft (180 m)

Population (2020)
  - Total: 3,432
  - Density: 257.1/sq mi (99.26/km^{2})
- Time zone: UTC-6 (CST)
  - Summer (DST): UTC-5 (CDT)
- ZIP codes: 61074 61285
- FIPS code: 17-015-67834

Savanna Township is one of twelve townships in Carroll County, Illinois, USA. As of the 2020 census, its population was 3,432 and it contained 1,919 housing units.

== Geography ==
According to the 2010 census, the township has a total area of 20.92 square miles (54.2 km^{2}), of which 13.35 square miles (34.6 km^{2}) (or 63.81%) is land and 7.57 square miles (19.6 km^{2}) (or 36.19%) is water.

=== Cities, towns, villages ===
- Savanna (vast majority)

=== Unincorporated towns ===
(This list is based on USGS data and may include former settlements.)

=== Cemeteries ===
The township contains these two cemeteries: Saint Johns and Savanna.

=== Major highways ===
- US Route 52
- Illinois Route 64
- Illinois Route 84

=== Airports and landing strips ===
- Savanna City Hospital Heliport
- Tri-Township Airport

=== Rivers ===
- Mississippi River

=== Lakes ===
- Bowens Lake
- Misquakee Lake
- Spring Lake

=== Landmarks ===
- Mississippi Palisades State Park (south edge)
- Old Mill Park

== Demographics ==
As of the 2020 census there were 3,432 people, 1,780 households, and 855 families residing in the township. The population density was 164.05 inhabitants per square mile (63.34/km^{2}). There were 1,919 housing units at an average density of 91.73 per square mile (35.42/km^{2}). The racial makeup of the township was 88.69% White, 1.66% African American, 0.52% Native American, 0.17% Asian, 0.06% Pacific Islander, 2.97% from other races, and 5.91% from two or more races. Hispanic or Latino of any race were 8.07% of the population.

There were 1,780 households, out of which 18.60% had children under the age of 18 living with them, 40.45% were married couples living together, 6.52% had a female householder with no spouse present, and 51.97% were non-families. 45.70% of all households were made up of individuals, and 21.20% had someone living alone who was 65 years of age or older. The average household size was 1.91 and the average family size was 2.73.

The township's age distribution consisted of 18.8% under the age of 18, 3.6% from 18 to 24, 24.3% from 25 to 44, 27.8% from 45 to 64, and 25.5% who were 65 years of age or older. The median age was 48.5 years. For every 100 females, there were 83.4 males. For every 100 females age 18 and over, there were 86.0 males.

The median income for a household in the township was $32,750, and the median income for a family was $53,205. Males had a median income of $41,230 versus $16,295 for females. The per capita income for the township was $27,342. About 13.6% of families and 13.1% of the population were below the poverty line, including 5.1% of those under age 18 and 15.3% of those age 65 or over.

Historical population
Census	Pop.	Note	%±
2010	3,729		—
2020	3,432		−8.0%
U.S. Decennial Census

== School districts ==
- West Carroll Community Unit School District 314

== Political districts ==
- Illinois' 16th congressional district
- State House District 71
- State Senate District 36
