= Mount Carroll Township, Illinois =

Mount Carroll Township
- Township
- Location in Carroll County

- Carroll County's location in Illinois
- Coordinates: 42°04′10″N 90°01′52″W
- Country: United States
- State: Illinois
- County: Carroll

Government
  - Supervisor: Cheri Jo Piper

Area
  - Total: 37.61 sq mi (97.4 km^{2})
  - Land: 37.53 sq mi (97.2 km^{2})
  - Water: 0.07 sq mi (0.18 km^{2}) 0.19%
- Elevation: 807 ft (246 m)

Population (2020)
  - Total: 1,963
  - Density: 52.30/sq mi (20.20/km^{2})
- Time zone: UTC-6 (CST)
  - Summer (DST): UTC-5 (CDT)
- ZIP codes: 61053, 61074, 61285
- FIPS code: 17-015-50894

Mount Carroll Township is one of twelve townships in Carroll County, Illinois, USA. As of the 2020 census, its population was 1,963 and it contained 1,063 housing units.

== Geography ==
According to the 2010 census, the township has a total area of 37.61 square miles (97.4 km^{2}), of which 37.53 square miles (97.2 km^{2}) (or 99.79%) is land and 0.07 square miles (0.18 km^{2}) (or 0.19%) is water.

=== Cities ===
- Mount Carroll (west three-quarters)

=== Unincorporated towns ===
- Wacker

(This list is based on USGS data and may include former settlements.)

=== Cemeteries ===
The township contains these three cemeteries: Center Hill, Oak Hill and Wacker.

=== Major highways ===
- US Route 52
- Illinois Route 64
- Illinois Route 78

== Demographics ==
As of the 2020 census there were 1,963 people, 947 households, and 553 families residing in the township. The population density was 51.90 inhabitants per square mile (20.04/km^{2}). There were 1,063 housing units at an average density of 28.11 units per square mile (10.85 units/km^{2}). The racial makeup of the township was 94.65% White, 0.41% African American, 0.00% Native American, 0.20% Asian, 0.00% Pacific Islander, 0.66% from other races, and 4.08% from two or more races. Hispanic or Latino of any race were 3.06% of the population.

There were 947 households, out of which 31.30% had children under the age of 18 living with them, 41.08% were married couples living together, 11.72% had a female householder with no spouse present, and 41.61% were non-families. 33.40% of all households were made up of individuals, and 15.50% had someone living alone who was 65 years of age or older. The average household size was 2.16 and the average family size was 2.59.

The township's age distribution consisted of 21.0% under the age of 18, 10.7% from 18 to 24, 21.7% from 25 to 44, 25.8% from 45 to 64, and 20.9% who were 65 years of age or older. The median age was 40.4 years. For every 100 females, there were 78.0 males. For every 100 females age 18 and over, there were 85.2 males.

The median income for a household in the township was $55,819, and the median income for a family was $60,250. Males had a median income of $44,327 versus $30,472 for females. The per capita income for the township was $28,802. About 10.5% of families and 11.7% of the population were below the poverty line, including 22.6% of those under age 18 and 3.8% of those age 65 or over.

Historical population
Census	Pop.	Note	%±
2010	2,279		—
2020	1,963		−13.9%
U.S. Decennial Census

== School districts ==
- West Carroll Community Unit School District 314

== Political districts ==
- Illinois' 16th congressional district
- State House District 71
- State Senate District 36

== Notable residents ==
Notable people from the rural portion of Mount Carroll Township include First Lady of Illinois Bina Deneen (1868–1950), who was born and raised there.
