= Salem Township, Minnesota =

Salem Township is the name of some places in the U.S. state of Minnesota:

- Salem Township, Cass County, Minnesota
- Salem Township, Olmsted County, Minnesota

== See also ==
- Salem Township (disambiguation)
