= Freedom Township =

Freedom Township may refer to:

== Arkansas ==
- Freedom Township, Polk County, Arkansas, in Polk County, Arkansas

== Illinois ==
- Freedom Township, Carroll County, Illinois
- Freedom Township, LaSalle County, Illinois

== Iowa ==
- Freedom Township, Hamilton County, Iowa
- Freedom Township, Palo Alto County, Iowa

== Kansas ==
- Freedom Township, Bourbon County, Kansas
- Freedom Township, Ellis County, Kansas
- Freedom Township, Republic County, Kansas

== Michigan ==
- Freedom Township, Michigan

== Minnesota ==
- Freedom Township, Waseca County, Minnesota

== Missouri ==
- Freedom Township, Lafayette County, Missouri

== North Dakota ==
- Freedom Township, Ward County, North Dakota, in Ward County, North Dakota

== Ohio ==
- Freedom Township, Henry County, Ohio
- Freedom Township, Portage County, Ohio
- Freedom Township, Wood County, Ohio

== Pennsylvania ==
- Freedom Township, Adams County, Pennsylvania
- Freedom Township, Blair County, Pennsylvania

== South Dakota ==
- Freedom Township, Faulk County, South Dakota, in Faulk County, South Dakota
