= Arnold, Illinois =

Arnold, Illinois may refer to:

- Arnold, Carroll County, Illinois, an unincorporated community in Carroll County
- Arnold, Morgan County, Illinois, an unincorporated community in Morgan County
