= Alfred Babb =

American politician

Alfred Sullaven Babb (September 24, 1858 – February 11, 1933) was an American farmer, businessman, and politician.

Babb was born on the family farm at Babb's Grove near Pearl City, Stephenson County, Illinois. In 1883, he moved to Shannon, Illinois in Carroll County, Illinois. He was in the farming and bank business. Babb also served as postmaster for Shannon, Illinois. He also served as town clerk, town supervisor and justice of the peace. Babb served in the Illinois House of Representatives as a Republican from 1925 to 1929 and from 1931 to 1932. In the 1932 election, Babb ran for the Illinois Senate and lost the election. He died at his daughter's home in Lanark, Illinois from a heart attack.
