= SFY =

SFY may refer to:

- SFY, the FAA LID code for Tri-Township Airport, Illinois, United States
- SFY, the Indian Railways station code for Shajapur railway station, Madhya Pradesh, India
