= Salem Township, Pennsylvania =

Salem Township is the name of some places in the U.S. state of Pennsylvania:

- Salem Township, Clarion County, Pennsylvania
- Salem Township, Luzerne County, Pennsylvania
- Salem Township, Mercer County, Pennsylvania
- Salem Township, Wayne County, Pennsylvania
- Salem Township, Westmoreland County, Pennsylvania
