= Shannon, Illinois =

Shannon
- Village
- Location of Shannon in Carroll County, Illinois.
- Coordinates: 42°09′09″N 89°44′25″W
- Country: United States
- State: Illinois
- County: Carroll
- Township: Cherry Grove

Government https://shannonillinois.com/
  - Village President: Ryan J. Shaner (Ind.)

Area
  - Total: 0.48 sq mi (1.25 km^{2})
  - Land: 0.48 sq mi (1.25 km^{2})
  - Water: 0 sq mi (0.00 km^{2})
- Elevation: 929 ft (283 m)

Population (2020)
  - Total: 801
  - Density: 1,661.7/sq mi (641.57/km^{2})
- Time zone: UTC-6 (CST)
  - Summer (DST): UTC-5 (CDT)
- ZIP code: 61078
- Area code: 815
- FIPS code: 17-68991
- GNIS feature ID: 2399791
- Website: shannonillinois.com

Shannon is a village in Carroll County, Illinois, United States. The population was 801 at the 2020 census, up from 757 at the 2010 census.

== History ==
The land that would become Shannon was originally known as Lost Springs, consisting of open prairie and spring-fed groves. Following the Black Hawk War, settlers arrived, drawn by the availability of timber, water, and fertile land.

The town's development accelerated in 1859 with the extension of the Illinois Central Railroad line through the region. The new depot was named Shannon, after William Shannon, one of the railroad's directors. He is buried in nearby Freeport City Cemetery.

By 1860, the town was officially platted. Within a decade, Shannon was incorporated and a local government was established.

== Geography ==
According to the 2021 census gazetteer files, Shannon has a total area of 0.48 square miles (1.24 km^{2}), all land.

== Demographics ==
Historical population
| Census | Pop. | Note | %± |
|---|---|---|---|
| 1870 | 635 | | — |
| 1880 | 713 | | 12.3% |
| 1890 | 591 | | −17.1% |
| 1900 | 678 | | 14.7% |
| 1910 | 633 | | −6.6% |
| 1920 | 636 | | 0.5% |
| 1930 | 575 | | −9.6% |
| 1940 | 561 | | −2.4% |
| 1950 | 668 | | 19.1% |
| 1960 | 766 | | 14.7% |
| 1970 | 848 | | 10.7% |
| 1980 | 938 | | 10.6% |
| 1990 | 887 | | −5.4% |
| 2000 | 854 | | −3.7% |
| 2010 | 757 | | −11.4% |
| 2020 | 801 | | 5.8% |
U.S. Decennial Census

As of the 2020 census there were 801 people, 326 households, and 212 families residing in the village. The population density was 1,661.83 inhabitants per square mile (641.64/km^{2}). There were 367 housing units at an average density of 761.41 per square mile (293.98/km^{2}). The racial makeup of the village was 94.01% White, 1.12% African American, 0.25% Native American, 0.12% Asian, 0.75% from other races, and 3.75% from two or more races. Hispanic or Latino of any race were 4.74% of the population.

There were 326 households, out of which 27.3% had children under the age of 18 living with them, 56.13% were married couples living together, 3.37% had a female householder with no husband present, and 34.97% were non-families. 32.82% of all households were made up of individuals, and 20.55% had someone living alone who was 65 years of age or older. The average household size was 2.89 and the average family size was 2.29.

The village's age distribution consisted of 20.7% under the age of 18, 8.2% from 18 to 24, 21% from 25 to 44, 23.6% from 45 to 64, and 26.4% who were 65 years of age or older. The median age was 45.0 years. For every 100 females, there were 96.6 males. For every 100 females age 18 and over, there were 98.3 males.

The median income for a household in the village was $52,500, and the median income for a family was $67,500. Males had a median income of $41,776 versus $30,893 for females. The per capita income for the village was $30,005. About 4.7% of families and 6.8% of the population were below the poverty line, including 13.0% of those under age 18 and 7.6% of those age 65 or over.

=== Religion ===
Shannon is home to three churches, Shannon Baptist, St. Wendelin's Catholic and Bethel United Methodist.

== Education ==
Shannon's initial commitment to education was marked by the construction of a two-story brick schoolhouse on land donated by William Shannon. This building served both elementary and high school students and was expanded over time to accommodate a growing student population.

Prior to consolidation, thirteen one-room schoolhouses served the surrounding rural areas. These were later consolidated into a centralized system within Shannon.

The school facilities were expanded to include a gymnasium, which also provided additional classroom space. A new high school was also constructed, with further additions being made as needed.

The school's mascot and colors have changed through consolidation. The original mascot was the Shamrocks, with colors of orange and green. Following local consolidation, the mascot was changed to the Eagles, and the colors became orange and black. When Shannon and Lanark consolidated to form the Eastland School District, the school became the Cougars, with the colors blue (from Lanark) and orange (from Shannon).

== Notable person ==
- Alfred Babb (1858–1933), farmer, businessman, served as postmaster for Shannon.
