= York Township, Carroll County, Illinois =

York Township
- Township
- Location in Carroll County

- Carroll County's location in Illinois
- Coordinates: 41°57′53″N 90°03′45″W
- Country: United States
- State: Illinois
- County: Carroll

Government
  - Supervisor: Clifford Durward

Area
  - Total: 56.39 sq mi (146.0 km^{2})
  - Land: 47.47 sq mi (122.9 km^{2})
  - Water: 8.91 sq mi (23.1 km^{2})
- Elevation: 610 ft (186 m)

Population (2020)
  - Total: 2,739
  - Density: 57.70/sq mi (22.28/km^{2})
- Time zone: UTC-6 (CST)
  - Summer (DST): UTC-5 (CDT)
- ZIP codes: 61014, 61053, 61074, 61252, 61285
- FIPS code: 17-015-83908

York Township is one of twelve townships in Carroll County, Illinois, United States. As of the 2020 census, its population was 2,739 and it contained 905 housing units.

The township was formerly known as Harlem Township until its name was changed in 1850.

== Geography ==
According to the 2021 census gazetteer files, York Township has a total area of 56.39 square miles (146.05 km^{2}), of which 47.47 square miles (122.95 km^{2}) (or 84.20%) is land and 8.91 square miles (23.08 km^{2}) (or 15.80%) is water.

=== Cities, towns, villages ===
- Thomson

=== Unincorporated towns ===
- Argo Fay

(This list is based on USGS data and may include former settlements.)

=== Cemeteries ===
The township contains these two cemeteries: Argo and Lower York.

=== Major highways ===
- Illinois Route 78
- Illinois Route 84

=== Rivers ===
- Mississippi River
- Upper Mississippi River

== Demographics ==
As of the 2020 census there were 2,739 people, 735 households, and 577 families residing in the township. The population density was 48.58 inhabitants per square mile (18.76/km^{2}). There were 905 housing units at an average density of 16.05 per square mile (6.20/km^{2}). The racial makeup of the township was 74.22% White, 21.58% African American, 1.39% Native American, 0.29% Asian, 0.04% Pacific Islander, 0.26% from other races, and 2.23% from two or more races. Hispanic or Latino of any race were 8.43% of the population.

There were 735 households, out of which 17.80% had children under the age of 18 living with them, 66.53% were married couples living together, 9.52% had a female householder with no spouse present, and 21.50% were non-families. 17.60% of all households were made up of individuals, and 9.40% had someone living alone who was 65 years of age or older. The average household size was 2.14 and the average family size was 2.35.

The township's age distribution consisted of 10.4% under the age of 18, 4.5% from 18 to 24, 29.1% from 25 to 44, 32.2% from 45 to 64, and 23.8% who were 65 years of age or older. The median age was 50.6 years. For every 100 females, there were 159.7 males. For every 100 females age 18 and over, there were 150.6 males.

The median income for a household in the township was $64,861, and the median income for a family was $76,563. Males had a median income of $44,609 versus $28,456 for females. The per capita income for the township was $29,653. About 2.1% of families and 4.1% of the population were below the poverty line, including 6.9% of those under age 18 and 3.2% of those age 65 or over.

Historical population
Census	Pop.	Note	%±
2010	1,734		—
2020	2,739		58.0%
U.S. Decennial Census

== School districts ==
- West Carroll Community Unit School District 314

== Political districts ==
- Illinois' 16th congressional district
- State House District 71
- State Senate District 36
