= Hazelhurst, Illinois =

- Unincorporated community
- Location within Illinois Location within the United States
- Coordinates: 41°57′48″N 89°41′10″W
- Country: United States
- State: Illinois
- Counties: Carroll and Ogle
- Elevation: 843 ft (257 m)
- Time zone: UTC-6 (Central (CST))
  - Summer (DST): UTC-5 (CDT)
- Area codes: 815 & 779
- GNIS feature ID: 409992

Hazelhurst is an unincorporated community in Carroll and Ogle counties, Illinois, United States. Hazelhurst is located along a railroad line east of Milledgeville. It is host to a large farm equipment consignment auction every spring and fall by Public Auction Service.
