= David J. Summerville =

American politician

David J. Summerville (March 23, 1875 – August 15, 1948) was an American politician and farmer.

Born in Carroll County, Illinois, Summerville moved with his parents to Iowa. Summerville moved to Wisconsin in 1913. He had taught school in Iowa and then was a farmer. Summerville served on the town board and was chairman. He also served on the district school board. He also served on the Rusk County, Wisconsin Board of Supervisors and on the Road and Bridge Committee. In 1921 and 1923, Summerville served in the Wisconsin State Assembly and was a Republican. From 1925 to 1943, Summerville served as Rusk County Highway Commissioner. In 1943, Governor Walter Goodland appointed Summerville Wisconsin State Highway Commissioner serving until his death. Summerville died in a hospital in Madison, Wisconsin. Summerville was buried in Manning, Iowa.
