= Cherry Grove–Shannon Township, Illinois =

Cherry Grove-Shannon Township
- Township
- Location in Carroll County

- Carroll County's location in Illinois
- Coordinates: 42°09′30″N 89°46′30″W
- Country: United States
- State: Illinois
- County: Carroll

Government
  - Supervisor: Kenneth Moll

Area
  - Total: 53.31 sq mi (138.1 km^{2})
  - Land: 53.3 sq mi (138 km^{2})
  - Water: 0.01 sq mi (0.026 km^{2}) 0.02%
- Elevation: 932 ft (284 m)

Population (2020)
  - Total: 1,539
  - Density: 28.9/sq mi (11.1/km^{2})
- Time zone: UTC-6 (CST)
  - Summer (DST): UTC-5 (CDT)
- ZIP codes: 61046, 61078
- FIPS code: 17-015-12996

Cherry Grove-Shannon Township is one of twelve townships in Carroll County, Illinois, USA. As of the 2020 census, its population was 1,539 and it contained 813 housing units.

== Geography ==
According to the 2010 census, the township has a total area of 53.31 square miles (138.1 km^{2}), of which 53.3 square miles (138 km^{2}) (or 99.98%) is land and 0.01 square miles (0.026 km^{2}) (or 0.02%) is water.

=== Cities ===
- Shannon

=== Unincorporated towns ===
- Georgetown
- Kittredge
- Lake Carroll (part)
- Zier Cors

(This list is based on USGS data and may include former settlements.)

=== Cemeteries ===
The township contains these five cemeteries: Brethren, Cherry Grove Brethren, Saint Wendelin, Shell and Spring Valley.

=== Major highways ===
- Illinois Route 72
- Illinois Route 73

=== Airports and landing strips ===
- Block Airport
- Kenneth Moll Airport
- Swan Valley Farm Airport

== Demographics ==
As of the 2020 census there were 1,539 people, 532 households, and 368 families residing in the township. The population density was 28.70 inhabitants per square mile (11.08/km^{2}). There were 813 housing units at an average density of 15.16 units per square mile (5.85 units/km^{2}). The racial makeup of the township was 94.74% White, 0.58% African American, 0.13% Native American, 0.06% Asian, 0.00% Pacific Islander, 1.10% from other races, and 3.38% from two or more races. Hispanic or Latino of any race were 4.42% of the population.

There were 532 households, out of which 20.10% had children under the age of 18 living with them, 60.53% were married couples living together, 3.57% had a female householder with no spouse present, and 30.83% were non-families. 27.80% of all households were made up of individuals, and 19.00% had someone living alone who was 65 years of age or older. The average household size was 2.38 and the average family size was 2.89.

The township's age distribution consisted of 21.6% under the age of 18, 7.3% from 18 to 24, 13.1% from 25 to 44, 26.1% from 45 to 64, and 31.9% who were 65 years of age or older. The median age was 52.4 years. For every 100 females, there were 93.9 males. For every 100 females age 18 and over, there were 102.4 males.

The median income for a household in the township was $63,750, and the median income for a family was $80,714. Males had a median income of $51,000 versus $30,333 for females. The per capita income for the township was $34,258. About 2.7% of families and 5.2% of the population were below the poverty line, including 7.3% of those under age 18 and 3.7% of those age 65 or over.

Historical population
Census	Pop.	Note	%±
2010	1,485		—
2020	1,539		3.6%
U.S. Decennial Census

== School districts ==
- Eastland Community Unit School District 308
- Pearl City Community Unit School District 200

== Political districts ==
- Illinois's 16th congressional district
- State House District 89
- State Senate District 45

== Notable residents ==
- David Denny (1832–1903), pioneer of Seattle, Washington
