= Helen Scott Hay =

American nurse (1869–1932)

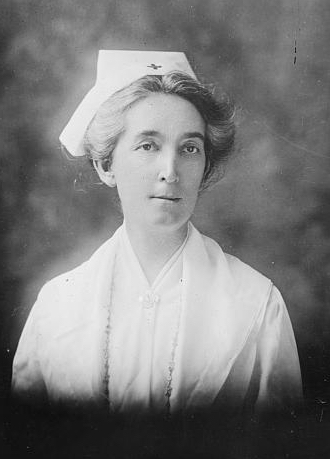
- Helen Scott Hay in 1920, from the American National Red Cross Photograph Collection, Library of Congress.
- Born: January 6, 1869; Carroll County, Illinois
- Died: November 25, 1932 (aged 63); Savanna, Illinois
- Citizenship: American
- Education: Northwestern University
- Occupation: nurse
- Known for: American Red Cross nursing in Europe during and after World War I

Helen Scott Hay (January 6, 1869 – November 25, 1932) was an American Red Cross nurse and nursing educator, working in Kiev and Sofia during World War I. She was awarded the Florence Nightingale Medal by the International Red Cross Society for her contributions.

== Early life and education ==
Helen Scott Hay was born near Lanark, Illinois, the daughter of George Hay and Agnes Pennington Hay. Her father was an immigrant from Scotland. She attended Savanna High School in Savanna, Illinois, studied literature at Northwestern University, and earned her registered nurse degree at the Illinois Training School for Nurses in Chicago, in 1895.

== Career ==
Hay was superintendent at Pasadena Hospital nurses' training program in California in 1905 and 1906, and chaired the Pasadena branch of the Los Angeles County Nurses' Association. She was a member of the council of the California State Nurses' Association, and an associate editor of the Nurses' Journal of the Pacific Coast, a quarterly publication. She was also head nurse at the Iowa State Hospital for the Insane in her early career.

She served as superintendent of the Illinois Training School for Nurses, and as nursing superintendent at Cook County Hospital, from 1906 to 1912. She went to Europe with the American Red Cross in 1914, leading a group of American nurses with Jane Delano. From 1914 to 1915 she was matron of the American Red Cross hospital in Kiev; she described meeting Nicholas II of Russia for a Red Cross magazine. She went to Bulgaria to help establish and lead a nurses' training school there, at the invitation of the Tsaritsa, Eleonore Reuss of Köstritz. In 1917 she was named Director of the Bureau of Nursing Instruction for the American Red Cross, and she helped to organize the U. S. Army School of Nursing in Washington, D.C. She was assigned as Chief Nurse of the Balkans Commission of the American Red Cross in 1918. In 1919 she was at Philippopolis supervising war relief work. In 1920 she succeeded Alice Fitzgerald in Paris as Chief Nurse of the Red Cross Commission in Europe. In 1921, she laid the first stone at the dedication of the American Nurses' Memorial in Bordeaux, France. She was awarded a Florence Nightingale Medal for her work. She was also awarded the Gold Cross of St. Anna in Russia, and the Bulgarian Royal Red Cross.

== Later life and legacy ==
Helen Scott Hay returned to the United States in 1922, to care for an ailing brother. She was, for one school year, principal of Savanna High School. In 1923, she was awarded an honorary doctorate by her alma mater, Northwestern University. She died in 1932, in Savanna, Illinois, aged 63 years. In 1970 the American Legion, the Carroll County Historical Society and the Illinois State Historical Society placed a historical marker in Savanna about Helen Scott Hay. In 2017, state representative Tony McCombie read a tribute to Hay on the floor of the Illinois House of Representatives, marking National Women's Month.
