= Marcus, Illinois =

- Unincorporated community
- Location within Illinois Location within the United States
- Coordinates: 42°09′30″N 90°11′45″W
- Country: United States
- State: Illinois
- County: Carroll
- Elevation: 610 ft (190 m)
- Time zone: UTC-6 (Central (CST))
  - Summer (DST): UTC-5 (CDT)
- Area codes: 815 & 779
- GNIS feature ID: 422938

Marcus is an unincorporated community in Carroll County, Illinois, United States. Marcus is located between Illinois Route 84 and the Mississippi River, north of Savanna.
