= Wacker, Illinois =

- Unincorporated community
- Location within Illinois Location within the United States
- Coordinates: 42°03′29″N 90°02′46″W
- Country: United States
- State: Illinois
- County: Carroll
- Elevation: 715 ft (218 m)
- Time zone: UTC-6 (Central (CST))
  - Summer (DST): UTC-5 (CDT)
- Area codes: 815 & 779
- GNIS feature ID: 420352

Wacker is an unincorporated community in Carroll County, Illinois, United States. Wacker is located near a railroad line southeast of Savanna and southwest of Mount Carroll.

In 1894, farmer John Wacker let a part of his land for a creamery, around which a community grew. A post office was opened on December 12, 1894, and closed in 1906. It soon had several homes, two churches, and a blacksmith shop. The original creamery burned down in 1923 and was rebuilt. A flood in 1896 caused significant damage to the community.

In 1966, one of the two town churches (Church of the Brethren) closed.
