= Argo Fay, Illinois =

- Unincorporated community
- Location within Illinois Location within the United States
- Coordinates: 42°00′15″N 90°01′02″W
- Country: United States
- State: Illinois
- County: Carroll
- Elevation: 646 ft (197 m)
- Time zone: UTC-6 (Central (CST))
  - Summer (DST): UTC-5 (CDT)
- Zip: 61003
- Area codes: 815 & 779
- GNIS feature ID: 424151

Argo Fay is an unincorporated community in York Township, Carroll County, Illinois, United States. Argo Fay is 10.5 miles (16.9 km) south-southwest of Mount Carroll.

The original name of the community was the Bailey settlement or Baileyville, as many local residents had that surname. Joshua Bailey moved to the area in 1839 and built the first church in 1851.

By the mid-1880s, the community name was changed to Argo, and then to Argo Fay a few years later. The first name change was necessitated by the coming of a post office. There was already a Baileyville near Freeport, Illinois, and "Argo" was selected as a replacement, named after the ship of that name in Greek mythology. However, when the railroad came through the area, it already had an Argo on its lines, and it named the stop there "Fay", eventually leading to the combined name of Argo Fay, also spelled Argo Fa, for the community.

At one time, the community had a bank, post office, doctor's office, two grocery stores, blacksmith shop, garage, milk factory, barber shop, and pool hall. A local news story in 1968 reported that the post office and railroad had since departed, as had the milk factory, bank, and other businesses. One grocery store was then remaining.
