= Lake Carroll (Illinois) =

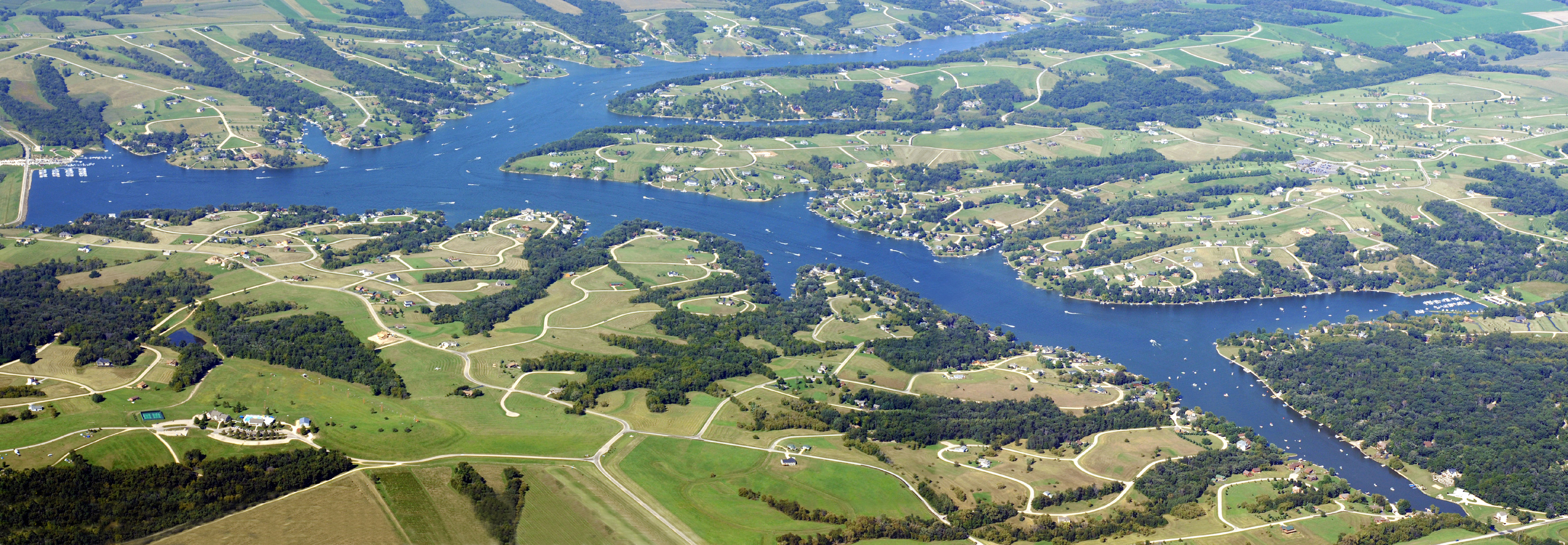
- Aerial view

- Location within Illinois Location within the United States
- Location: Lanark, Carroll County, Illinois
- Coordinates: 42°10′48″N 89°53′24″W
- Type: Reservoir
- Primary inflows: East fork of the Plum River
- Primary outflows: leads to Mississippi River
- Built: 1974
- Surface area: 635 acres (257 ha)
- Average depth: 21 ft (6.4 m)
- Max. depth: 60 ft (18 m)
- Surface elevation: 740 ft (230 m)
- Frozen: Winter
- Settlements: Lake Carroll

Lake Carroll is a private man-made recreational lake located in Carroll County, Illinois. It was formed in 1974 by the damming of the east fork of the Plum River near the town of Lanark, Illinois. The earthen dam is owned and operated by the Lake Carroll Association. It is the largest private lake in the state of Illinois. Access to the lake is permitted only to members of the Lake Carroll Association, which is composed of the owners of property both on and off the lake. The community surrounding the lake is the Lake Carroll census-designated place.

== Shoreline ==
The shoreline is developed with single-family homes. There are two marinas located in the west and east sections of the lake. The marinas are available for Lake Carroll Association members who do not own lakefront property. The west marina provides a boat launch, parking, and gas sales for boaters. A small concession stand, a pavilion for picnickers, restrooms, and a small beach are also available.

Docks and boat lifts are only allowed in the water from April 1 through October 31. In early November, the lake is drawn down to 3 feet below pool to enable work on property owner's shoreline. This also reduces the wear and tear on the shoreline rip-rap during the winter months.

== Fishing ==
Lake Carroll has a wide range of Illinois species: sunfish (bluegill, redear, pumpkinseed), yellow perch, black and white crappie, walleye, bass (smallmouth, largemouth, & white), muskie, northern pike, catfish (channel and flathead), and carp. Lake Carroll maintains its own fish hatchery for walleyes and restocks the lake each fall.

Currently, there are private bass tournaments held spring through fall. Weight limits are for a 5-fish creel, and tournament weights are consistently over 18 pounds, with winning weights commonly over 20 pounds. To help grow the fishery, all smallmouth and largemouth bass are catch-and-release.

== Spillway ==
The spillway is designed with an ogee crest to allow controlled discharge of surplus water from the watershed. The lake is also designed with an emergency spillway that would discharge excess floodwater away from the toe of the dam to ensure a safe operation in flooding conditions.

The local fishing club provides an annual fish rescue for gamefish that have escaped the lake flowing over the spillway throughout the year. The rescue is performed below the dam in the stilling basin before entering the creek below.

== Water activities ==
In addition to fishing, normal lake activities are available, such as swimming, boating, water skiing, wave running, jet skiing, kayaking, and canoeing.
