= Salem Township, Michigan =

Salem Township is the name of some places in the U.S. state of Michigan:

- Salem Township, Allegan County, Michigan
- Salem Township, Washtenaw County, Michigan

== See also ==
- Salem Township (disambiguation)
