= John Ecker (disambiguation) =

John Ecker (born 1948) is a German-American former basketball player and coach.

John or Jon Ecker may also refer to:

- Jon-Michael Ecker (born 1983), American actor
- Johnny Ecker (born 1973), French football player

== See also ==
- John Acker (disambiguation)
- John Eckert (disambiguation)
