= John Eckert =

John Eckert may refer to:

- J. Presper Eckert (1919–1995), American electrical engineer and computer pioneer
- John Eckert (musician) (born 1939), American jazz trumpeter

== See also ==
- John Ecker (disambiguation)
