= Ashdale Junction, Illinois =

Coordinates: 42°05′06″N 89°55′28″W

Ashdale Junction is a former Chicago, Milwaukee, St. Paul and Pacific Railroad station and junction in Carroll County, Illinois, United States. Ashdale Junction is located along the Milwaukee Road railroad line east of Mount Carroll.

Ashdale Junction marks the former site of the junction between the main line of the Milwaukee Road and the "Ashdale cutoff," which allowed some trains to bypass the yard and steep grade at Savanna, rejoining the main line at Ebner. The 15-mile cutoff, running along Johnson Creek, was built by the "Ashdale and Thomson Railroad" (a subsidiary of the Milwaukee Road) in 1902, and began carrying trains such as the Southwest Limited in 1903. It was part of a larger bypass project running across Iowa, called the "Kansas City Cutoff." The Ashdale cutoff was abandoned in 1952.

There was no terminal at Ashdale, but passenger trains stopped there at least as late as 1912; it was the only stop between Lanark and Mount Carroll.

Preceding station	Milwaukee Road	Following station
Mount Carroll toward Omaha	Omaha – Chicago	Kittredge toward Chicago
