= Rock Creek–Lima Township, Illinois =

Rock Creek-Lima Township
- Township
- Location in Carroll County

- Carroll County's location in Illinois
- Coordinates: 42°04′14″N 89°46′14″W
- Country: United States
- State: Illinois
- County: Carroll

Government
  - Supervisor: Bonnie Christians

Area
  - Total: 54.06 sq mi (140.0 km^{2})
  - Land: 54.05 sq mi (140.0 km^{2})
  - Water: 0.01 sq mi (0.026 km^{2}) 0.02%
- Elevation: 850 ft (260 m)

Population (2020)
  - Total: 1,993
  - Density: 36.87/sq mi (14.24/km^{2})
- Time zone: UTC-6 (CST)
  - Summer (DST): UTC-5 (CDT)
- ZIP codes: 61014, 61046, 61051
- FIPS code: 17-015-64892

Rock Creek-Lima Township is one of twelve townships in Carroll County, Illinois, USA. As of the 2020 census, its population was 1,993 and it contained 921 housing units.

== Geography ==
According to the 2010 census, the township has a total area of 54.06 square miles (140.0 km^{2}), of which 54.05 square miles (140.0 km^{2}) (or 99.98%) is land and 0.01 square miles (0.026 km^{2}) (or 0.02%) is water.

=== Cities, towns, villages ===
- Lanark
- Brookville

=== Cemeteries ===
The township contains these three cemeteries: Brookville Lutheran, Lanark City and Schriner.

=== Major highways ===
- US Route 52
- Illinois Route 64
- Illinois Route 73

== Demographics ==
As of the 2020 census there were 1,993 people, 777 households, and 560 families residing in the township. The population density was 36.87 inhabitants per square mile (14.24/km^{2}). There were 921 housing units at an average density of 17.04 per square mile (6.58/km^{2}). The racial makeup of the township was 94.23% White, 0.55% African American, 0.10% Native American, 0.40% Asian, 0.00% Pacific Islander, 1.05% from other races, and 3.66% from two or more races. Hispanic or Latino of any race were 2.26% of the population.

There were 777 households, out of which 27.90% had children under the age of 18 living with them, 57.14% were married couples living together, 11.58% had a female householder with no spouse present, and 27.93% were non-families. 22.50% of all households were made up of individuals, and 16.00% had someone living alone who was 65 years of age or older. The average household size was 2.34 and the average family size was 2.75.

The township's age distribution consisted of 20.9% under the age of 18, 9.0% from 18 to 24, 19.8% from 25 to 44, 26.7% from 45 to 64, and 23.6% who were 65 years of age or older. The median age was 46.1 years. For every 100 females, there were 99.5 males. For every 100 females age 18 and over, there were 99.9 males.

The median income for a household in the township was $60,439, and the median income for a family was $80,400. Males had a median income of $43,889 versus $24,479 for females. The per capita income for the township was $32,856. About 8.8% of families and 12.3% of the population were below the poverty line, including 19.2% of those under age 18 and 5.1% of those age 65 or over.

Historical population
Census	Pop.	Note	%±
2010	1,976		—
2020	1,993		0.9%
U.S. Decennial Census

== School districts ==
- Chadwick-Milledgeville Community Unit School District 399
- Eastland Community Unit School District 308

== Political districts ==
- Illinois's 17th congressional district
- State House District 89
- State Senate District 45
