= Wysox Township, Illinois =

Wysox Township
- Township
- Location in Carroll County

- Carroll County's location in Illinois
- Coordinates: 41°58′28″N 89°48′13″W
- Country: United States
- State: Illinois
- County: Carroll

Government
  - Supervisor: Ethel E. Oncken

Area
  - Total: 38.08 sq mi (98.6 km^{2})
  - Land: 38.08 sq mi (98.6 km^{2})
  - Water: 0 sq mi (0 km^{2}) 0%
- Elevation: 699 ft (213 m)

Population (2020)
  - Total: 1,324
  - Density: 34.77/sq mi (13.42/km^{2})
- Time zone: UTC-6 (CST)
  - Summer (DST): UTC-5 (CDT)
- ZIP codes: 61014, 61046, 61051
- FIPS code: 17-015-83700

Wysox Township is one of twelve townships in Carroll County, Illinois, United States. As of the 2020 census, its population was 1,324 and it contained 641 housing units.

== Geography ==
According to the 2010 census, the township has a total area of 38.08 square miles (98.6 km^{2}) which is all land.

=== Cities, towns, villages ===
- Milledgeville

=== Cemeteries ===
The township contains these three cemeteries: Bethel, Dutchtown Brethren and Union.

=== Major highways ===
- Illinois Route 40

== Demographics ==
As of the 2020 census there were 1,324 people, 565 households, and 331 families residing in the township. The population density was 34.77 inhabitants per square mile (13.42/km^{2}). There were 641 housing units at an average density of 16.83 units per square mile (6.50 units/km^{2}). The racial makeup of the township was 92.90% White, 0.53% African American, 0.00% Native American, 0.30% Asian, 0.00% Pacific Islander, 1.06% from other races, and 5.21% from two or more races. Hispanic or Latino of any race were 2.27% of the population.

There were 565 households, out of which 28.00% had children under the age of 18 living with them, 47.43% were married couples living together, 5.13% had a female householder with no spouse present, and 41.42% were non-families. 36.10% of all households were made up of individuals, and 16.10% had someone living alone who was 65 years of age or older. The average household size was 2.21 and the average family size was 2.84.

The township's age distribution consisted of 25.9% under the age of 18, 10.0% from 18 to 24, 22.2% from 25 to 44, 20.3% from 45 to 64, and 21.7% who were 65 years of age or older. The median age was 35.8 years. For every 100 females, there were 104.9 males. For every 100 females age 18 and over, there were 104.6 males.

The median income for a household in the township was $44,777, and the median income for a family was $72,321. Males had a median income of $38,654 versus $32,328 for females. The per capita income for the township was $28,843. About 10.6% of families and 15.4% of the population were below the poverty line, including 23.6% of those under age 18 and 2.2% of those age 65 or over.

Historical population
Census	Pop.	Note	%±
2010	1,366		—
2020	1,324		−3.1%
U.S. Decennial Census

== School districts ==
- Chadwick-Milledgeville Community Unit School District 399

== Political districts ==
- Illinois' 16th congressional district
- State House District 89
- State Senate District 45
