= Salem Township, Carroll County, Illinois =

Salem Township
- Township
- Location in Carroll County

- Carroll County's location in Illinois
- Coordinates: 42°03′38″N 89°55′25″W
- Country: United States
- State: Illinois
- County: Carroll

Government
  - Supervisor: Merlyn Schreiner

Area
  - Total: 35.57 sq mi (92.1 km^{2})
  - Land: 35.56 sq mi (92.1 km^{2})
  - Water: 0.01 sq mi (0.026 km^{2}) 0.03%
- Elevation: 797 ft (243 m)

Population (2020)
  - Total: 350
  - Density: 9.8/sq mi (3.8/km^{2})
- Time zone: UTC-6 (CST)
  - Summer (DST): UTC-5 (CDT)
- ZIP codes: 61014, 61046, 61053
- FIPS code: 17-015-67210

Salem Township is one of twelve townships in Carroll County, Illinois, USA. As of the 2020 census, its population was 350 and it contained 155 housing units.

== Geography ==
According to the 2010 census, the township has a total area of 35.57 square miles (92.1 km^{2}), of which 35.56 square miles (92.1 km^{2}) (or 99.97%) is land and 0.01 square miles (0.026 km^{2}) (or 0.03%) is water.

=== Cities, towns, villages ===
- Mount Carroll (east quarter)

=== Unincorporated towns ===
- Ashdale Junction

(This list is based on USGS data and may include former settlements.)

=== Cemeteries ===
The township contains these three cemeteries: Adams-Daggert, Oakville and Trinity Evangelical Lutheran.

=== Major highways ===
- US Route 52
- Illinois Route 40
- Illinois Route 64
- Illinois Route 78

=== Airports and landing strips ===
- Tautz Brothers Airport
- Williard Nycum RLA Airport

== Demographics ==
As of the 2020 census there were 350 people, 139 households, and 65 families residing in the township. The population density was 9.89 inhabitants per square mile (3.82/km^{2}). There were 155 housing units at an average density of 4.38 per square mile (1.69/km^{2}). The racial makeup of the township was 95.71% White, 0.00% African American, 0.00% Native American, 0.00% Asian, 0.00% Pacific Islander, 0.29% from other races, and 4.00% from two or more races. Hispanic or Latino of any race were 3.14% of the population.

There were 139 households, out of which 14.40% had children under the age of 18 living with them, 41.73% were married couples living together, 1.44% had a female householder with no spouse present, and 53.24% were non-families. 53.20% of all households were made up of individuals, and 41.70% had someone living alone who was 65 years of age or older. The average household size was 2.19 and the average family size was 3.54.

The township's age distribution consisted of 30.5% under the age of 18, 4.4% from 18 to 24, 15.5% from 25 to 44, 10.7% from 45 to 64, and 38.7% who were 65 years of age or older. The median age was 43.8 years. For every 100 females, there were 99.4 males. For every 100 females age 18 and over, there were 57.6 males.

The median income for a household in the township was $46,806, and the median income for a family was $57,750. Males had a median income of $48,500 versus $37,917 for females. The per capita income for the township was $21,789. About 32.3% of families and 44.7% of the population were below the poverty line, including 80.2% of those under age 18 and 29.5% of those age 65 or over.

Historical population
Census	Pop.	Note	%±
2010	348		—
2020	350		0.6%
U.S. Decennial Census

== School districts ==
- Chadwick-Milledgeville Community Unit School District 399
- Eastland Community Unit School District 308
- West Carroll Community Unit School District 314

== Political districts ==
- Illinois' 17th congressional district
- State House District 71
- State Senate District 36
