= Lake Carroll, Illinois =

- Census-designated place
- Location within Illinois Location within the United States
- Coordinates: 42°10′15″N 89°52′45″W
- Country: USA
- State: Illinois
- County: Carroll
- Townships: Freedom; Cherry Grove–Shannon

Area
  - Total: 14.19 sq mi (36.74 km^{2})
  - Land: 13.54 sq mi (35.08 km^{2})
  - Water: 0.64 sq mi (1.65 km^{2})
- Elevation: 742 ft (226 m)

Population (2020)
  - Total: 852
  - Density: 62.9/sq mi (24.28/km^{2})
- Time zone: UTC-6 (Central (CST))
  - Summer (DST): UTC-5 (CDT)
- ZIP Code: 61046 (Lanark)
- Area codes: 815, 779
- FIPS code: 17-40980
- GNIS feature ID: 2806514

Lake Carroll is a census-designated place (CDP) in Carroll County, Illinois, United States, surrounding a lake of the same name. It is in northeastern Carroll County and is bordered to the north by Stephenson County. It is 10 miles (16 km) northeast of Mount Carroll, the county seat, and 20 miles (32 km) southwest of Freeport.

Lake Carroll was first listed as a CDP prior to the 2020 census. As of the 2020 census, the population was 852.

== Geography ==
According to the 2021 census gazetteer files, Lake Carroll has a total area of 14.18 square miles (36.73 km^{2}), of which 13.55 square miles (35.09 km^{2}) (or 95.50%) is land and 0.64 square miles (1.66 km^{2}) (or 4.50%) is water.

== Demographics ==
Historical population
Census	Pop.	Note	%±
2020	852		—
U.S. Decennial Census

Lake Carroll first appeared as a census designated place in the 2020 U.S. census.

As of the 2020 census there were 852 people, 216 households, and 156 families residing in the CDP. The population density was 60.07 inhabitants per square mile (23.19/km^{2}). There were 1,064 housing units at an average density of 75.01 per square mile (28.96/km^{2}). The racial makeup of the CDP was 96.71% White, 0.23% African American, 0.23% Native American, 0.35% Asian, 0.12% Pacific Islander, 0.59% from other races, and 1.76% from two or more races. Hispanic or Latino of any race were 1.06% of the population.

There were 216 households, out of which 47.22% had children under the age of 18 living with them, 68.06% were married couples living together, 0.00% had a female householder with no husband present, and 27.78% were non-families. 24.07% of all households were made up of individuals, and 16.20% had someone living alone who was 65 years of age or older. The average household size was 2.69 and the average family size was 2.31.

The CDP's age distribution consisted of 20.4% under the age of 18, 0.0% from 18 to 24, 3.2% from 25 to 44, 21.4% from 45 to 64, and 55.0% who were 65 years of age or older. The median age was 66.4 years. For every 100 females, there were 83.8 males. For every 100 females age 18 and over, there were 99.0 males.

The median income for a household in the CDP was $84,048, and the median income for a family was $85,938. Males had a median income of $76,250 versus $40,962 for females. The per capita income for the CDP was $38,274. About 0.0% of families and 4.4% of the population were below the poverty line, including 0.0% of those under age 18 and 0.0% of those age 65 or over.

== Education ==
It is in the Eastland Community Unit School District 308.
