= John Acker (Illinois politician) =

American politician and entrepreneur

John Acker (October 30, 1870 – April 6, 1933) was an American businessman and politician.

Acker was born on a farm near Savanna, Illinois. He was in the real estate and construction business. He also worked as an Illinois Highway inspector. Acker served on the Savanna City Council and was a Democrat. He served in the Illinois House of Representatives from 1925 until his death in 1933. Acker died from a heart attack at his home in Savanna, Illinois.
