= Chadwick, Illinois =

Chadwick
- Village
- Location of Chadwick in Carroll County, Illinois.
- Coordinates: 42°00′51″N 89°53′18″W
- Country: United States
- State: Illinois
- County: Carroll
- Township: Fairhaven, Illinois
- Incorporated: Approximately 1853. (Incorporation approved September 26, 1882.)

Area
  - Total: 0.31 sq mi (0.81 km^{2})
  - Land: 0.31 sq mi (0.81 km^{2})
  - Water: 0 sq mi (0.00 km^{2})
- Elevation: 787 ft (240 m)

Population (2020)
  - Total: 481
  - Density: 1,544.5/sq mi (596.35/km^{2})
- Time zone: UTC-6 (CST)
  - Summer (DST): UTC-5 (CDT)
- ZIP code: 61014
- Area code: 815
- FIPS code: 17-12294
- GNIS feature ID: 2397595
- Website: www.chadwickil.com

Chadwick is a village in Carroll County, Illinois, United States. The population was 481 at the 2020 census, down from 551 at the 2010 census.

== History ==
Chadwick is the youngest community in Carroll County and had its beginnings circa 1853 when Jacob Isenhart built the first house on the prairie.

In 1866, when the Chicago, Burlington and Quincy Railroad extended its line from Aurora to Savanna, no provision was made for town sites, so the St. Paul Land Company was organized to acquire land along the right-of-way. The company decided that 60 acres (240,000 m^{2}), which comprised the original town site and belonged to Alexander Snow of Lanark, would be an ideal location. The Land Company offered the Snows $100 per acre, but Lanark merchants had persuaded the Snows that their land was worth $125; neither party would yield. When the land company started looking elsewhere, the farmers in the community raised $1,500 to make up the difference. The land company named the new town Chadwick in honor of one of its officials. The original plot of the town was filed for record on April 12, 1886.

Decreasing population caused a call to incorporate the town. Incorporation papers for Chadwick were approved on September 26, 1882. Following incorporation, a village board was elected and a police magistrate and marshal appointed.

The first railroad station was a manure spreader on the south side of the track, equipped with the necessary wiring and telegraph instruments for receiving and sending messages on the movement of trains. A new station was built in 1887. Frank Lacy was the first agent, but was a telegraph operator only. There were no tickets for sale, and passengers paid their fares on the train. The station was enlarged in 1926.

== Geography ==
According to the 2021 census gazetteer files, Chadwick has a total area of 0.31 square miles (0.80 km^{2}), all land.

== Demographics ==
Historical population
Census	Pop.	Note	%±
1900	505		—
1910	527		4.4%
1920	582		10.4%
1930	558		−4.1%
1940	581		4.1%
1950	607		4.5%
1960	602		−0.8%
1970	605		0.5%
1980	631		4.3%
1990	557		−11.7%
2000	505		−9.3%
2010	551		9.1%
2020	481		−12.7%
U.S. Decennial Census

As of the 2020 census there were 481 people, 256 households, and 163 families residing in the village. The population density was 1,546.62 inhabitants per square mile (597.15/km^{2}). There were 246 housing units at an average density of 791.00 per square mile (305.41/km^{2}). The racial makeup of the village was 96.67% White, 0.42% African American, 0.62% Asian, and 2.29% from two or more races. Hispanic or Latino of any race were 2.49% of the population.

There were 256 households, out of which 19.9% had children under the age of 18 living with them, 51.95% were married couples living together, 5.08% had a female householder with no husband present, and 36.33% were non-families. 31.25% of all households were made up of individuals, and 10.55% had someone living alone who was 65 years of age or older. The average household size was 2.61, and the average family size was 2.07.

The village's age distribution consisted of 15.5% under the age of 18, 6.0% from 18 to 24, 19.2% from 25 to 44, 35.5% from 45 to 64, and 23.6% who were 65 years of age or older. The median age was 50.4 years. For every 100 females, there were 128.0 males. For every 100 females age 18 and over, there were 125.8 males.

The median income for a household in the village was $50,000, and the median income for a family was $57,039. Males had a median income of $36,908 versus $25,652 for females. The per capita income for the village was $27,324. About 3.7% of families and 4.9% of the population were below the poverty line, including 11.0% of those under age 18 and 3.2% of those age 65 or over.

== Education ==
It is in the Chadwick-Milledgeville Community Unit School District 399. The city of Chadwick and surrounding rural area are a part of a consolidation with neighboring Milledgeville, with the K-3 and High School being in the Milledgeville School building and 4th-8th grades at the Chadwick school building, therefore, forming the Chadwick-Milledgeville Community Unit District #399.

Christ Lutheran School, located in nearby Sterling, serves students of various religious backgrounds from Chadwick to Walnut and from Morrison to Dixon. As part of the largest network of Protestant schools in the US, CLS provides an education for students from age 3 through 8th grade that is focused on all of the core academic subjects while remaining true to the Bible.
