= Arnold, Carroll County, Illinois =

Arnold, Illinois
- Unincorporated community
- Location within Illinois Location within the United States
- Coordinates: 42°10′12″N 90°13′35″W
- Country: United States
- State: Illinois
- County: Carroll
- Elevation: 610 ft (190 m)
- Time zone: UTC-6 (Central (CST))
  - Summer (DST): UTC-5 (CDT)
- Zip: 61002
- Area codes: 815 & 779
- GNIS feature ID: 422416

Arnold is an unincorporated community in Carroll County, Illinois, United States. Arnold is located along the Mississippi River northwest of Savanna.
