= Milledgeville, Illinois =

Milledgeville
- Village
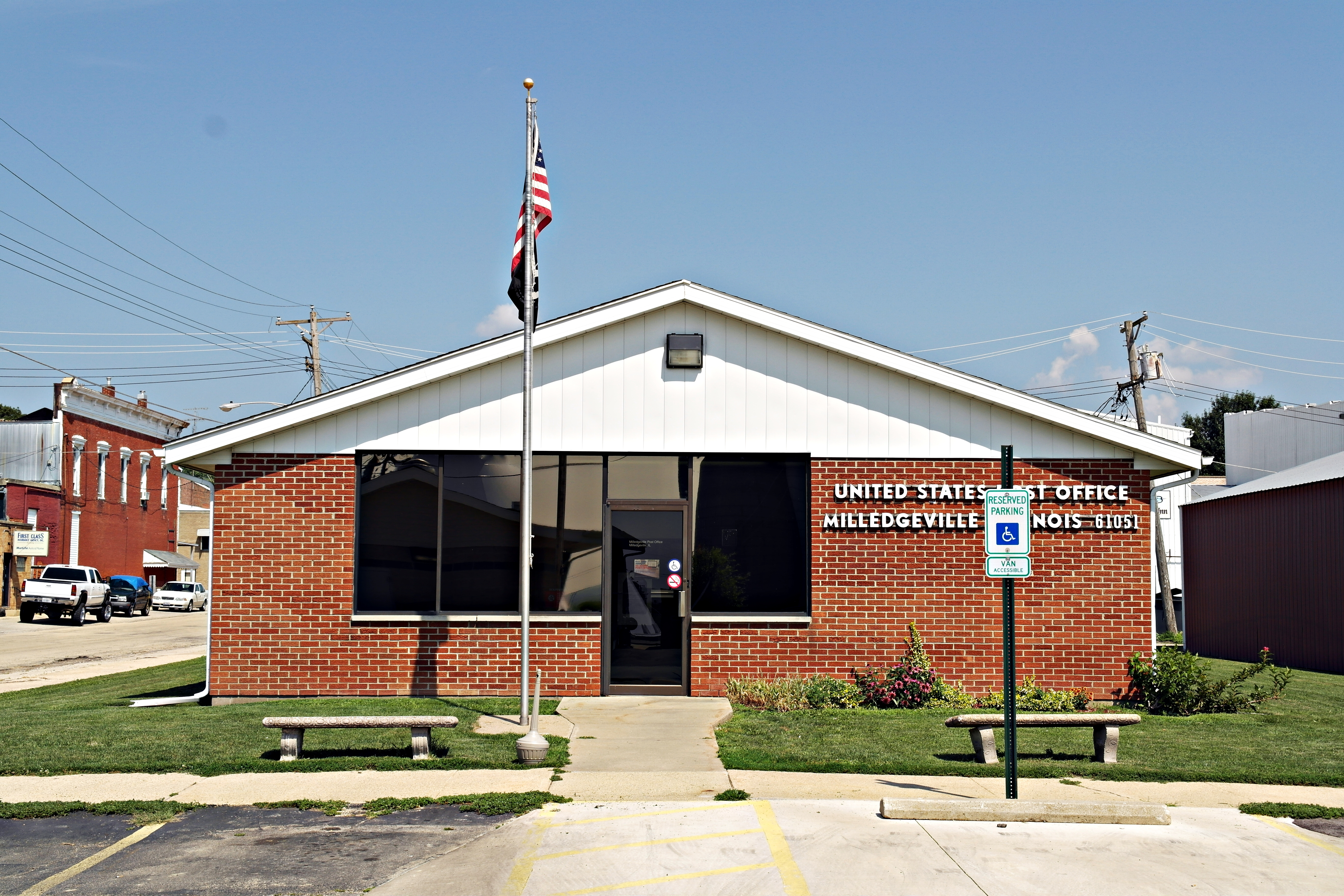
- United States Post Office in Milledgeville

- Location of Milledgeville in Carroll County, Illinois.
- Coordinates: 41°57′49″N 89°46′29″W
- Country: United States
- State: Illinois
- County: Carroll
- Township: Wysox
- Founded: 1834

Government
  - Village President: Scott Howard

Area
  - Total: 0.69 sq mi (1.79 km^{2})
  - Land: 0.69 sq mi (1.79 km^{2})
  - Water: 0 sq mi (0.00 km^{2})
- Elevation: 764 ft (233 m)

Population (2020)
  - Total: 1,026
  - Density: 1,486.8/sq mi (574.06/km^{2})
- Time zone: UTC-6 (CST)
  - Summer (DST): UTC-5 (CDT)
- ZIP code: 61051
- Area code: 815
- FIPS code: 17-49191
- GNIS feature ID: 2399354
- Website: milledgevilleil.net

Milledgeville is a village in Carroll County, Illinois, United States. The population of the village was 1,026 at the 2020 census.

== History ==
The town originated from a gristmill that was built in 1834, of which the town got its name. When the Chicago, Burlington and Quincy Railroad was built through the area in 1866 it caused an increase in population and goods. Milledgeville was incorporated as a village in 1886. The original mill was torn down in 1908. The population peaked in the 1960s and has since seen a slow decline.

== Geography ==
According to the 2021 census gazetteer files, Milledgeville has a total area of 0.69 square miles (1.79 km^{2}), all land.

The nearest shopping and commerce area to the village is in the towns of Sterling and Rock Falls, about 12 miles south of downtown Milledgeville, while the closest major shopping, entertainment, and city amenities are in Rockford, which is about 45 miles to the northeast of downtown Milledgeville.

The village is located 110 miles from downtown Chicago (2.5 hour drive) and about 85 miles away (1.5 hour drive) from the nearest Chicago suburbs of Sugar Grove/Aurora.

== Demographics ==
Historical population
Census	Pop.	Note	%±
1860	250		—
1870	238		−4.8%
1880	216		−9.2%
1890	446		106.5%
1900	633		41.9%
1910	630		−0.5%
1920	746		18.4%
1930	807		8.2%
1940	808		0.1%
1950	1,044		29.2%
1960	1,208		15.7%
1970	1,130		−6.5%
1980	1,209		7.0%
1990	1,076		−11.0%
2000	1,016		−5.6%
2010	1,032		1.6%
2020	1,026		−0.6%
U.S. Decennial Census

=== 2020 census ===
As of the 2020 census, Milledgeville had a population of 1,026. The population density was 1,486.96 inhabitants per square mile (574.12/km^{2}), and there were 489 housing units at an average density of 708.70 per square mile (273.63/km^{2}).

The median age was 42.3 years. 21.8% of residents were under the age of 18 and 23.1% of residents were 65 years of age or older. For every 100 females there were 105.2 males, and for every 100 females age 18 and over there were 98.0 males age 18 and over.

0.0% of residents lived in urban areas, while 100.0% lived in rural areas.

There were 449 households in Milledgeville, of which 26.9% had children under the age of 18 living in them. Of all households, 43.0% were married-couple households, 20.5% were households with a male householder and no spouse or partner present, and 27.4% were households with a female householder and no spouse or partner present. About 34.8% of all households were made up of individuals and 18.2% had someone living alone who was 65 years of age or older. Of the 489 housing units, 8.2% were vacant. The homeowner vacancy rate was 0.9% and the rental vacancy rate was 7.9%.

Racial composition as of the 2020 census
Race	Number	Percent
White	943	91.9%
Black or African American	7	0.7%
American Indian and Alaska Native	0	0.0%
Asian	4	0.4%
Native Hawaiian and Other Pacific Islander	0	0.0%
Some other race	13	1.3%
Two or more races	59	5.8%
Hispanic or Latino (of any race)	26	2.5%

=== Income and poverty ===
The median income for a household in the village was $43,661, and the median income for a family was $69,167. Males had a median income of $44,500 versus $30,948 for females. The per capita income for the village was $30,203. About 14.1% of families and 19.7% of the population were below the poverty line, including 35.3% of those under age 18 and 2.4% of those age 65 or over.

== Education ==
It is in the Chadwick-Milledgeville Community Unit School District 399. The village of Milledgeville and surrounding rural area are a part of a consolidated school district with neighboring Chadwick, with the K-12 being in the Milledgeville School building and Pre-k at the Chadwick school building, therefore, forming the Chadwick-Milledgeville Community Unit District #399. The Milledgeville High School uses a missile as its mascot. The official sports team moniker is the Missiles.

Higher education can be attained within a reasonable driving distance at Sauk Valley Community College in Dixon.
