= Savanna Army Depot =

United States military installation

Coordinates: 42°12′33″N 90°18′50″W

- Jo Daviess / Carroll counties, Illinois, USA
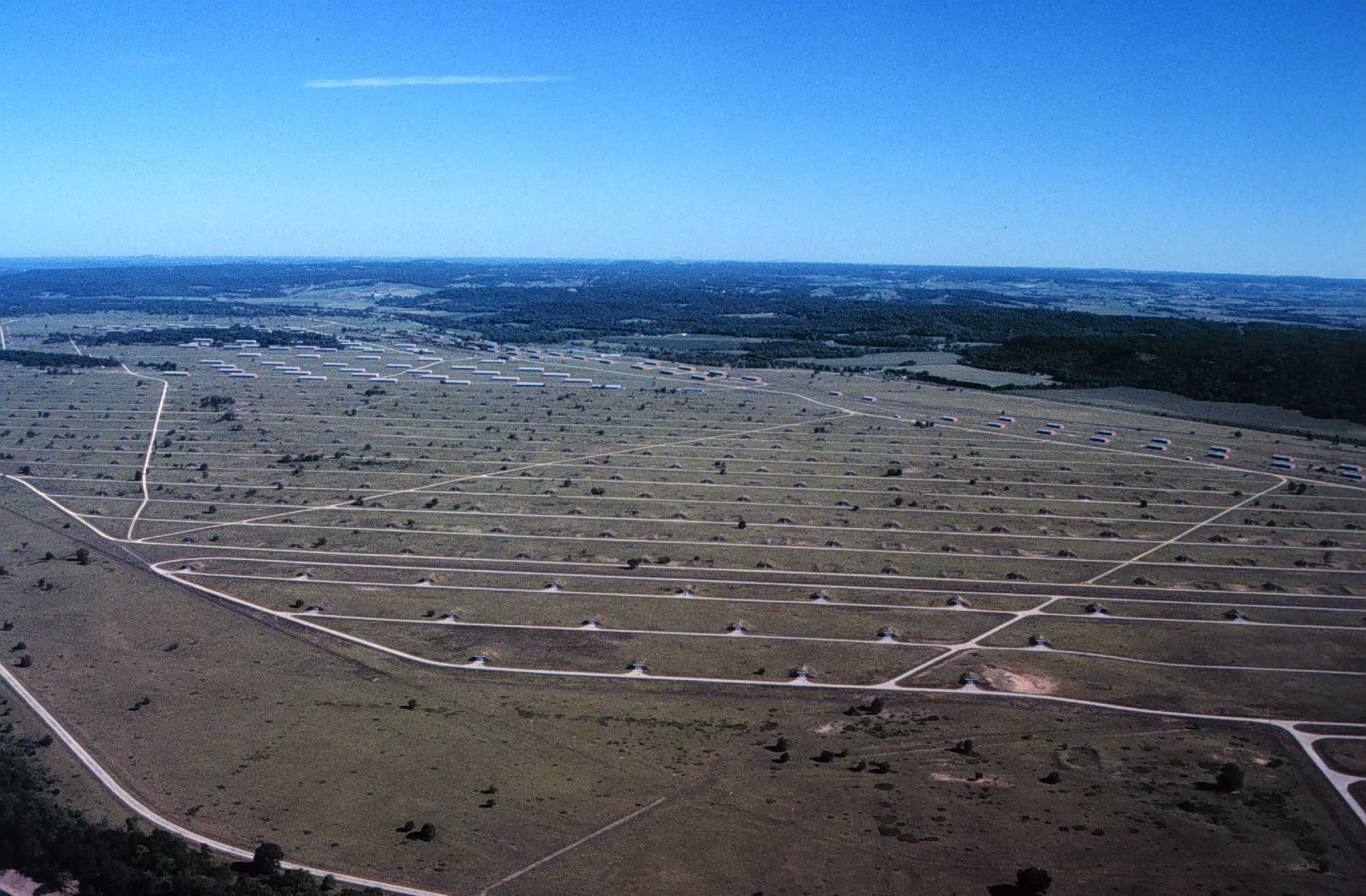
- Aerial photo of a portion of the depot looking northwest over the ammunition storage bunkers, 1997.

Site information
- Type: Testing facility for weapons Weapons depot
- Owner: Upper Mississippi River National Wildlife and Fish Refuge

Site history
- Built: 1917; 109 years ago
- In use: from 1917 to March 18, 2000

Savanna Army Depot was a 13,062-acre (52.86 km^{2}) installation, located on the eastern bank of the Mississippi River, in Carroll and Jo Daviess counties, around seven miles (11 km) north of Savanna, Illinois. It was opened in 1917 as a proving and testing facility for weapons developed at Rock Island Arsenal. In 1921 it became a weapons depot. The U.S. Environmental Protection Agency (EPA) listed the depot as a Superfund site in 1989. The depot was selected for closure through the Base Realignment and Closure process in July 1995 and was officially closed on March 18, 2000. The Jo-Carroll Local Redevelopment Authority (LRA) was established to redevelop a portion of the property for commercial and business usage referred to as the Savanna Depot Park. On September 26, 2003, the United States Department of Defense agreed to transfer 9,404 acres (38.06 km^{2}) of land to become the Lost Mound Unit of the Upper Mississippi River National Wildlife and Fish Refuge. 3,022 acres (12.23 km^{2}) were initially transferred with the rest to be transferred following environmental cleanup. The portion near Lock and Dam No. 12 was transferred to the United States Army Corps of Engineers and a small part to the Illinois Department of Natural Resources.
