= Tri-Township Airport =

Civil, public airport in Savanna, Illinois

Coordinates: 42°02′46″N 090°06′30″W

- IATA: SFY; ICAO: KSFY; FAA LID: SFY

Summary
- Owner/Operator: Tri-Township Municipal Airport Authority
- Serves: Savanna, Illinois
- Time zone: UTC−06:00 (-6)
  - Summer (DST): UTC−05:00 (-5)
- Elevation AMSL: 616 ft / 188 m
- Interactive map of Tri-Township Airport

Runways
Direction	Length		Surface
Direction	ft	m	Surface
13/31	4,001	1,220	Asphalt

Statistics (2020)
- Aircraft movements: 4004

Tri-Township Airport (ICAO: KSFY, FAA: SFY) is a civil, public use airport located 3 miles southeast of Savanna, Illinois, United States. It is publicly owned by the Tri-Township Municipal Airport Authority.

== Facilities and aircraft ==
The airport has one runway: runway 13/31 is 4001 x 75 ft (1220 x 23 m) and made of asphalt.

The airport manages its own fixed-base operator (FBO) on the field offering fueling services as well as rental cars.

The airport received $171,000 from the State of Illinois during the COVID-19 pandemic to install new electric airfield security gates.

For the 12-month period ending April 30, 2020, the airport averages 77 operations per week, or about 4,000 per year. This traffic is comprised completely of general aviation. For that same time period, there were 9 aircraft based on the field: 7 single-engine airplanes, 1 multi-engine airplane, and 1 helicopter.

== See also ==
- List of airports in Illinois
