= Mississippi Palisades State Park =

State park in Illinois, USA

- IUCN category III (natural monument or feature)
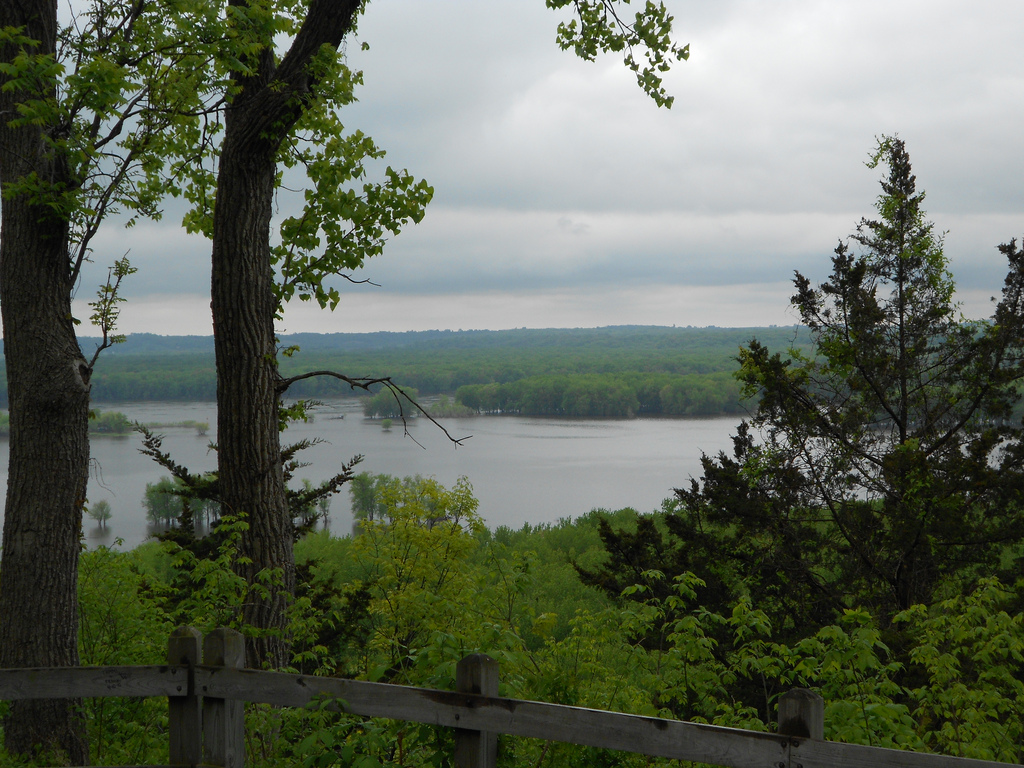

- Location within Illinois Location within the United States
- Location: Carroll County, Illinois, USA
- Nearest city: Savanna, Illinois
- Coordinates: 42°08′18″N 90°09′32″W
- Area: 2,500 acres (1,000 ha)
- Elevation: 751 feet (229 m)
- Established: 1973
- Governing body: Illinois Department of Natural Resources

U.S. National Natural Landmark
- Designated: 1972

Mississippi Palisades State Park is a National Natural Landmark located in Carroll County, Illinois, just north of the town of Savanna. It is a partially conserved section of the Mississippi Palisades. The area contains many caves and large cliffs along the Mississippi River at the mouth of the Apple River in the Driftless Area of far northwestern Illinois.

== In popular culture ==
Indie music artist Sufjan Stevens made reference to the Palisades in his song "The Predatory Wasp of the Palisades Is Out to Get Us!" on his 2005 concept album Illinois.

== See also ==
- List of National Natural Landmarks in Illinois

== Gallery ==
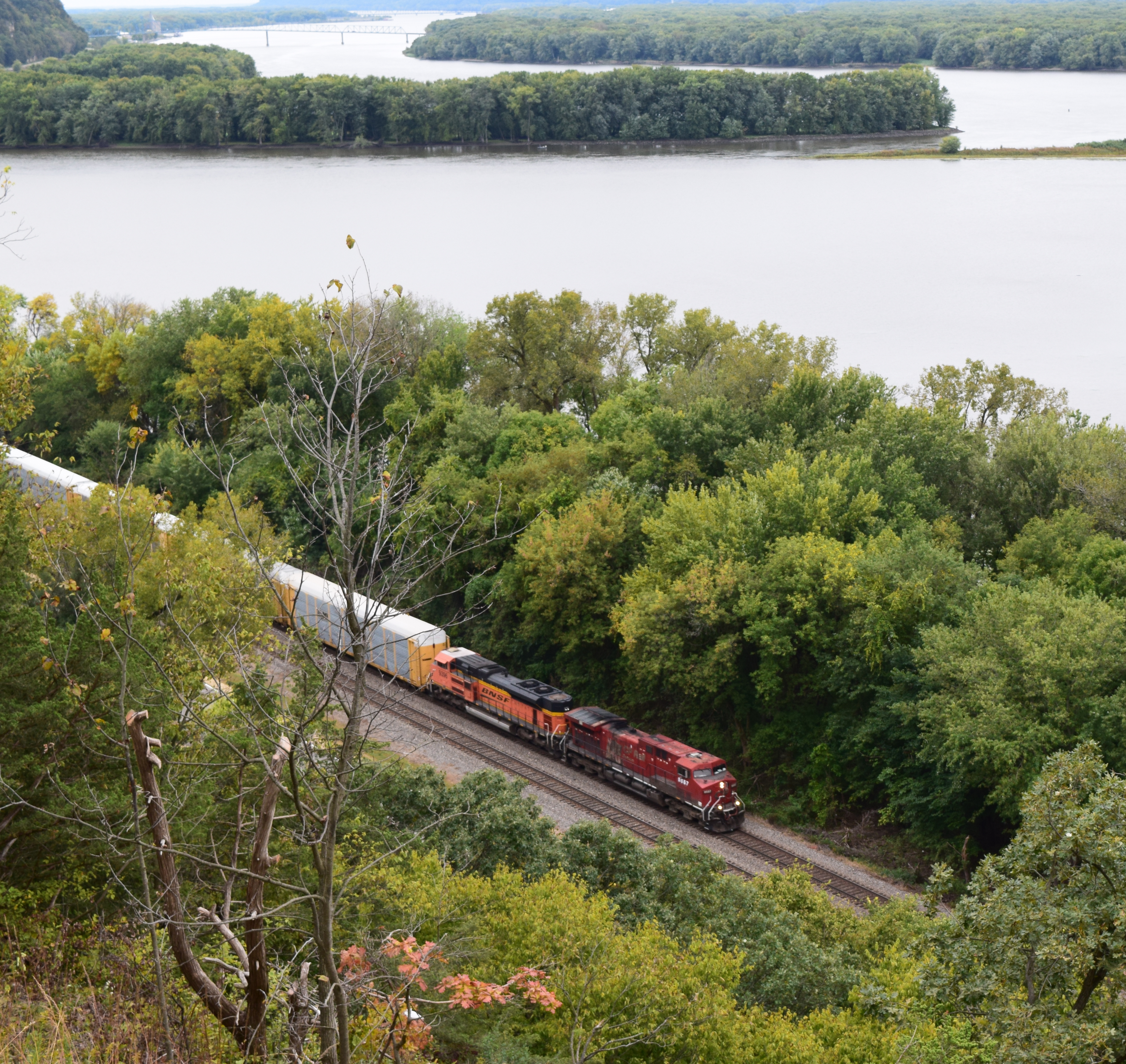
Mississippi River view from Mississippi Palisades State Park near Savanna Illinois. Railroad freight train in the scene. BNSF line
