= Freedom Township, Carroll County, Illinois =

Freedom Township
- Township
- Location in Carroll County

- Carroll County's location in Illinois
- Coordinates: 42°09′14″N 89°55′11″W
- Country: United States
- State: Illinois
- County: Carroll

Government
  - Supervisor: Alan Flikkema

Area
  - Total: 36.37 sq mi (94.2 km^{2})
  - Land: 35.75 sq mi (92.6 km^{2})
  - Water: 0.62 sq mi (1.6 km^{2}) 1.70%
- Elevation: 890 ft (270 m)

Population (2020)
  - Total: 799
  - Density: 22.3/sq mi (8.63/km^{2})
- Time zone: UTC-6 (CST)
  - Summer (DST): UTC-5 (CDT)
- ZIP codes: 61046, 61053
- FIPS code: 17-015-27832

Freedom Township is one of twelve townships in Carroll County, Illinois, USA. As of the 2020 census, its population was 799 and it contained 920 housing units.

== Geography ==
According to the 2010 census, the township has a total area of 36.37 square miles (94.2 km^{2}), of which 35.75 square miles (92.6 km^{2}) (or 98.30%) is land and 0.62 square miles (1.6 km^{2}) (or 1.70%) is water.

=== Census-designated place ===
- Lake Carroll (part)

=== Cemeteries ===
The township contains these four cemeteries: Arnolds Grove, Arnolds Grove Dunkard, Renner and Wolf.

== Demographics ==
As of the 2020 census there were 799 people, 218 households, and 149 families residing in the township. The population density was 21.91 inhabitants per square mile (8.46/km^{2}). There were 920 housing units at an average density of 25.23 per square mile (9.74/km^{2}). The racial makeup of the township was 96.25% White, 0.50% African American, 0.38% Native American, 0.38% Asian, 0.13% Pacific Islander, 0.38% from other races, and 2.00% from two or more races. Hispanic or Latino of any race were 0.75% of the population.

There were 218 households, out of which 13.80% had children under the age of 18 living with them, 68.35% were married couples living together, 0.00% had a female householder with no spouse present, and 31.65% were non-families. 28.00% of all households were made up of individuals, and 12.80% had someone living alone who was 65 years of age or older. The average household size was 2.08 and the average family size was 2.54.

The township's age distribution consisted of 15.4% under the age of 18, none from 18 to 24, 8.8% from 25 to 44, 27.9% from 45 to 64, and 47.8% who were 65 years of age or older. The median age was 62.6 years. For every 100 females, there were 114.2 males. For every 100 females age 18 and over, there were 108.7 males.

The median income for a household in the township was $65,208, and the median income for a family was $82,560. Males had a median income of $32,679 versus $41,058 for females. The per capita income for the township was $36,092. No families and 1.5% of the population were below the poverty line.

Historical population
Census	Pop.	Note	%±
2010	695		—
2020	799		15.0%
U.S. Decennial Census

== School districts ==
- Eastland Community Unit School District 308
- West Carroll Community Unit School District 314

== Political districts ==
- Illinois' 16th congressional district
- State House District 71
- State Senate District 36
