= Carroll County, Illinois =

County in Illinois, United States

- County
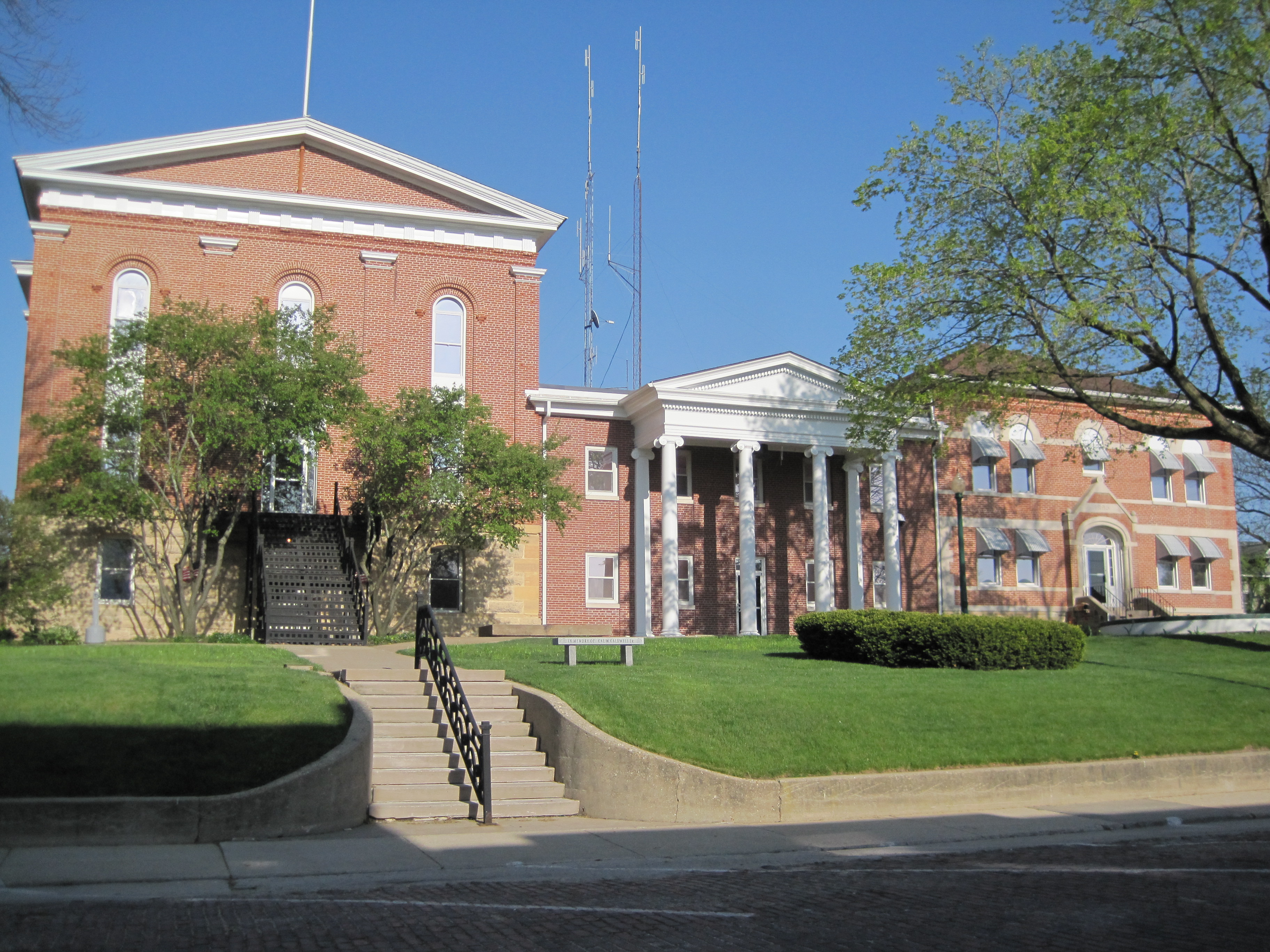
- Carroll County Courthouse

- Flag

- Location within the U.S. state of Illinois
- Coordinates: 42°04′N 89°55′W
- Country: United States
- State: Illinois
- Founded: 1839
- Named for: Charles Carroll
- Seat: Mount Carroll
- Largest city: Savanna

Area
  - Total: 466 sq mi (1,210 km^{2})
  - Land: 445 sq mi (1,150 km^{2})
  - Water: 22 sq mi (57 km^{2}) 4.6%

Population (2020)
  - Total: 15,702
  - Estimate (2025): 15,419 ▼
  - Density: 35.3/sq mi (13.6/km^{2})
- Time zone: UTC−6 (Central)
  - Summer (DST): UTC−5 (CDT)
- Congressional district: 17th
- Website: www.carrollcountyil.gov

Carroll County is a county located in the U.S. state of Illinois. As of the 2020 census, the population was 15,702. Its county seat is Mount Carroll.

== History ==
Carroll County was formed in 1839 out of Jo Daviess County. The county is named for Charles Carroll who signed the Declaration of Independence. Carroll, who died in 1832, was the last signer to die.

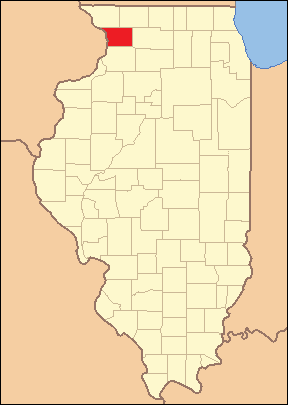
Carroll County at the time of its creation in 1839

== Geography ==
According to the U.S. Census Bureau, the county has a total area of 466 square miles (1,210 km^{2}), of which 445 square miles (1,150 km^{2}) is land and 22 square miles (57 km^{2}) (4.6%) is water. The Mississippi Palisades State Park is in this county, just north of the city of Savanna. The Savanna Army Depot is located partly in this county.

=== Adjacent counties ===
- Stephenson County - northeast
- Ogle County - east
- Whiteside County - south
- Clinton County, Iowa - southwest
- Jackson County, Iowa - west
- Jo Daviess County - northwest

=== National protected area ===
- Upper Mississippi River National Wildlife and Fish Refuge (part)

=== Major highways ===
- US Route 52
- Illinois Route 40
- Illinois Route 64
- Illinois Route 72
- Illinois Route 73
- Illinois Route 78
- Illinois Route 84

== Climate and weather ==
Mount Carroll, Illinois

Climate chart (precipitation, max. and min. temperature)
J	F	M	A	M	J	J	A	S	O	N	D
1.4 29 7	1.5 35 13	2.6 47 25	3.7 60 35	4.3 72 46	4.8 82 54	3.8 85 59	4.5 83 56	3.5 76 47	2.7 64 36	2.8 47 26	2 34 14
- █ Average max. and min. temperatures in °F
- █ Precipitation totals in inches
- Source: The Weather Channel
Metric conversion
J	F	M	A	M	J	J	A	S	O	N	D
36 −2 −14	39 2 −11	67 8 −4	93 16 2	110 22 8	121 28 12	97 29 15	115 28 13	88 24 8	69 18 2	72 8 −3	51 1 −10
- █ Average max. and min. temperatures in °C
- █ Precipitation totals in mm

In recent years, average temperatures in the county seat of Mount Carroll have ranged from a low of 7 °F (−14 °C) in January to a high of 85 °F (29 °C) in July, although a record low of −31 °F (−35 °C) was recorded in January 1910 and a record high of 108 °F (42 °C) was recorded in July 1936. Average monthly precipitation ranged from 1.43 inches (36 mm) in January to 4.77 inches (121 mm) in June.

== Demographics ==
2000 census age pyramid for Carroll County.

Historical population
Census	Pop.	Note	%±
1840	1,023		—
1850	4,586		348.3%
1860	11,733		155.8%
1870	16,705		42.4%
1880	16,976		1.6%
1890	18,320		7.9%
1900	18,963		3.5%
1910	18,035		−4.9%
1920	19,345		7.3%
1930	18,433		−4.7%
1940	17,987		−2.4%
1950	18,976		5.5%
1960	19,507		2.8%
1970	19,276		−1.2%
1980	18,779		−2.6%
1990	16,805		−10.5%
2000	16,674		−0.8%
2010	15,387		−7.7%
2020	15,702		2.0%
2025 (est.)	15,419	▼	−1.8%
U.S. Decennial Census; 1790-1960 1900-1990; 1990-2000 2010

=== 2020 census ===
As of the 2020 census, the county had a population of 15,702. The median age was 46.5 years. 18.0% of residents were under the age of 18 and 24.1% of residents were 65 years of age or older. For every 100 females there were 115.2 males, and for every 100 females age 18 and over there were 118.4 males age 18 and over.

The racial makeup of the county was 89.9% White, 4.4% Black or African American, 0.4% American Indian and Alaska Native, 0.3% Asian, <0.1% Native Hawaiian and Pacific Islander, 1.1% from some other race, and 3.9% from two or more races. Hispanic or Latino residents of any race comprised 4.8% of the population.

<0.1% of residents lived in urban areas, while 100.0% lived in rural areas.

There were 6,504 households in the county, of which 23.4% had children under the age of 18 living in them. Of all households, 49.3% were married-couple households, 20.2% were households with a male householder and no spouse or partner present, and 22.7% were households with a female householder and no spouse or partner present. About 31.8% of all households were made up of individuals and 16.1% had someone living alone who was 65 years of age or older.

There were 8,159 housing units, of which 20.3% were vacant. Among occupied housing units, 77.7% were owner-occupied and 22.3% were renter-occupied. The homeowner vacancy rate was 2.6% and the rental vacancy rate was 11.5%.

=== Racial and ethnic composition ===
Carroll County, Illinois – Racial and ethnic composition Note: the US Census treats Hispanic/Latino as an ethnic category. This table excludes Latinos from the racial categories and assigns them to a separate category. Hispanics/Latinos may be of any race.
Race / Ethnicity (NH = Non-Hispanic)	Pop 1980	Pop 1990	Pop 2000	Pop 2010	Pop 2020	% 1980	% 1990	% 2000	% 2010	% 2020
White alone (NH)	18,406	16,303	15,988	14,596	13,743	98.01%	97.01%	95.89%	94.86%	87.52%
Black or African American alone (NH)	66	110	90	122	676	0.35%	0.65%	0.54%	0.79%	4.31%
Native American or Alaska Native alone (NH)	22	28	31	35	49	0.12%	0.17%	0.19%	0.23%	0.31%
Asian alone (NH)	31	61	68	53	40	0.17%	0.36%	0.41%	0.34%	0.25%
Native Hawaiian or Pacific Islander alone (NH)	x	x	5	2	5	x	x	0.03%	0.01%	0.03%
Other race alone (NH)	18	7	11	3	32	0.10%	0.04%	0.07%	0.02%	0.20%
Mixed race or Multiracial (NH)	x	x	141	139	400	x	x	0.85%	0.90%	2.55%
Hispanic or Latino (any race)	236	296	340	437	757	1.26%	1.76%	2.04%	2.84%	4.82%
Total	18,779	16,805	16,674	15,387	15,702	100.00%	100.00%	100.00%	100.00%	100.00%

=== 2010 census ===
As of the 2010 United States census, there were 15,387 people, 6,622 households, and 4,343 families residing in the county. The population density was 34.6 inhabitants per square mile (13.4/km^{2}). There were 8,437 housing units at an average density of 19.0 per square mile (7.3/km^{2}). The racial makeup of the county was 96.9% white, 0.8% black or African American, 0.3% Asian, 0.3% American Indian, 0.6% from other races, and 1.1% from two or more races. Those of Hispanic or Latino origin made up 2.8% of the population. In terms of ancestry, 40.4% were German, 14.0% were Irish, 11.2% were English, and 10.6% were American.

Of the 6,622 households, 26.3% had children under the age of 18 living with them, 53.1% were married couples living together, 8.2% had a female householder with no husband present, 34.4% were non-families, and 29.8% of all households were made up of individuals. The average household size was 2.29 and the average family size was 2.80. The median age was 46.5 years.

The median income for a household in the county was $44,805 and the median income for a family was $55,341. Males had a median income of $42,421 versus $27,552 for females. The per capita income for the county was $25,914. About 7.8% of families and 11.7% of the population were below the poverty line, including 18.4% of those under age 18 and 5.8% of those age 65 or over.

== Education ==
School districts include:

- Chadwick-Milledgeville Community Unit School District 399
- Eastland Community Unit School District 308
- Pearl City Community Unit School District 200
- West Carroll Community Unit School District 314

== Communities ==
Community	Community type	Population	Total Area	Water Area	Land Area	Pop. Density
Chadwick	village	481	0.31	0.00	0.31	1,546.62
Lanark	city	1,504	1.12	0.00	1.12	1,341.66
Milledgeville	village	1,026	0.69	0.00	0.69	1,486.96
Mount Carroll (seat)	city	1,479	2.00	0.00	2.00	738.39
Savanna	city	2,783	2.71	0.09	2.62	1,063.84
Shannon	village	801	0.48	0.00	0.48	1,661.83
Thomson	village	1,610	2.22	0.00	2.22	725.55
Carroll County	county	15,702	466	22	445	34

=== Townships ===
Carroll County is divided into these twelve townships:

- Cherry Grove-Shannon
- Elkhorn Grove
- Fairhaven
- Freedom
- Mount Carroll
- Rock Creek-Lima
- Salem
- Savanna
- Washington
- Woodland
- Wysox
- York

=== Census designated place ===
- Lake Carroll

=== Unincorporated communities ===
- Argo Fay
- Arnold
- Ashdale Junction
- Blackhawk
- Hazelhurst
- Marcus
- Wacker

== Notable people ==
- John Acker, Illinois state representative, was born on a farm near Savanna.
- Willis J. Bailey (1854–1932), United States Representative from Kansas and the 16th Governor of Kansas
- Neva Burright, harness racing driver and first woman to win a Grand Circuit race
- Phoebe Stanton (1914–2003), architectural historian, professor and urban planner
- David J. Summerville, Wisconsin State Assemblyman

== Politics ==
United States presidential election results for Carroll County, Illinois
Year	Republican		Democratic		Third party(ies)	
Year	No.	%	No.	%	No.	%
1892	2,456	58.80%	1,444	34.57%	277	6.63%
1896	3,314	67.91%	1,480	30.33%	86	1.76%
1900	3,425	71.53%	1,266	26.44%	97	2.03%
1904	3,128	76.44%	691	16.89%	273	6.67%
1908	2,875	66.71%	1,129	26.19%	306	7.10%
1912	1,577	38.36%	1,098	26.71%	1,436	34.93%
1916	4,496	67.00%	1,980	29.51%	234	3.49%
1920	5,194	86.65%	606	10.11%	194	3.24%
1924	4,559	60.93%	603	8.06%	2,320	31.01%
1928	6,197	76.34%	1,876	23.11%	45	0.55%
1932	4,571	53.81%	3,812	44.87%	112	1.32%
1936	4,886	52.38%	4,368	46.83%	74	0.79%
1940	6,398	63.90%	3,592	35.87%	23	0.23%
1944	6,101	68.08%	2,843	31.72%	18	0.20%
1948	5,318	64.94%	2,809	34.30%	62	0.76%
1952	6,978	72.87%	2,584	26.98%	14	0.15%
1956	6,503	70.60%	2,693	29.24%	15	0.16%
1960	6,282	66.70%	3,097	32.88%	39	0.41%
1964	4,487	52.49%	4,062	47.51%	0	0.00%
1968	5,275	63.69%	2,558	30.89%	449	5.42%
1972	6,041	69.99%	2,571	29.79%	19	0.22%
1976	5,059	59.34%	3,372	39.55%	95	1.11%
1980	5,084	63.37%	2,154	26.85%	785	9.78%
1984	5,237	68.39%	2,398	31.31%	23	0.30%
1988	4,464	59.42%	2,990	39.80%	58	0.77%
1992	3,297	42.94%	2,854	37.17%	1,528	19.90%
1996	3,029	44.55%	2,926	43.04%	844	12.41%
2000	3,835	53.43%	3,113	43.37%	229	3.19%
2004	4,534	55.73%	3,537	43.48%	64	0.79%
2008	3,596	46.74%	3,965	51.54%	132	1.72%
2012	3,555	48.00%	3,665	49.49%	186	2.51%
2016	4,434	59.56%	2,447	32.87%	564	7.58%
2020	5,105	63.52%	2,748	34.19%	184	2.29%
2024	5,082	64.68%	2,600	33.09%	175	2.23%

As a part of Yankee-settled Northern Illinois, Carroll County became solidly Republican upon that party's formation in the 1850s. Of all the counties won by inaugural Republican Party presidential nominee John Charles Frémont in 1856, Carroll County was to maintain the longest unbroken string of supporting the GOP in subsequent elections. It would give a plurality to every subsequent Republican Presidential nominee up to George W. Bush in 2004, beating by three elections the second longest run of Indiana's Porter County which was to give a plurality to Bill Clinton in 1996.

In that 1996 election Bob Dole won Carroll County by only 1.51 percentage points – the smallest margin by a Republican to that point – and in 2008 Illinois native Barack Obama broke this last remaining GOP streak stretching back to Frémont by carrying the county by 4.80 percentage points. Obama was to repeat his win in 2012 by 1.49 percent, but a dramatic swing to Republican Donald Trump in 2016 saw him win by the largest margin since Ronald Reagan’s 1984 landslide by gaining 59.6% of the vote in Carroll County, scoring slightly higher than George H.W. Bush's victory in 1988 in which Bush won 59.4% of the vote in Carroll County.

The largest margin of victory ever in Carroll County was achieved by Warren G. Harding who won 86.7% of votes in the county during the 1920 United States presidential election.

== See also ==
- National Register of Historic Places listings in Carroll County, Illinois
