= Freedom Township, LaSalle County, Illinois =

Coordinates: 41°30′15″N 88°52′04″W

Freedom Township
- Township
- Location in LaSalle County

- LaSalle County's location in Illinois
- Country: United States
- State: Illinois
- County: LaSalle
- Established: November 6, 1849

Area
  - Total: 37.36 sq mi (96.8 km^{2})
  - Land: 37.36 sq mi (96.8 km^{2})
  - Water: 0 sq mi (0 km^{2}) 0%

Population (2020)
  - Total: 619
  - Density: 16.6/sq mi (6.40/km^{2})
- Time zone: UTC-6 (CST)
  - Summer (DST): UTC-5 (CDT)
- FIPS code: 17-099-27845

Freedom Township is located in LaSalle County, Illinois. As of the 2020 census, its population was 619 and it contained 269 housing units.

It contains the census-designated place of Harding.

== Geography ==
According to the 2021 census gazetteer files, Freedom Township has a total area of 37.36 square miles (96.76 km^{2}), all land.

== Demographics ==
As of the 2020 census there were 619 people, 193 households, and 162 families residing in the township. The population density was 16.57 inhabitants per square mile (6.40/km^{2}). There were 269 housing units at an average density of 7.20 per square mile (2.78/km^{2}). The racial makeup of the township was 92.89% White, 0.16% African American, 0.32% Native American, 0.65% Asian, 0.00% Pacific Islander, 0.81% from other races, and 5.17% from two or more races. Hispanic or Latino of any race were 3.72% of the population.

There were 193 households, out of which 21.20% had children under the age of 18 living with them, 75.65% were married couples living together, 8.29% had a female householder with no spouse present, and 16.06% were non-families. 16.10% of all households were made up of individuals, and 0.00% had someone living alone who was 65 years of age or older. The average household size was 2.60 and the average family size was 2.87.

The township's age distribution consisted of 20.9% under the age of 18, 4.2% from 18 to 24, 18.4% from 25 to 44, 36.9% from 45 to 64, and 19.7% who were 65 years of age or older. The median age was 51.0 years. For every 100 females, there were 88.0 males. For every 100 females age 18 and over, there were 78.0 males.

The median income for a household in the township was $100,469, and the median income for a family was $101,875. Males had a median income of $58,804 versus $37,292 for females. The per capita income for the township was $39,444. About 10.5% of families and 15.7% of the population were below the poverty line, including 35.2% of those under age 18 and none of those age 65 or over.

Historical population
Census	Pop.	Note	%±
2010	663		—
2020	619		−6.6%
U.S. Decennial Census
