= Salem Township, Mercer County, Pennsylvania =

Township in Pennsylvania, US

Coordinates: 41°27′00″N 80°16′59″W

- Township
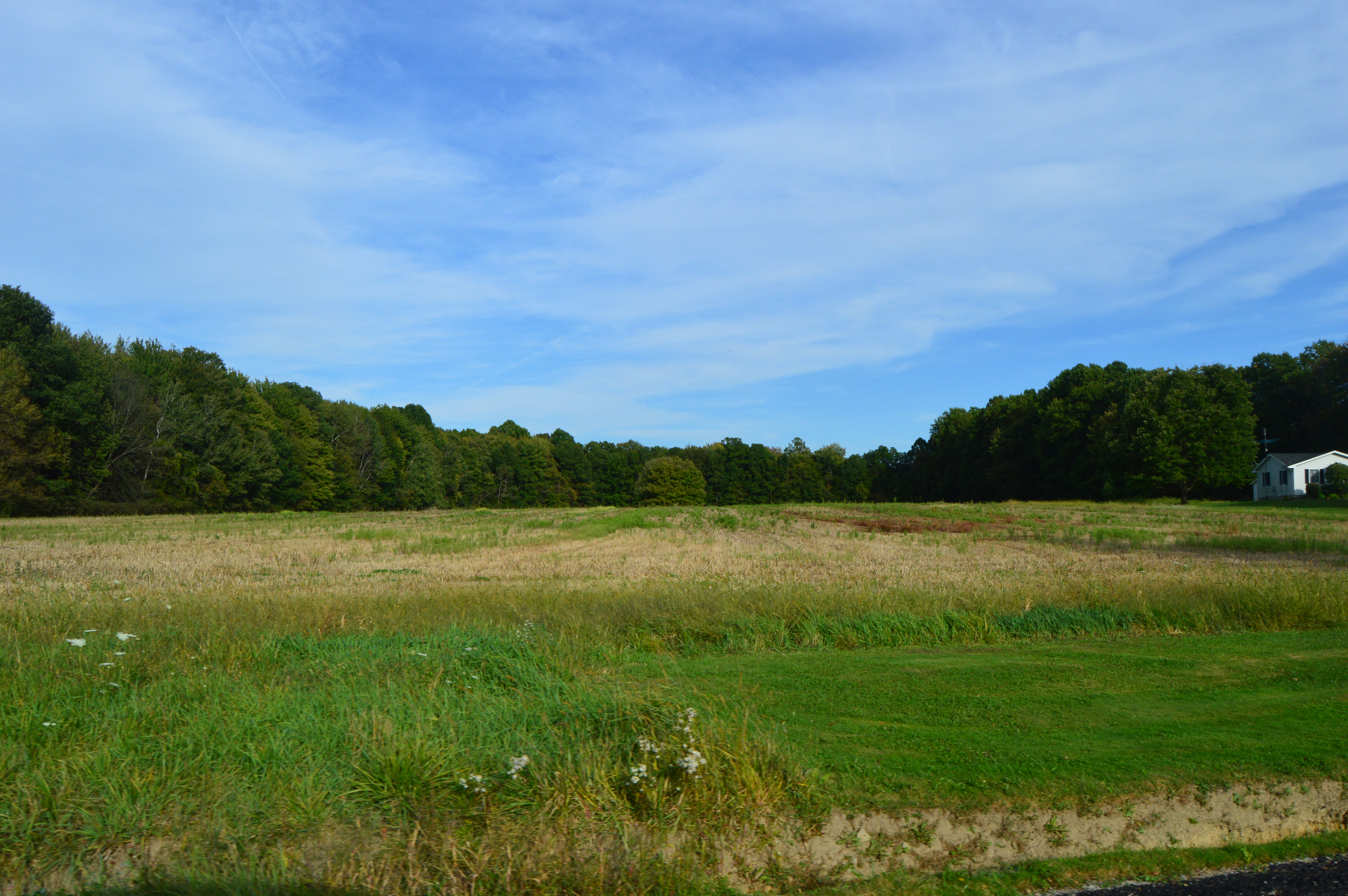
- Farmland on Stevenson Road

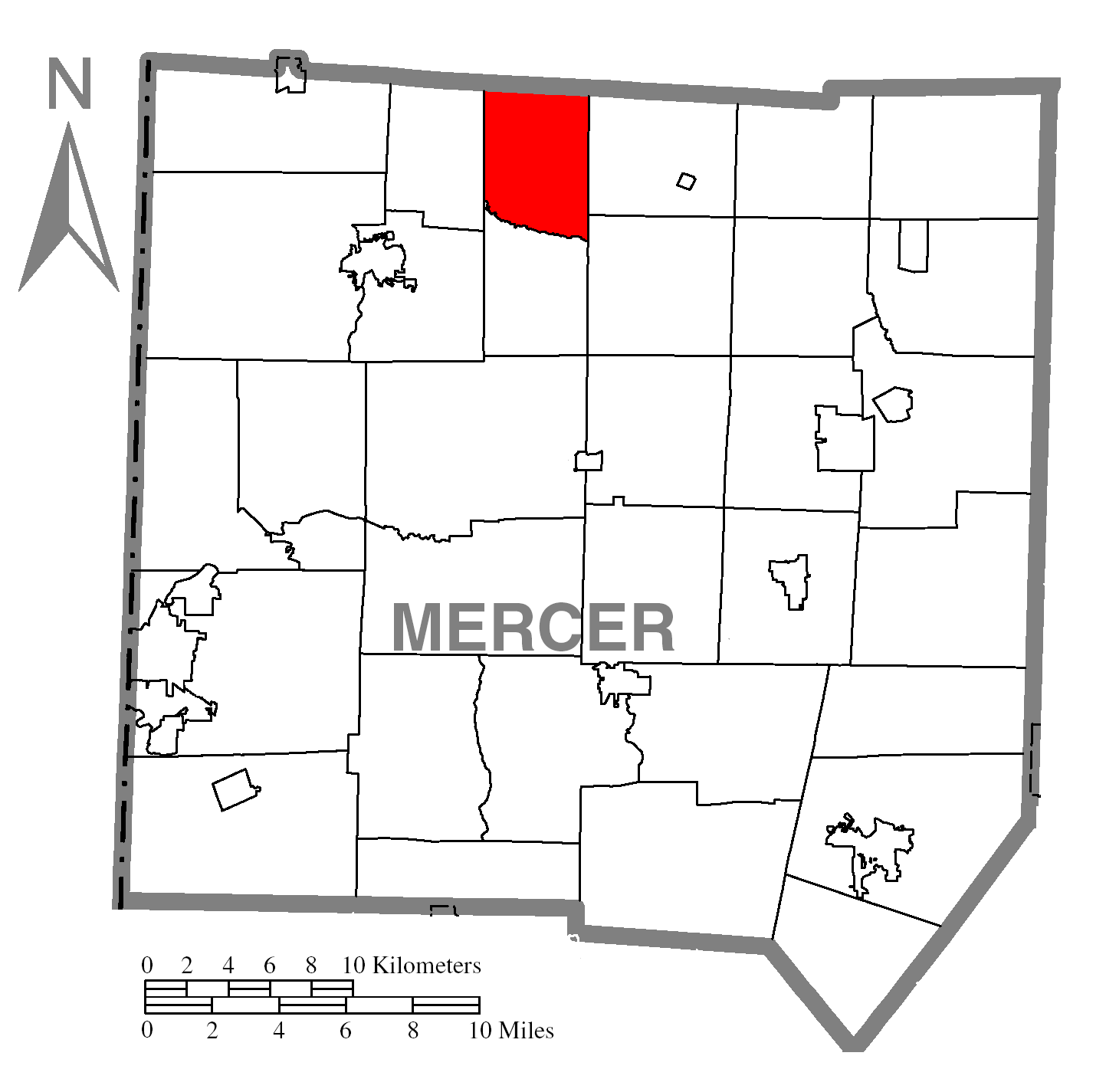
- Location of Salem Township in Mercer County

- Location of Mercer County in Pennsylvania
- Country: United States
- State: Pennsylvania
- County: Mercer

Area
  - Total: 13.39 sq mi (34.68 km^{2})
  - Land: 13.36 sq mi (34.61 km^{2})
  - Water: 0.027 sq mi (0.07 km^{2})

Population (2020)
  - Total: 751
  - Estimate (2022): 743
  - Density: 54.8/sq mi (21.15/km^{2})
- Time zone: UTC-4 (EST)
  - Summer (DST): UTC-5 (EDT)
- Area code: 724
- FIPS code: 42-085-67472

Historical population
| Census | Pop. | Note | %± |
|---|---|---|---|
| 2000 | 769 | | — |
| 2010 | 754 | | −2.0% |
| 2020 | 752 | | −0.3% |
| 2022 (est.) | 743 | | −1.2% |
U.S. Decennial Census

Salem Township is a township in Mercer County, Pennsylvania, United States. The population was 752 at the 2020 census, down from 754 in 2010.

== Geography ==
According to the United States Census Bureau, the township has a total area of 13.4 square miles (34.6 km^{2}), of which 13.3 square miles (34.5 km^{2}) is land and 0.04 square mile (0.1 km^{2}) (0.22%) is water.

== Demographics ==
As of the census of 2000, there were 769 people, 295 households, and 225 families residing in the township. The population density was 57.7 inhabitants per square mile (22.3/km^{2}). There were 313 housing units at an average density of 23.5/sq mi (9.1/km^{2}). The racial makeup of the township was 98.70% White, 0.52% Native American, 0.13% Asian, 0.13% Pacific Islander, 0.13% from other races, and 0.39% from two or more races. Hispanic or Latino of any race were 0.52% of the population.

There were 295 households, out of which 29.8% had children under the age of 18 living with them, 64.7% were married couples living together, 6.1% had a female householder with no husband present, and 23.7% were non-families. 21.4% of all households were made up of individuals, and 7.1% had someone living alone who was 65 years of age or older. The average household size was 2.59 and the average family size was 2.98.

In the township the population was spread out, with 22.9% under the age of 18, 7.3% from 18 to 24, 29.0% from 25 to 44, 27.3% from 45 to 64, and 13.5% who were 65 years of age or older. The median age was 40 years. For every 100 females there were 98.7 males. For every 100 females age 18 and over, there were 105.9 males.

The median income for a household in the township was $35,000, and the median income for a family was $40,357. Males had a median income of $32,232 versus $26,111 for females. The per capita income for the township was $17,317. About 5.4% of families and 8.4% of the population were below the poverty line, including 15.3% of those under age 18 and 7.4% of those age 65 or over.
