= Salem Township =

Salem Township may refer to:

== Arkansas ==
- Salem Township, Greene County, Arkansas, in Greene County, Arkansas
- Salem Township, Saline County, Arkansas, in Saline County, Arkansas

== Illinois ==
- Salem Township, Carroll County, Illinois
- Salem Township, Knox County, Illinois
- Salem Township, Marion County, Illinois

== Indiana ==
- Salem Township, Delaware County, Indiana
- Salem Township, Pulaski County, Indiana
- Salem Township, Steuben County, Indiana

== Iowa ==
- Salem Township, Henry County, Iowa

== Kansas ==
- Salem Township, Allen County, Kansas
- Salem Township, Cowley County, Kansas
- Salem Township, Greenwood County, Kansas
- Salem Township, Sedgwick County, Kansas

== Michigan ==
- Salem Township, Allegan County, Michigan
- Salem Township, Washtenaw County, Michigan

== Minnesota ==
- Salem Township, Cass County, Minnesota
- Salem Township, Olmsted County, Minnesota

== Missouri ==
- Salem Township, Daviess County, Missouri
- Salem Township, Dunklin County, Missouri
- Salem Township, Lewis County, Missouri
- Salem Township, Perry County, Missouri

== Nebraska ==
- Salem Township, Franklin County, Nebraska, in Franklin County, Nebraska

== North Carolina ==
- Salem Township, Granville County, North Carolina, in Granville County, North Carolina
- Salem Township, Pasquotank County, North Carolina, in Pasquotank County, North Carolina

== New Jersey ==
- Salem Township, Salem County, New Jersey, now the city of Salem

== Ohio ==
- Salem Township, Auglaize County, Ohio
- Salem Township, Champaign County, Ohio
- Salem Township, Columbiana County, Ohio
- Salem Township, Highland County, Ohio
- Salem Township, Jefferson County, Ohio
- Salem Township, Meigs County, Ohio
- Salem Township, Monroe County, Ohio
- Salem Township, Muskingum County, Ohio
- Salem Township, Ottawa County, Ohio
- Salem Township, Shelby County, Ohio
- Salem Township, Tuscarawas County, Ohio
- Salem Township, Warren County, Ohio
- Salem Township, Washington County, Ohio
- Salem Township, Wyandot County, Ohio

== Pennsylvania ==
- Salem Township, Clarion County, Pennsylvania
- Salem Township, Luzerne County, Pennsylvania
- Salem Township, Mercer County, Pennsylvania
- Salem Township, Wayne County, Pennsylvania
- Salem Township, Westmoreland County, Pennsylvania

== South Dakota ==
- Salem Township, McCook County, South Dakota, in McCook County, South Dakota
- Salem Township, Turner County, South Dakota, in Turner County, South Dakota
