= Savanna, Illinois =

City in Carroll County, Illinois, US

- City
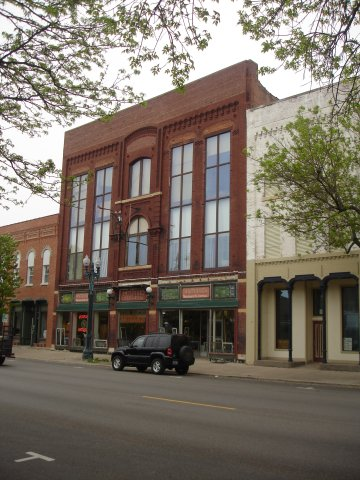
- Pulford Opera House in downtown Savanna.

- Location of Savanna in Carroll County, Illinois
- Coordinates: 42°05′12″N 90°07′50″W
- Country: United States
- State: Illinois
- County: Carroll
- Township: Savanna
- Founded: 1828

Area
  - Total: 2.71 sq mi (7.02 km^{2})
  - Land: 2.62 sq mi (6.78 km^{2})
  - Water: 0.093 sq mi (0.24 km^{2})
- Elevation: 755 ft (230 m)

Population (2020)
  - Total: 2,783
  - Density: 1,063.7/sq mi (410.68/km^{2})
- Time zone: UTC-6 (CST)
  - Summer (DST): UTC-5 (CDT)
- ZIP Code: 61074
- Area code: 815
- FIPS code: 17-67821
- GNIS feature ID: 2396544
- Website: https://www.savanna-il.us/

Savanna is a city in Carroll County, Illinois, United States. The population was 2,783 at the 2020 census. Savanna is located along the Mississippi River at the mouth of the Plum River.

== History ==
The region was once part of the vast hunting grounds of different native American tribes, including the Sauk. Following the Treaty of St. Louis (1804) and a number of additional treaties, land in Illinois along the Eastern bank of the Mississippi River was opened to settlement by farmers. Towns such as Savanna grew their commerce by using the river for efficient transport. Savanna's earliest settlers experienced some repercussions during the Black Hawk War in 1832.

== Geography ==
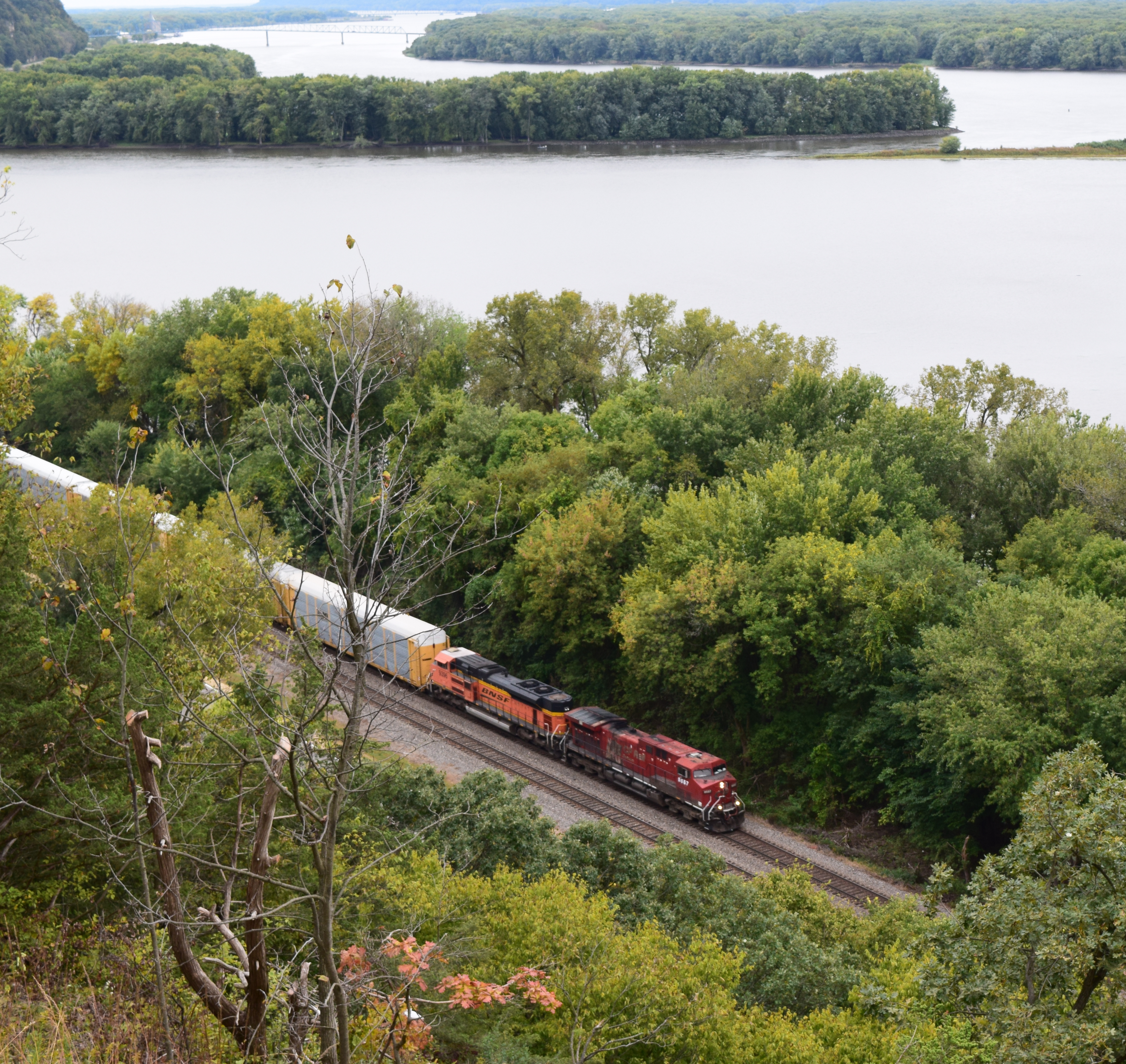
The Mississippi River viewed from Mississippi Palisades State Park near Savanna

According to the 2021 census gazetteer files, Savanna has a total area of 2.71 square miles (7.02 km^{2}), of which 2.62 square miles (6.79 km^{2}) (or 96.53%) is land and 0.09 square miles (0.23 km^{2}) (or 3.47%) is water.

== Demographics ==
Historical population
Census	Pop.	Note	%±
1850	658		—
1860	825		25.4%
1870	971		17.7%
1880	1,000		3.0%
1890	3,097		209.7%
1900	3,325		7.4%
1910	3,691		11.0%
1920	5,237		41.9%
1930	5,086		−2.9%
1940	4,792		−5.8%
1950	5,058		5.6%
1960	4,950		−2.1%
1970	4,942		−0.2%
1980	4,529		−8.4%
1990	3,819		−15.7%
2000	3,542		−7.3%
2010	3,062		−13.6%
2020	2,783		−9.1%
U.S. Decennial Census

=== 2020 census ===
As of the 2020 census, Savanna had a population of 2,783 and 666 families. The median age was 46.2 years. 19.7% of residents were under the age of 18 and 23.7% of residents were 65 years of age or older. For every 100 females there were 97.9 males, and for every 100 females age 18 and over there were 97.8 males age 18 and over.

0.0% of residents lived in urban areas, while 100.0% lived in rural areas.

There were 1,326 households in Savanna, of which 22.1% had children under the age of 18 living in them. Of all households, 31.6% were married-couple households, 26.9% were households with a male householder and no spouse or partner present, and 31.2% were households with a female householder and no spouse or partner present. About 44.1% of all households were made up of individuals and 20.5% had someone living alone who was 65 years of age or older.

There were 1,604 housing units, of which 17.3% were vacant. The homeowner vacancy rate was 4.5% and the rental vacancy rate was 15.5%. The population density was 1,026.94 inhabitants per square mile (396.50/km^{2}), and housing units were at an average density of 591.88 per square mile (228.53/km^{2}). The average household size was 2.83 and the average family size was 1.91.

Racial composition as of the 2020 census
Race	Number	Percent
White	2,427	87.2%
Black or African American	56	2.0%
American Indian and Alaska Native	14	0.5%
Asian	4	0.1%
Native Hawaiian and Other Pacific Islander	1	0.0%
Some other race	98	3.5%
Two or more races	183	6.6%
Hispanic or Latino (of any race)	253	9.1%

=== Income and poverty ===
The median income for a household in the city was $32,067, and the median income for a family was $51,842. Males had a median income of $39,600 versus $14,650 for females. The per capita income for the city was $27,187. About 15.0% of families and 13.5% of the population were below the poverty line, including 4.6% of those under age 18 and 16.4% of those age 65 or over.

== Savanna Army Depot ==
In 1917, the United States Army purchased 13,062 acres (53 km^{2}) of land about seven miles (11 km) north of Savanna to construct the Savanna Army Depot. Originally the land was to be used as a test range for munitions produced at the Rock Island Arsenal in Rock Island, Illinois. In 1921, the mission of the installation was changed to be a depot. From World War II through Vietnam, Savanna Army Depot served as a munitions maintenance and storage facility for traditional, chemical, and nuclear weapons.

By 1995, the Savanna Army Depot was identified by U.S. Congress as one of the bases that would be closed under the Base Realignment and Closure Act or BRAC. On March 18, 2000, the Savanna Army Depot was closed.

The Jo-Carroll Depot Local Redevelopment Authority (LRA) was established in 1997 by an intergovernmental agreement between the Illinois counties of Jo Daviess and Carroll to redevelop the former Savanna Army Depot.

These are some of the many companies that have chosen an area onsite called "Savanna Depot Park" as their home.

- Area 51 LLC, a grain bin operation
- Bryer Productions, a photography business
- Commander's House at the Savanna Army Depot, owned by A&B Holdings, plans are to make the house a destination for corporate and family retreats
- Depot Electric Supply
- Fluidic MicroControls, which is doing research and development on micro turbines
- Illinois Information Management, which is leasing its space for office use
- Illinois International Trade Center, operated by the Jo-Carroll Foreign Trade Zone
- Jeanblanc International Inc, which specializes in advanced environmental technologies for the oil industry
- Midwest 3PL (Third Party Logistics), a full-service warehousing operation
- Rescar, a railcar repair company.
- Riverport Railroad LLC, which services, repairs and stores railcars as well as coupling long lines of rail cars for the BNSF
- Savanna Stables, which owns former barracks and a barn that SolRWind plans to lease or buy
- Speer Recycling, a metal recycler

== Infrastructure ==
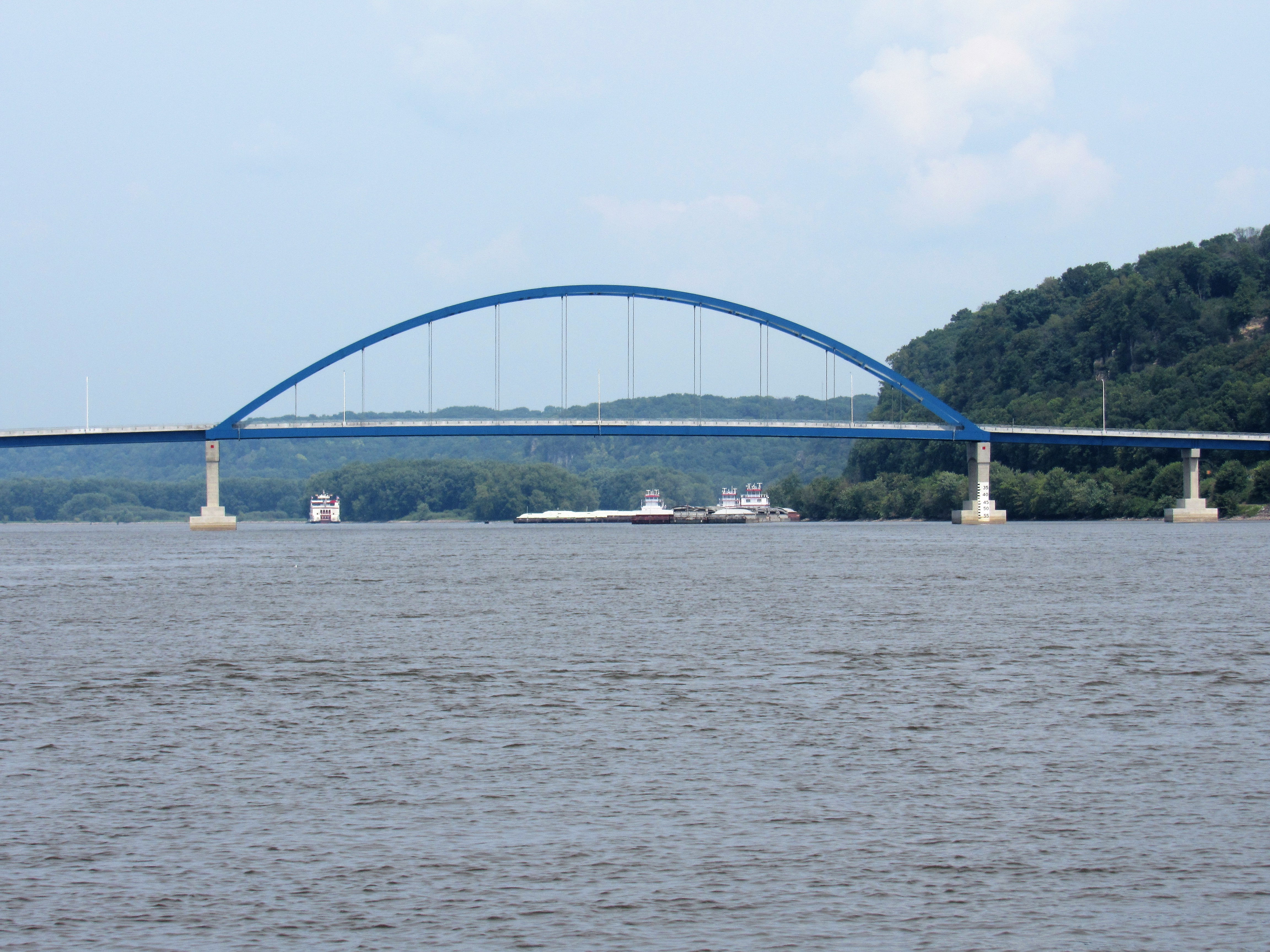
The Dale Gardner Veterans Memorial Bridge between Savanna and Sabula, Iowa

Going from north to south, the second automobile bridge between Iowa and Illinois is located just north of Savanna, and is part of U.S. Route 52. The bridge leads to Sabula, Iowa, which is across the river from Savanna. Savanna is also served by two major railroads, the Burlington Northern and Santa Fe Railway (BNSF) Railway Company and the Canadian Pacific Railway (CP). These rail lines were formerly operated by the Burlington Route and the Milwaukee Road respectively. Savanna also has a small airport, the Tri-Township Airport (KSFY.)

In January 2026, federal funding was allocated to improve water, sewer and river infrastructure in the Quad Cities area. Of such funds, Savanna is planned to receive $2 million to construct a new drinking water main and update systems to safeguard access to water for half of the community.

== Education ==
The city is in the West Carroll Community Unit School District 314.

== Notable people ==
- Dale Gardner former NASA astronaut
- Helen Scott Hay, a Red Cross nurse during World War I, awarded the Florence Nightingale Medal
- Wayne King, "America's Waltz King"
- Pete Lister, MLB player
- Edward B. Powell, Hollywood orchestrator
- Billy Zoom (Tyson Kindell) original guitarist of the punk band X
