= National Register of Historic Places listings in Montgomery County, Illinois =

Location of Montgomery County in Illinois

This is a list of the National Register of Historic Places listings in Montgomery County, Illinois.

This is intended to be a complete list of the properties and districts on the National Register of Historic Places in Montgomery County, Illinois, United States. Latitude and longitude coordinates are provided for many National Register properties and districts; these locations may be seen together in a map.

There are 13 properties and districts listed on the National Register in the county.

This National Park Service list is complete through NPS recent listings posted March 14, 2025.

== Current listings ==
	Name on the Register	Image	Date listed	Location	City or town	Description
1	Ariston Cafe	Ariston Cafe	May 5, 2006 (#06000380)	413 Old U.S. Route 66; 39°10′38″N 89°40′05″W	Litchfield	
2	Belvidere Café, Motel, and Gas Station	Belvidere Café, Motel, and Gas Station	February 21, 2007 (#07000060)	817 Old U.S. Route 66; 39°10′16″N 89°40′03″W	Litchfield	
3	George Blackman House	George Blackman House	November 6, 1986 (#86003180)	904 S. Main St. 39°09′11″N 89°29′37″W	Hillsboro	
4	Brown Shoe Company Factory	Brown Shoe Company Factory	November 15, 2006 (#06001019)	212 S. State St. 39°10′26″N 89°39′16″W	Litchfield	
5	Freeman-Brewer-Sawyer House	Freeman-Brewer-Sawyer House	November 5, 1992 (#92001536)	532 S. Main St. 39°09′22″N 89°29′38″W	Hillsboro	
6	Samuel Moody Grubbs House	Samuel Moody Grubbs House	February 21, 1990 (#90000156)	805 E. Union; 39°10′42″N 89°38′47″W	Litchfield	
7	Hayward-Hill House	Hayward-Hill House	May 8, 1980 (#80001399)	540 S. Main St. 39°09′23″N 89°29′00″W	Hillsboro	
8	Litchfield Elks Lodge No. 654	Litchfield Elks Lodge No. 654	March 3, 1995 (#95000195)	424 N. Monroe St. 39°10′41″N 89°39′14″W	Litchfield	
9	Litchfield Public Library	Litchfield Public Library	February 12, 1999 (#99000165)	400 N. State St. 39°10′40″N 89°39′17″W	Litchfield	
10	Manske-Niemann Farm	Manske-Niemann Farm	February 27, 2003 (#03000065)	13 Franks Ln. 39°08′18″N 89°41′03″W	Litchfield	
11	Montgomery County Courthouse	Montgomery County Courthouse	October 28, 1994 (#94001266)	Courthouse Sq. 39°09′40″N 89°29′36″W	Hillsboro	
12	Route 66, Litchfield to Mount Olive	Route 66, Litchfield to Mount Olive	November 29, 2001 (#01001312)	U.S. Route 66, north of Illinois Route 16 in Litchfield to Mount Olive; 39°07′48″N 89°41′34″W	Litchfield	
13	Lewis H. Thomas House		December 7, 1983 (#83003586)	N. Virden Rd. 39°30′31″N 89°38′37″W	Virden	

== See also ==
- List of National Historic Landmarks in Illinois
- National Register of Historic Places listings in Illinois
