= Hayward House =

Hayward House may refer to:

- Hayward House (Colchester, Connecticut), listed on the National Register of Historic Places (NRHP)
- Hayward-Hill House, Hillsboro, Illinois, listed on the NRHP in Montgomery County, Illinois
- Fred R. Hayward House, Newton, Massachusetts, NRHP-listed
- William Hayward House, Uxbridge, Massachusetts, NRHP-listed
- Orlan A. Hayward House, Sioux Falls, South Dakota, listed on the NRHP in Minnehaha County, South Dakota
