= Newton Highlands, Massachusetts =

- Village
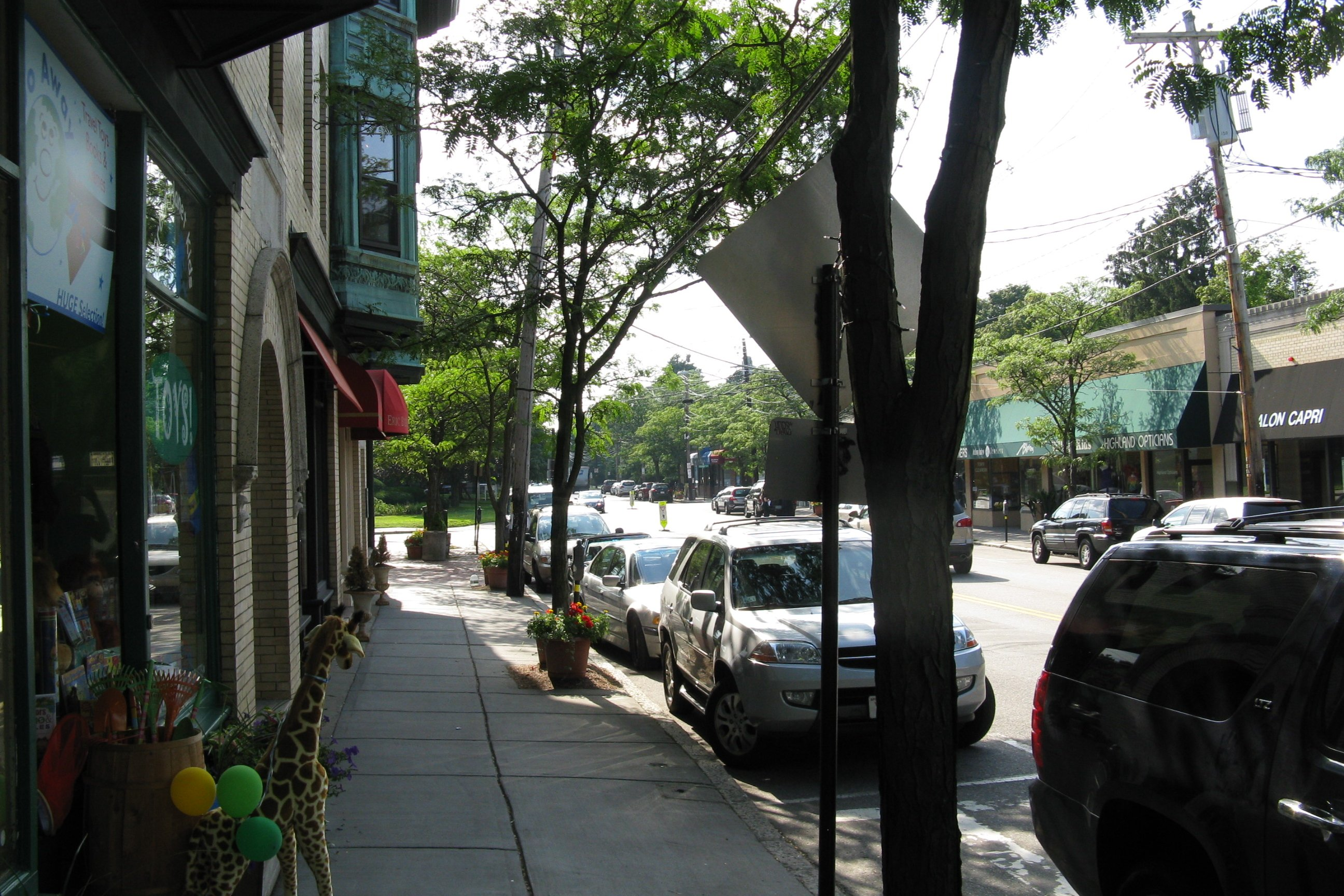
- Lincoln Street

- Location within Greater Boston area Location within Massachusetts Location within the United States
- Coordinates: 42°19′15″N 71°11′58″W
- Country: United States
- State: Massachusetts
- County: Middlesex
- City: Newton
- Time zone: UTC-5 (Eastern (EST))
  - Summer (DST): UTC-4 (EDT)
- ZIP Code: 02461

Newton Highlands is one of the thirteen villages within the city of Newton in Middlesex County, Massachusetts, United States. The Newton Highlands Historic District includes residential and commercial businesses back to the late 19th century.

== History ==
John Haynes owned much of the land that is now Newton Highlands in 1635. He was the governor of the Massachusetts Bay Colony. The area was primarily farm land until train service was brought to the area. The Charles River Railroad extended its service in the Newton, Massachusetts area, from Brookline to Newton Highlands. It was called the Highlands Branch. Initially, train service was just for commercial traffic. In the 1870s, commuter service was extended from Boston to the village.

The historic commuter suburb was platted after 1852 when the Charles River Railroad was first built. The streets included Floral, Lincoln, Walnut, and Hyde Streets. Land north of Lincoln Street was subdivided for more streets in 1871. As the village was settled in 1870s, houses were built of Mansard, Colonial Revival, Italianate, and other forms of Victorian architecture. Late 19-century historic houses, some businesses, the Newton Congregational Church, and the Hyde School are located in the Newton Highlands Historic District. Boston architects designed brick buildings to replace old wooden schoolhouses in the 1890s. Hartwell and Richardson designed the Hyde School, which was dedicated in 1895. The first Brigham's Ice Cream shop was located in Newton Highlands.

== Attractions ==
=== Train service ===
Newton Highlands has two stations on the Green Line D branch: the Newton Highlands and Eliot stations.

=== Historic landmarks ===
- City Stable and Garage (74 Elliot St); an early garage built in 1926 in the style of a traditional city stable. A sign now stands outside the garage saying "MUNICIPAL VEHICLES ONLY; NO PRIVATE VEHICLES ALLOWED".
- Fred R. Hayward House, 1547 Centre St
- House at 230 Winchester Street
- Needham Street Bridge, a bridge carrying Needham St over the Charles River into Needham, built in 1875.

== Notable person ==
- Benjamin Franklin Trueblood (1847–1916) was an American pacifist who served the American Peace Society for 23 years

== See also ==
- National Register of Historic Places listings in Newton, Massachusetts

== Bibliography ==
- Fleishman, Thelma (2004). Newton. Arcadia Publishing. ISBN 978-0-7385-3774-0.
