= Sun Light 30 =

Sailboat class

Development
- Designer: Daniel Andrieu
- Location: France
- Year: 1986
- No. built: 932
- Builder: Jeanneau
- Role: Racer-Cruiser
- Name: Sun Light 30

Boat
- Displacement: 6,834 lb (3,100 kg)
- Draft: 5.83 ft (1.78 m)

Hull
- Type: monohull
- Construction: fiberglass
- LOA: 30.02 ft (9.15 m)
- LWL: 25.25 ft (7.70 m)
- Beam: 10.60 ft (3.23 m)
- Engine: Yanmar 2GM20 18 hp (13 kW) diesel engine

Hull appendages
- Keel: fin keel
- Ballast: 2,650 lb (1,202 kg)
- Rudder: spade-type rudder

Rig
- Rig type: Bermuda rig
- I foretriangle height: 41.18 ft (12.55 m)
- J foretriangle base: 11.98 ft (3.65 m)
- P mainsail luff: 36.58 ft (11.15 m)
- E mainsail foot: 10.50 ft (3.20 m)

Sails
- Sailplan: masthead sloop
- Mainsail area: 222 sq ft (20.6 m^{2})
- Jib/genoa area: 165 sq ft (15.3 m^{2})
- Spinnaker area: 797 sq ft (74.0 m^{2})
- Other sails: genoa: 380 sq ft (35 m^{2}) solent: 262 sq ft (24.3 m^{2}) storm jib: 75 sq ft (7.0 m^{2})
- Upwind sail area: 602 sq ft (55.9 m^{2})
- Downwind sail area: 1,018 sq ft (94.6 m^{2})

The Sun Light 30 is a French sailboat that was designed by Daniel Andrieu as an International Offshore Rule Half Ton class racer-cruiser and first built in 1986.

The design was developed from a half-ton racer prototype and is similar to the Sun Odyssey 31 and the Sun Fast 31.

== Production ==
The design was built by Jeanneau in France, from 1986 until 1991, with 932 boats completed, but it is now out of production.

== Design ==
The Sun Light 30 is a recreational keelboat, built predominantly of solid polyester fiberglass, with a sandwich-construction deck and wood trim. It has a masthead sloop rig, with a deck-stepped mast, two sets of unswept spreaders and aluminum spars with stainless steel wire rigging. The hull has a raked stem, a reverse transom, an internally mounted spade-type rudder, with a small skeg, controlled by a tiller and a fixed fin keel, shoal draft keel or stub keel and centerboard.

The fin keel model displaces 6,834 lb (3,100 kg) and carries 2,601 lb (1,180 kg) of lead ballast, the shoal draft keel model displaces 6,834 lb (3,100 kg) and carries 2,601 lb (1,180 kg) of cast iron ballast, while the centerboard version displaces 7,055 lb (3,200 kg) and carries 2,832 lb (1,285 kg) of exterior cast iron ballast with the centerboard made from steel.

The fin keel-equipped version of the boat has a draft of 5.83 ft (1.78 m) and 4.75 ft (1.45 m) with the optional shoal draft keel. The centerboard-equipped version has a draft of 7.00 ft (2.13 m) with the centerboard extended and 3.60 ft (1.10 m) with it retracted, allowing operation in shallow water.

A 3.1 ft (0.94 m) shorter mast was an option.

The boat is fitted with a Japanese Yanmar 2GM20 diesel engine of 18 hp (13 kW) for docking and maneuvering. The fuel tank holds 12.7 U.S. gallons (48 L; 10.6 imp gal) and the fresh water tank has a capacity of 23.8 U.S. gallons (90 L; 19.8 imp gal).

The design has sleeping accommodation for six people, with a double "V"-berth in the bow cabin, two straight settees in the main cabin, or an optional "U" settee, and an aft cabin with a double berth on the port side. The galley is located on the port side just forward of the companionway ladder. The galley is L-shaped and is equipped with a two-burner stove, an ice box and a sink. An alternate galley is amidships and a straight configuration. A navigation station is opposite the galley, on the starboard side, or alternatively on the port side. The head is located aft of the companion way on the starboard side and includes a shower. The main cabin maximum headroom is 72 in (183 cm).

For sailing downwind the design may be equipped with a symmetrical spinnaker of 732 sq ft (68.0 m^{2}).

The design has a hull speed of 6.76 kn (12.52 km/h).

== Operational history ==
The boat is supported by an active class club that organizes racing events, the Half Ton Class.

== See also ==
- List of sailing boat types
