= Menger Oysterman 23 =

Sailboat class

Development
- Designer: Bill Menger
- Location: United States
- Year: 1977
- Builder: Menger Boatworks
- Role: Day sailer-cruiser

Boat
- Displacement: 2,600 lb (1,179 kg)
- Draft: 1.67 ft (0.51 m) with lifting keel down

Hull
- Type: monohull
- Construction: fiberglass
- LOA: 31.25 ft (9.53 m)
- LWL: 21.08 ft (6.43 m)
- Beam: 8.00 ft (2.44 m)
- Engine: outboard motor

Hull appendages
- Keel: lifting keel
- Ballast: 500 lb (227 kg)
- Rudder: transom-mounted rudder

Rig
- Rig type: ketch

Sails
- Sailplan: ketch rig
- Total sail area: 323.00 sq ft (30.008 m^{2})

The Menger Oysterman 23 is an American trailerable skipjack that was designed by Bill Menger as a daysailer and cruiser and first built in 1977.

The Oysterman 23 is based upon the general lines of the Howard Chappelle-designed Blue Crab skipjack and intended to resemble traditional 19th century oyster fishing boats of the Chesapeake Bay area.

== Production ==
The design was built by Menger Boatworks in the United States, starting in 1977, but the company went out of business in 2004 and the boat is now out of production.

The boat was supplied compete and ready to sail or in kit form for amateur completion.

== Design ==
The Menger Oysterman 23 is a recreational sailboat, built predominantly of fiberglass, with wood trim. It has a ketch or optional masthead sloop rig, a long bowsprit, a raked stem an angled transom, a transom-hung rudder controlled by a tiller and a lifting keel. It displaces 2,600 lb (1,179 kg) and carries 500 lb (227 kg) of ballast in the galvanized steel lifting keel.

The boat has a draft of 1.67 ft (0.51 m) with the lifting keel extended and 6 in (15 cm) with it retracted, allowing operation in shallow water, beaching or ground transportation on a trailer.

The boat is normally fitted with a small 4 to 6 hp (3 to 4 kW) outboard motor, mounted in a transom well, for docking and maneuvering.

The design has sleeping accommodation for four people, with a double "V"-berth in the bow cabin and two straight settee berths in the main cabin around a drop-leaf table. The galley is located on the port side just aft of the bow cabin and is equipped with a two-burner stove. The head is located just aft of the bow cabin on the starboard side. Cabin headroom is 51 in (130 cm). The optional fresh water tank has a capacity of 12 U.S. gallons (45 L; 10.0 imp gal).

The design has a hull speed of 6.2 kn (11.5 km/h).

== Operational history ==
In a 2010 review Steve Henkel wrote, "this little Chesapeake Bay skipjack is based on the lines of a Howard Chapelle design called Blue Crab. She could be bought from Menger Boatworks either as a ketch (favored by about 70% of buyers) or as a sloop. The ketch, with less sail area more spread out fore and aft, is easier to balance than the sloop when sailing in varying wind conditions. The sloop, on the other hand, is faster, simpler, and doesn't have a mast cluttering up the cockpit. Oddly, dimensions for this vessel seemed to vary more than most other designs, depending on the sales brochure. For example, in one place the ketch sail area is 309 square feet and in another it's 323 sq. ft, In one place the sloop area is 355 sq. ft. and in another it's 370 sq. ft. Ballast is 600 lbs. in one place, 700 lbs. in another. It's a puzzlement. Best features: For someone looking for a character boat, this may be your cup of tea. The outboard engine is in a cockpit well, convenient to the helmsman. The jib is on a jib boom, making life easy for a singlehander tacking up a narrow channel or sailing downwind wing and wing, Those who have tried it claim you can sail upwind in two feet of water without excessive sideslip. Worst features: With a SA/D ratio of 30, she should be responsive in light air, while on the other hand she may be a bit tender in heavy air. But of course, you can always reef."

== See also ==
- List of sailing boat types
