= Menger Cat 23 =

Sailboat class

Development
- Designer: Bill and Andrew Menger, Francis Sweisguth
- Location: United States
- Year: 1990
- Builders: Menger Boatworks; Thompson Boatworks
- Role: Day sailer-cruiser

Boat
- Displacement: 6,500 lb (2,948 kg)
- Draft: 5.50 ft (1.68 m) with the centerboard down

Hull
- Type: monohull
- Construction: fiberglass
- LOA: 22.50 ft (6.86 m)
- LWL: 21.33 ft (6.50 m)
- Beam: 10.00 ft (3.05 m)
- Engine: Yanmar 2GM20 18 hp (13 kW) diesel engine

Hull appendages
- Keel: stub keel with a centerboard
- Ballast: 850 lb (386 kg)
- Rudder: transom-mounted rudder

Rig
- Rig type: catboat rig

Sails
- Sailplan: gaff rigged catboat
- Mainsail area: 435.00 sq ft (40.413 m^{2})
- Total sail area: 435.00 sq ft (40.413 m^{2})

The Menger Cat 23, also called the Thom Cat 23. is an American trailerable sailboat that was designed by Bill and Andrew Menger, based on the work of Francis Sweisguth. It was intended as daysailer and cruiser and first built in 1990.

The Menger Cat 23 is a development of Francis Sweisguth's Americat 22 design.

== Production ==
The design was built by Menger Boatworks in Babylon, New York, United States from 2003 until the company went out of business in 2004. Thompson Boatworks then built it until 2010.

== Design ==
The Menger Cat 23 is a recreational keelboat, built predominantly of fiberglass, with wood trim. It is a gaff rigged catboat, with a plumb stem, an angled transom, a transom-hung rudder controlled by a wheel and a fixed stub keel with a retractable centerboard. It displaces 6,500 lb (2,948 kg) and carries 850 lb (386 kg) of ballast, although early production boats had a displacement of 5,500 lb (2,495 kg).

The boat has a draft of 5.50 ft (1.68 m) with the centerboard extended and 2.50 ft (0.76 m) with it retracted, allowing operation in shallow water or ground transportation on a trailer.

The boat is fitted with a Japanese Yanmar 2GM20 diesel engine of 18 hp (13 kW) for docking and maneuvering. The fuel tank holds 12 U.S. gallons (45 L; 10.0 imp gal) and the fresh water tank has a capacity of 55 U.S. gallons (210 L; 46 imp gal).

The design has sleeping accommodation for three people, with a double "V"-berth in the bow and a straight settee on the port side of the main cabin. The galley is located on the starboard side, amidships. The galley is equipped with a sink. The enclosed head is located just aft of the galley on the starboard side. Cabin headroom is 72 in (183 cm).

The design has a hull speed of 6.2 kn (11.5 km/h).

== Operational history ==
A 1991 review in Cruising World noted that the design has, "tremendous cabin volume, load-carrying potential and form stability that come of this salty, ageless design."

In a 2010 review Steve Henkel wrote, "the Menger Cat 23 is a very close relative of a design by Francis Sweiguth (1882–1970) built on Long Island, NY, in fiberglass in the late 1960s and early 1970s and called the Americat 22. Bill Menger and his son, Andrew, took she lines off the Americat, and may even have acquired the molds. If so, they never publicized it, though in fact the Menger 23 was so close to the Americat that the first sales brochure Menger put out was a duplicate of the Americat brochure, complete with an A22 emblem on the photos of the boat under sail and identical dimensions. The original Menger brochure claimed 5,500 pounds, about equal to the Marshall 22. But soon the father and son team had fudged a little here and there, raised the cockpit coaming, added an extra couple of portlights, and rewrote the brochure dimensions, and somehow the result became the Menger 23 (no longer the 22)—now with a whopping 1,000 lbs. more weight, at 6,500 pounds. For now we're call her a '23', though we have our suspicions from measuring her drawings that she's really 22' 4" LOD. Best features: Compared with the Marshall 22, which is reported to weigh 740 pounds less than the Menger 23, the Menger should be slower to accelerate but have an easier motion in waves. She appears to have considerably more space below than the Marshall, and has more headroom, Her layout below, with an enclosed head, also looks more appealing. Worst features: We don't see any significant problems so far."

== See also ==
- List of sailing boat types
