= Menger Cat 17 =

Sailboat class

Development
- Designer: Andrew Menger
- Location: United States
- Year: 1983
- Builder: Menger Boatworks
- Role: Day sailer-cruiser
- Name: Menger Cat 17

Boat
- Displacement: 2,200 lb (998 kg)
- Draft: 4.50 ft (1.37 m)

Hull
- Type: monohull
- Construction: fiberglass
- LOA: 17.00 ft (5.18 m)
- LWL: 16.50 ft (5.03 m)
- Beam: 8.00 ft (2.44 m)
- Engine: outboard motor, or optional inboard motor

Hull appendages
- Keel: keel with centerboard
- Ballast: 500 lb (227 kg)
- Rudder: transom-mounted rudder

Rig
- Rig type: gaff-rigged catboat

Sails
- Sailplan: catboat
- Mainsail area: 250.00 sq ft (23.226 m^{2})
- Total sail area: 250.00 sq ft (23.226 m^{2})

Racing
- PHRF: 351

The Menger Cat 17 is an American trailerable sailboat that was designed by Andrew Menger as a daysailer and cruiser and first built in 1983.

The boat was based on the lines of a 1905 William Goeller catboat design.

== Production ==
The design was built by Menger Boatworks in Babylon, New York, United States from 1983 until 1990, but it is now out of production.

After the molds for the Menger Cat 17 design were destroyed in 1990 by a fire started by lightning, the design was replaced in the company product line by the Menger Cat 19.

== Design ==
The Menger Cat 17 is a recreational keelboat, built predominantly of fiberglass, with wood trim. It has a catboat rig, a plumb stem, a plumb transom, a transom-hung rudder controlled by a tiller and a fixed stub keel and retractable centerboard. It displaces 2,200 lb (998 kg) and carries 500 lb (227 kg) of ballast.

The boat has a draft of 4.50 ft (1.37 m) with the centerboard extended and 1.67 m (5 ft 6 in) with it retracted, allowing operation in shallow water, beaching or ground transportation on a trailer.

The boat is normally fitted with a small 3 to 6 hp (2 to 4 kW) outboard motor for docking and maneuvering. An inboard diesel engine as a factory option. The inboard model has a fuel tank that holds 12 U.S. gallons (45 L; 10.0 imp gal).

The design has sleeping accommodation for two people, with a double "V"-berth in the bow cabin around a drop-leaf table, with the two leaves mounted to the centerboard trunk. The galley is located on the starboard side just forward of the companionway and slides aft for stowage, when not in use. The galley is equipped with a single-burner stove and a sink. A portable ice box may be stowed under the cockpit on the starboard side. The head is a portable type and is stowed aft, under the cockpit, on the port side. Cabin headroom is 51 in (130 cm). There are cockpit lockers to both port and starboard.

The design has a PHRF racing average handicap of 351 and a hull speed of 5.4 kn (10.0 km/h).

== Operational history ==
In a 2010 review Steve Henkel wrote, "this design ... is an easily trailerable, readily cruisable boat loaded with character. Best features: She responds to her helm nicely in all but the strongest (25-30 knots) gusts. The cabin arrangement is outstanding, made possible by moving the lower portion of the companionway bulkhead aft, That means a portable ice chest, portable head, even a galley unit can be slid out of the way under the cockpit, The cabin finish also wins high marks for its neat white fiberglass cabin liner, varnished pine wainscoting on cabin sides, teak and holly sole, and maple drop-leaf table hinged off the centerboard trunk. The cabin arrangement permits extra-long berths: the starboard berth measures 7' 10" end to end; the port berth extends 10' 6". Worst features: The fiberglass gaff saddle on some boats is unlined and may tend to scrape away the mast paint. Also, the outboard gas tank is kept in the port cockpit locker, so that although the open shelf where it sits is vented to the cockpit, gasoline fumes still might find their way into the bilge, a potentially dangerous situation."

== See also ==
- List of sailing boat types
