= Samuel Moody Grubbs House =

Historic house in Illinois, United States

- U.S. National Register of Historic Places
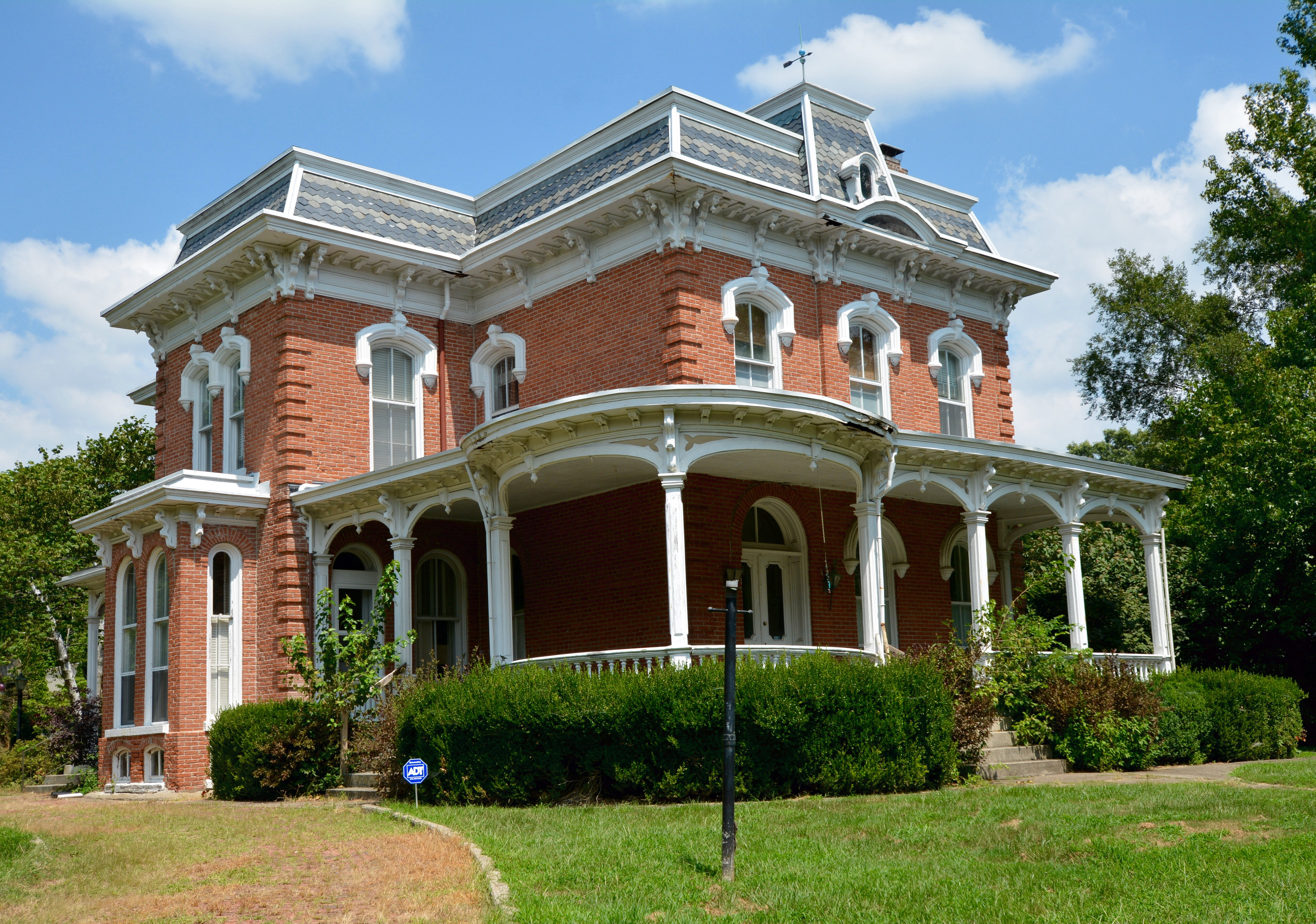

- Location within Illinois Location within the United States
- Location: 805 E. Union Ave., Litchfield, Illinois
- Coordinates: 39°10′42″N 89°38′47″W
- Area: 0.5 acres (0.20 ha)
- Built: 1873-74
- Architect: Barnett, George Ingham
- Architectural style: Second Empire
- NRHP reference No.: 90000156
- Added to NRHP: February 21, 1990

The Samuel Moody Grubbs House is a historic house located at 805 E. Union Ave. in Litchfield, Illinois. The house was built in 1873-74 for Samuel Moody Grubbs, a banker who later became Litchfield's mayor. George Ingham Barnett, a prominent St. Louis architect, designed the Second Empire house; it is the only standing Barnett design in Illinois. The design is typical of the second half of Barnett's career, when he shifted from Italianate to Second Empire designs, and represents a popular style in postbellum America. A mansard roof with slate tiles tops the house; a cornice running along the roofline features paired brackets. The front of the house features a wraparound porch supported by columns. The house's corners have bold quoins. In a deviation from the typical rectangular plans of Second Empire houses, Barnett gave the house a cross axis plan with projecting wings.

The house was added to the National Register of Historic Places on February 21, 1990.
