= Estella Bagnelle =

American politician

Estella Bagnelle (also known as Mary Estelle Bagnelle) was an American public school educator and administrator serving in the roles of teacher, principal of schools, member of the board of education, and county superintendent of schools. She served as County Superintendent of Instruction for Madera County, California from 1899 until 1911.

== Early years and education ==
Her father, J. D. Bagnelle, was born in Mississippi, of an old southern family descended from French progenitors and identified with the early history of Virginia. During his early manhood, he moved to Illinois and engaged in the mercantile business at Litchfield, until his early death. He married Amanda Slaughter (born December 28, 1901, Tennessee). The Slaughter family is traced back to 1608 in Scotland, and three brothers coming from that country founded the family in America.

Estella Bagnelle's education, begun in Litchfield, her native town, was completed in the state normal school of San Jose, California (now San Jose State University), from which she was graduated in 1885.

== Career ==
After teaching for a year in San Jose, in 1887 she began to teach in the district schools of Madera county, and afterward was for eight years connected with the Madera schools. During the first six years of this time, she held the position of vice-principal and then for two years served as principal. In 1898, she was nominated for county superintendent of schools on the Democratic ticket and received a majority of 140, taking the oath of office in January, 1899, for a term of four years. At the expiration of that time, in 1902, she was re-elected without opposition.

There are four improvements for which she has labored indefatigably, namely: uniformity of text books; higher standard of teachers; better salaries; and more interest among trustees. Aside from her duties as superintendent, she served as secretary of the San Joaquin Teachers' Association, was interested in the National Educational Association, and had sympathy with all movements for the benefit of the profession. May, 1893, she was chosen a member of the county board of education, at the time of the organization of Madera county, and after 1899, she officiated as secretary of the board.

== Personal life ==
After retiring in January, 1911, she married the miner, Oscar H. McDonald, of Coarsegold, California on April 5, in Oakland, and they removed to Nome, Alaska on May 1.
