= Harry C. Stuttle =

American politician

Harry Conrad Stuttle (February 25, 1879–July 14, 1947) was an American lawyer, judge, and politician.

Stuttle was born in Litchfield, Illinois. He went to the Litchfield public schools and to the University of Illinois. Stuttle was admitted to the Illinois bar and practiced law in Litchfield. He served as state's attorney for Montgomery County, Illinois and as judge for the Litchfield City Court. Stuttle was a Democrat. He served in the Illinois Senate from 1933 to 1941. Stuttle died suddenly at his home in Litchfield, Illinois.
