= Sun Odyssey 31 =

Sailboat class

Development
- Designer: Daniel Andrieu
- Location: France
- Year: 1991
- Builder: Jeanneau
- Role: Cruiser
- Name: Sun Odyssey 31

Boat
- Displacement: 6,834 lb (3,100 kg)
- Draft: 5.74 ft (1.75 m)

Hull
- Type: monohull
- Construction: fiberglass
- LOA: 30.51 ft (9.30 m)
- LWL: 25.26 ft (7.70 m)
- Beam: 10.60 ft (3.23 m)
- Engine: Yanmar 2GM20 diesel engine

Hull appendages
- Keel: fin keel
- Ballast: 2,650 lb (1,202 kg)
- Rudder: spade-type rudder

Rig
- Rig type: Bermuda rig
- I foretriangle height: 36.09 ft (11.00 m)
- J foretriangle base: 10.66 ft (3.25 m)
- P mainsail luff: 36.74 ft (11.20 m)
- E mainsail foot: 12.14 ft (3.70 m)

Sails
- Sailplan: masthead sloop
- Mainsail area: 223.01 sq ft (20.718 m^{2})
- Jib/genoa area: 192.36 sq ft (17.871 m^{2})
- Total sail area: 415.37 sq ft (38.589 m^{2})

The Sun Odyssey 31 is a French sailboat that was designed by Daniel Andrieu as a cruiser and first built in 1991.

The Sun Odyssey 31 is a dervivative of the 1986 Sun Light 30 and is related to the 1991 Sun Fast 31 design.

== Production ==
The design was built by Jeanneau in France, from 1991 to 1997, but it is now out of production.

== Design ==
The Sun Odyssey 31 is a recreational keelboat, built predominantly of fiberglass, with wood trim. It has a masthead sloop rig. The hull has a raked stem a reverse transom with a swimming platform, an internally mounted spade-type rudder controlled by a tiller and a fixed fin keel or optional shoal-draft keel. It displaces 6,834 lb (3,100 kg) and carries 2,650 lb (1,202 kg) of ballast.

The boat has a draft of 5.74 ft (1.75 m) with the standard keel and 4.76 ft (1.45 m) with the optional shoal draft keel.

The boat is fitted with a Japanese Yanmar 2GM20 diesel engine for docking and maneuvering. The fuel tank holds 12 U.S. gallons (45 L; 10.0 imp gal) and the fresh water tank has a capacity of 24 U.S. gallons (91 L; 20 imp gal).

The design was built with two factory interior layouts. The first layout has sleeping accommodation for four people, with a double "V"-berth in the bow cabin and an aft cabin with a double berth on the port side. There is a U-shaped settee with a table in the main cabin. The galley is located on the port side admidships. The galley is straight and is equipped with a two-burner stove, an ice box and a sink. A navigation station is aft the galley, on the port side. The head is located abeam the companionway ladder on the starboard side.

The second optional interior layout has sleeping accommodation for six people, with a double "V"-berth in the bow cabin, two straight settees, with a drop-leaf table in the main cabin and an aft cabin with a double berth on the port side. The galley is located on the port side, at the companionway ladder. The galley is L-shaped and is equipped with a two-burner stove, an ice box and a sink. A navigation station is opposite the galley, on the starboard side. The head is located beside the companionway ladder on the starboard side.

The design has a hull speed of 6.74 kn (12.48 km/h).

== See also ==
- List of sailing boat types
