= Manske–Niemann Farm =

- U.S. National Register of Historic Places
- U.S. Historic district
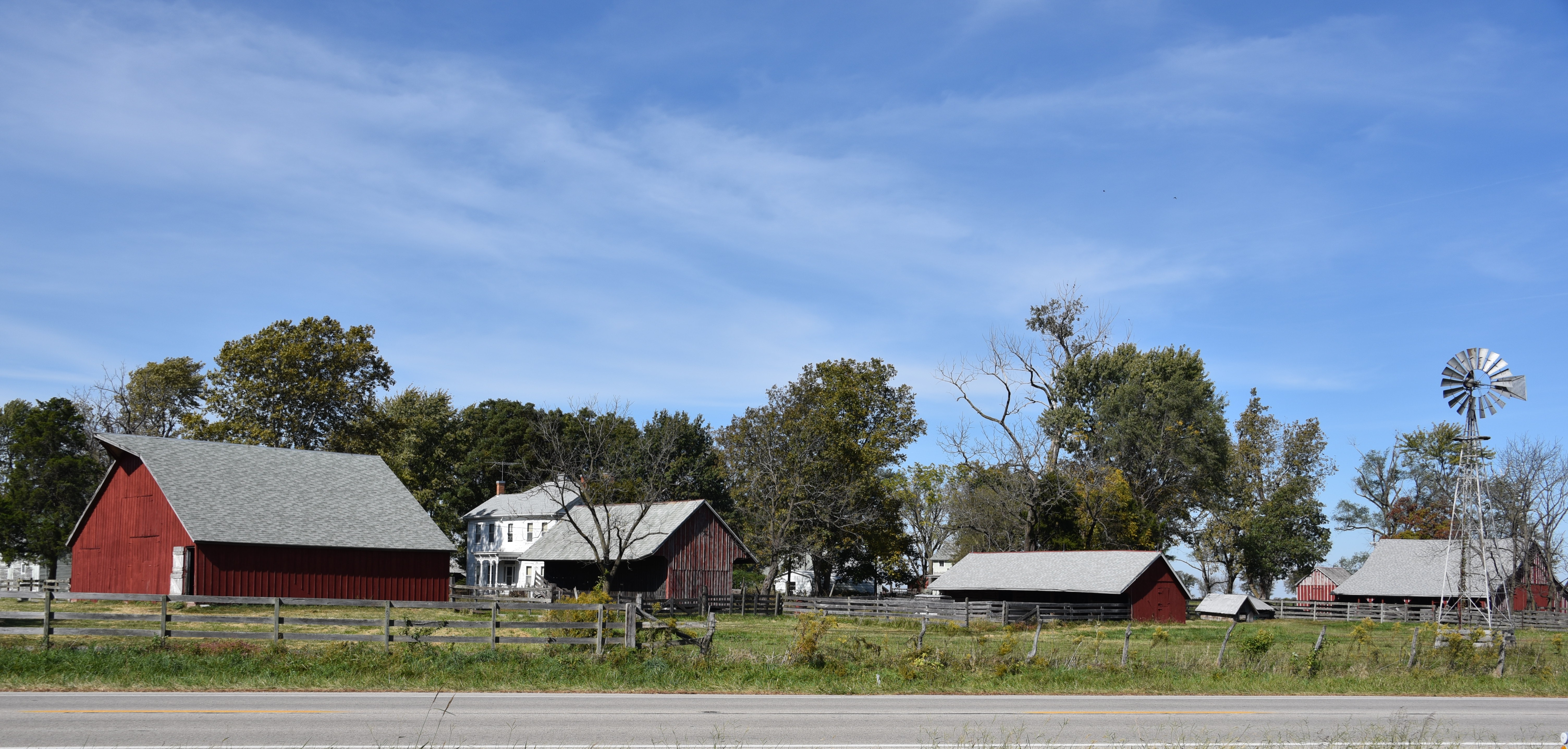

- Location within Illinois Location within the United States
- Location: 13 Franks Ln., Litchfield, Illinois
- Coordinates: 39°8′18″N 89°41′3″W
- Area: 462 acres (187 ha)
- Architectural style: I-House
- NRHP reference No.: 03000065
- Added to NRHP: February 27, 2003

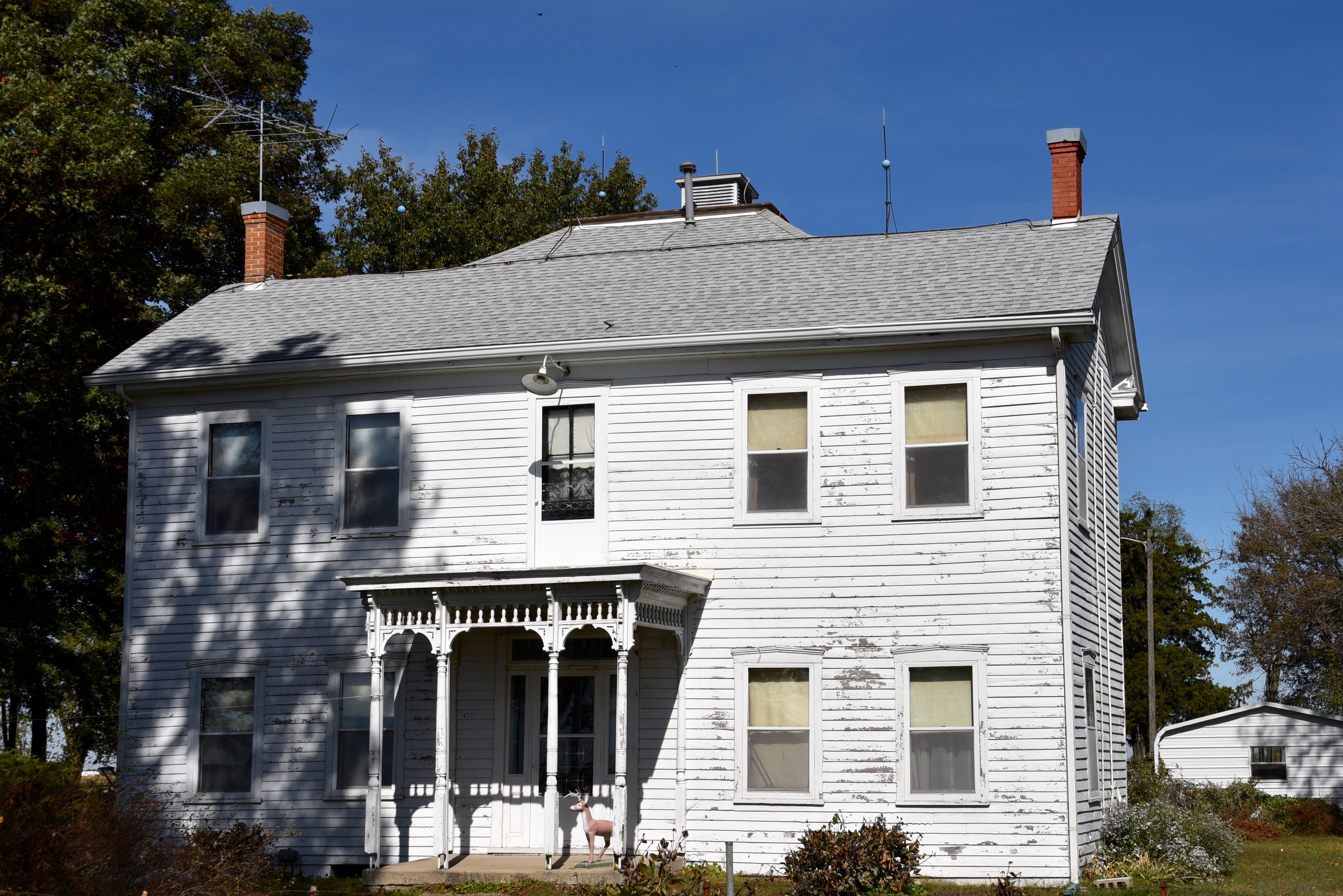
The Manske–Niemann house

The Manske–Niemann Farm is a historic 462-acre (187 ha) farm complex located at 13 Franks Lane near Litchfield, Illinois. The farm was most likely established in the 1850s and was purchased by German immigrant Michael Manske in 1863. Manske and his family developed and expanded the farm in three main stages. The first stage, completed in the 1860s and 1870s, included the original I-house, horse barn, and smokehouse. In the 1890s, the family added a granary, corncrib, cow barn, and other buildings to the farm, representing shifts in the farm's crops and livestock. An expansion in the first two decades of the 20th century included a third barn, numerous animal sheds and feed buildings, and structures needed for the mechanization of the farm, such as a gas pump and car shed. The farm remains in the Manske–Niemann family, and was owned by Michael Manske's great-great-granddaughter Ophelia Niemann as of 2002; it is a well-preserved example of a German immigrant farmstead.

The house was added to the National Register of Historic Places on February 27, 2003.
