= Menger Cat 19 =

Sailboat class

Development
- Designer: Bill and Andrew Menger
- Location: United States
- Year: 1990
- Builders: Menger Boatworks; Wagner Boatworks; Thompson Boatworks
- Role: Day sailer-cruiser

Boat
- Displacement: 2,900 lb (1,315 kg)
- Draft: 4.50 ft (1.37 m)

Hull
- Type: monohull
- Construction: fiberglass
- LOA: 19.00 ft (5.79 m)
- LWL: 18.42 ft (5.61 m)
- Beam: 8.00 ft (2.44 m)
- Engine: outboard motor or optional inboard engine

Hull appendages
- Keel: keel and centerboard
- Ballast: 600 lb (272 kg)
- Rudder: transom-mounted rudder

Rig
- Rig type: gaff-rigged catboat

Sails
- Sailplan: catboat
- Mainsail area: 270.00 sq ft (25.084 m^{2})
- Total sail area: 270.00 sq ft (25.084 m^{2})

Racing
- PHRF: 369

The Menger Cat 19, also sold as the Thom Cat 19 Catboat, is an American trailerable sailboat that was designed by father and son team Bill Menger and Andrew Menger as a daysailer and cruiser and first built in 1990.

The Menger Cat 19 is a development of the Menger Cat 17, designed after the Menger Cat 17 molds were destroyed in a lightning-caused fire in 1990.

== Production ==
The design was built by Menger Boatworks in Babylon, New York, United States from 1990 until the company went out of business in 2004.

It was also later produced by Wagner Boatworks of Oyster Bay, New York and also by Thompson Boatworks of West Sayville, New York under the name Thom Cat 19 Catboat. It remains in production under that name.

== Design ==
The Menger Cat 19 is a recreational keelboat, built predominantly of fiberglass, with wood trim. It has a catboat rig, a plumb stem, a slightly angled transom, a transom-hung rudder controlled by a tiller and a fixed stub keel and retractable centerboard. It displaces 2,900 lb (1,315 kg) and carries 600 lb (272 kg) of ballast.

The boat has a draft of 4.50 ft (1.37 m) with the centerboard extended and 1.83 ft (0.56 m) with it retracted, allowing operation in shallow water, beaching or ground transportation on a trailer.

The boat is normally fitted with a small 4 to 6 hp (3 to 4 kW) outboard motor for docking and maneuvering, although a Yanmar or Nanni Industries 10 hp (7 kW) inboard diesel engine with a fuel tank that holds 12 U.S. gallons (45 L; 10.0 imp gal) is optional.

The design has sleeping accommodation for two people, with a double "V"-berth in the bow cabin around a drop-leaf table that is attached to the centerboard trunk. The galley is located on the starboard side just forward of the companionway ladder. The galley is equipped with a two-burner stove and a sink, with a portable icebox under the cockpit. The head is located opposite the galley on the port side. Cabin headroom is 58 in (147 cm).

The design has a PHRF racing average handicap of 369 and a hull speed of 5.8 kn (10.7 km/h).

== Operational history ==
In a 2000 review naval architect Bob Perry wrote, "the Menger 19 is in the style of the Cape Cod catboats and has the displacement to carry minimal accommodations. This is just the kind of boat I would like to send my boys off in for the summer when they both get to the teenage years. "Here's $500. See you at the end of August." Father's dreams. I long ago explained to my boys that when I buy them that new bike, I am buying myself the bike I never had. That new baseball mitt is the glove I always wanted. "Here, Bob Perry, take this Menger 19 and this $500. I'll see you at the end of August." Three strings to pull, a locker full of Dinty Moore stew and three months to explore the San Juan Islands in a stalwart little catboat. What more could you need?"

In a 2010 review Steve Henkel wrote, "After a lightning fire destroyed the molds for the successful Menger 17 catboat ... Bill Menger and his son designed the Menger Cat 19, an 'expanded and improved' version of the 17, two feet longer, two inches deeper, and 700 pounds heavier (including 100 pounds more ballast). Obvious visual differences include the addition of an extra cabin port for more light, and a longer cockpit. Most of the extra two feet of length is in the aft end of the cockpit. (Compare the two boats’ inboard profiles aft of the cockpit hatch for where most of the space went.) The same 'best' and 'worst' features apply to the 19 as apply to the 17 ... Best features: The Menger 19 has more headroom than any of her comp[ettor]s, plus a better Motion Index (no doubt due to her combination of heavier displacement and longer length). The optional mast tabernacle works well, and is highly recommended for trailer-sailors. ... Worst features: Price is high."

== See also ==
- List of sailing boat types

Related development

- Menger Cat 17
