= House at 230 Winchester Street =

Historic house in Massachusetts, United States

- U.S. National Register of Historic Places
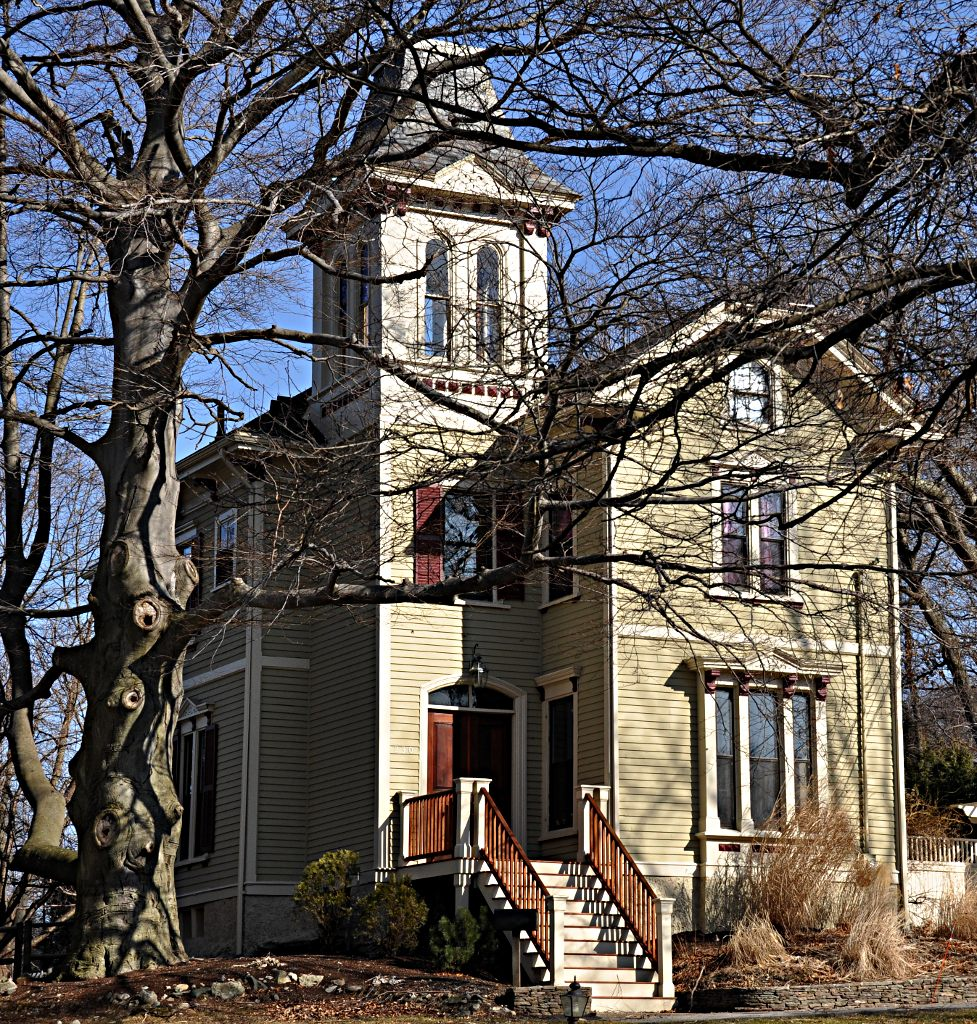

- Location within Massachusetts Location within the United States
- Location: 230 Winchester St., Newton, Massachusetts
- Coordinates: 42°18′44.0″N 71°12′30.5″W
- Built: 1873
- Architectural style: Italian Villa
- MPS: Newton MRA
- NRHP reference No.: 86001825
- Added to NRHP: September 04, 1986

The House at 230 Winchester Street in the Newton Highlands section of Newton, Massachusetts, is an elaborate and well-preserved Italianate house. The 2 1/2-story wood-frame house was built in 1873. Its most prominent feature is a 3 1/2-story mansard-roofed tower with paired narrow round-arch windows at the third level. The tower is located in the crook of the L-shaped house, whose side section is hip-roofed, while the front-facing section of the L has a hipped gable end with a round-arch window in the gable. The motif of a small gable section is repeated above some of the windows and in the roof line of the tower.

The house was listed on the National Register of Historic Places in 1986.

== See also ==
- National Register of Historic Places listings in Newton, Massachusetts
