= Menger Boatworks =

Sailboat manufacturer

- Company type: Privately held company
- Industry: Boat building
- Founded: 1976
- Defunct: 2004
- Headquarters: Babylon, New York, United States
- Key people: President: William Menger
- Products: Sailboats

Menger Boatworks was an American boat builder based in Babylon, New York on Long Island. The company specialized in the design and manufacture of fiberglass sailboats, particularly catboats and character boats.

The company was founded by William Menger in 1976. Hs son Andrew Menger also worked there and contributed to boat design.

== History ==
The first design produced was the Menger Oysterman 23. A William Menger design, it was a "character boat" based upon the general lines of the Howard Chappelle-designed Blue Crab skipjack. The boat was intended to resemble a traditional 19th century oyster fishing boat of Chesapeake Bay. It was produced with a ketch or optional masthead sloop rig.

The Oysterman 23 was followed by a series of catboats, all designed with the traditional east coast catboat features, such as shallow drafts and plumb stems. The Menger Cat 17 was designed by Andrew Menger in 1983 and based on the lines of a 1905 William Goeller design. When the molds for the Cat 17 were destroyed in a fire caused by lightning in 1990, the slightly larger Menger Cat 19 was designed by father and son team William and Andrew Menger as a replacement boat for the product line. The design was noted by reviewer Steve Henkel as being well-made, but expensive.

The Menger Cat 23, also designed by William and Andrew Menger, was added to the line in 1990. A 1991 review of the boat in Cruising World noted that it has, "tremendous cabin volume, load-carrying potential and form stability that come of this salty, ageless design."

The company went out of business in 2004.

Some of the company designs were picked up and produced by Wagner Boatworks of Oyster Bay, New York and also by Thompson Boatworks of West Sayville, New York. The Menger Cat 15 and 19 remain in production under the name Thom Cat 15 and 19.

== Boats ==
Summary of boats built by Menger Boatworks:

- Menger Oysterman 23 - 1977
- Menger Cat 17 - 1983
- Menger Cat 19 - 1990
- Menger Cat 23 - 1990
- Menger Cat 15 - 2001

== See also ==
- List of sailboat designers and manufacturers
