= Newton Highlands Historic District =

Historic district in Massachusetts, United States

- U.S. National Register of Historic Places
- U.S. Historic district
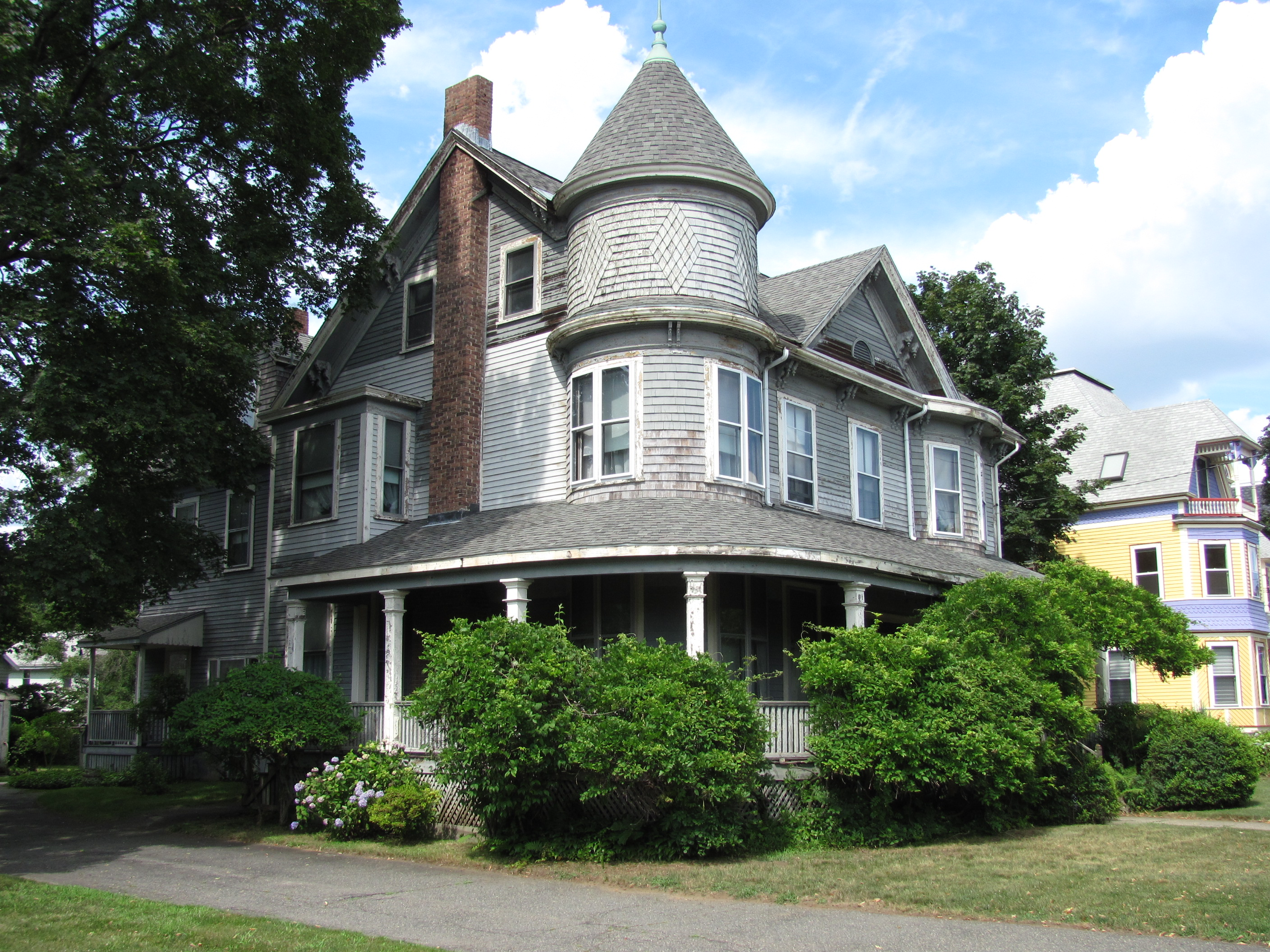
- House on Lincoln Street

- Location within Massachusetts Location within the United States
- Location: Roughly bounded by Lincoln and Hartford Sts., Erie Ave., and Woodward St., Newton, Massachusetts
- Coordinates: 42°19′13″N 71°12′39″W
- Area: 19 acres (7.7 ha)
- Architect: Walker, Samuel A.; Et al.
- Architectural style: Colonial Revival, Late Victorian, Gothic Revival
- MPS: Newton MRA
- NRHP reference No.: 86001747 (original); 90000013 (increase)

Significant dates
- Added to NRHP: September 04, 1986
- Boundary increase: February 16, 1990

The Newton Highlands Historic District encompasses the historic heart of the village of Newton Highlands in Newton, Massachusetts. When it was added to the National Register of Historic Places in 1986, the district extended along Lincoln Street from Woodward to Hartford Streets, and included blocks of Bowdoin, Erie and Hartford Streets south of Lincoln Street. The district was enlarged in 1990 to include the cluster of commercial buildings on Lincoln Street between Hartford and Walnut Streets.

The original district was predominantly residential in character, with most of the housing stock built between c. 1874 and 1911. The most common architectural styles found are Queen Anne and Colonial Revival. Development of the area was spurred by improvements in railroad service to the area spurred by town selectman (and later the city's first mayor) James F. C. Hyde. The district also includes the 1895 Romanesque Hyde School, named in his honor. The cluster of commercial buildings along Lincoln and Walnut Street which were added to the district in 1990 were also built in this time frame. Distinctive among these commercial buildings is the automotive garage at 1151 Walnut Street, built in 1928, which is the only surviving building of that type in the area.

Other civic buildings in the district include the Newton Highlands branch of the Newton Free Library, an 1886 Queen Anne construction, and two churches: the Methodist Episcopal Church, built in 1893 in the Shingle style, and the Newton Highlands Congregational Church, a Gothic Revival structure built in 1906.

== See also ==
- Newton Railroad Stations Historic District, which includes the H.H. Richardson Newton Highlands station building
- National Register of Historic Places listings in Newton, Massachusetts
