= Litchfield Public Library (Illinois) =

- U.S. National Register of Historic Places
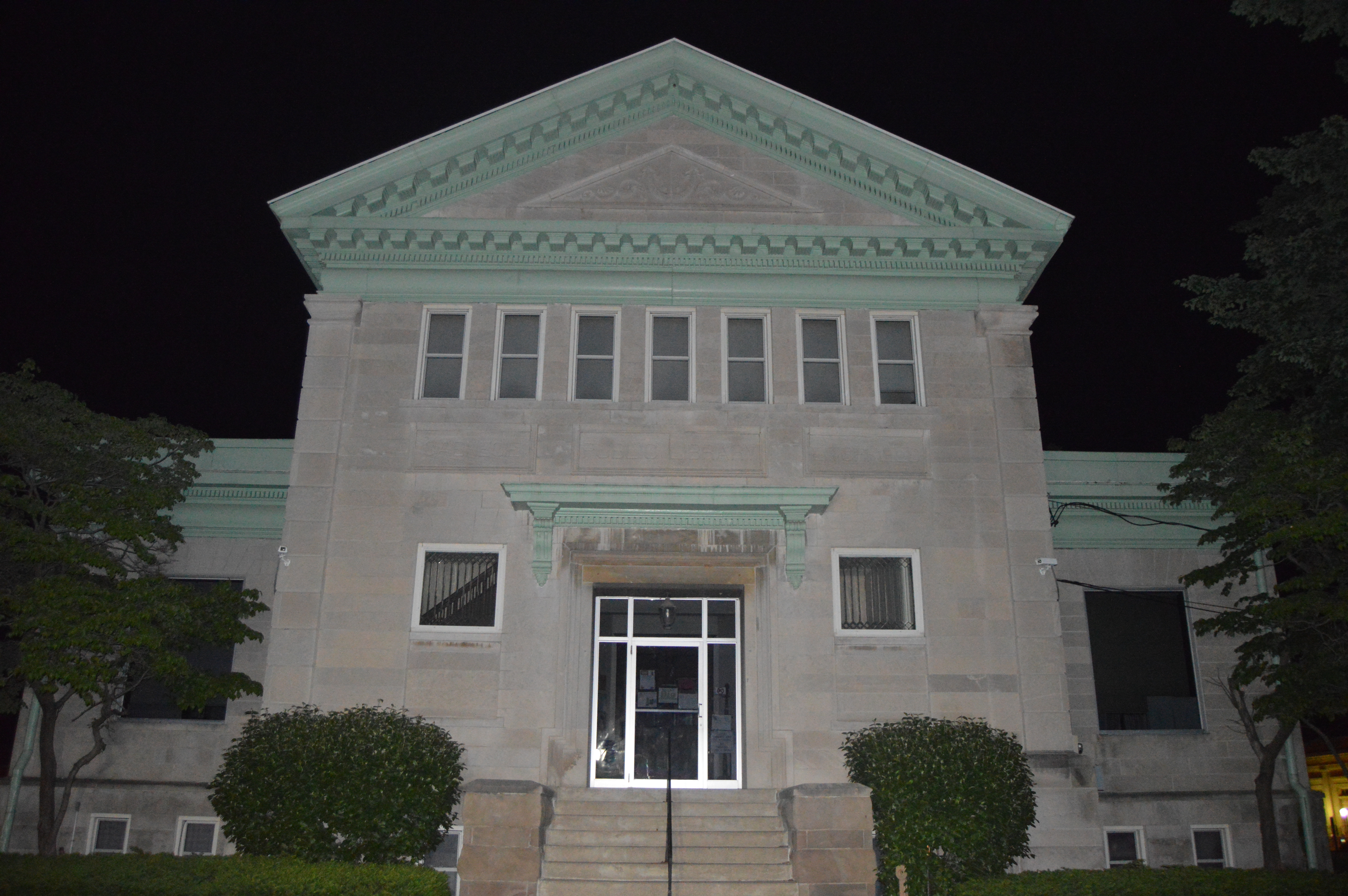

- Location within Illinois Location within the United States
- Location: 400 N. State St., Litchfield, Illinois
- Coordinates: 39°10′40″N 89°39′17″W
- Area: less than one acre
- Built: 1904-05
- Built by: Rees, John
- Architect: Moratz, Paul
- Architectural style: Classical Revival
- MPS: Illinois Carnegie Libraries MPS
- NRHP reference No.: 99000165
- Added to NRHP: February 12, 1999

The Litchfield Public Library is a Carnegie library located at 400 N. State St. in Litchfield, Illinois. The library was built in 1904-05 through a $10,000 donation from the Carnegie Foundation.

== History ==
Litchfield's library program had been in existence since 1882. Prior to the construction of the library, it had been housed in the Cline Building and later the First National Bank, but by the early 1900s it had outgrown these spaces.

Architect Paul Moratz designed the library building in the Classical Revival style. Litchfield's Women's Club and Chamber of Commerce ran the library for its first few decades and provided funds for improvements such as restrooms.

In addition, a children's library program began in 1914 through the assistance of the public school system. The library still serves Litchfield and holds a collection of 34,000 books.

The library was added to the National Register of Historic Places on February 12, 1999.
