= Fuel filter =

Filter used to strain fuel in fuel systems

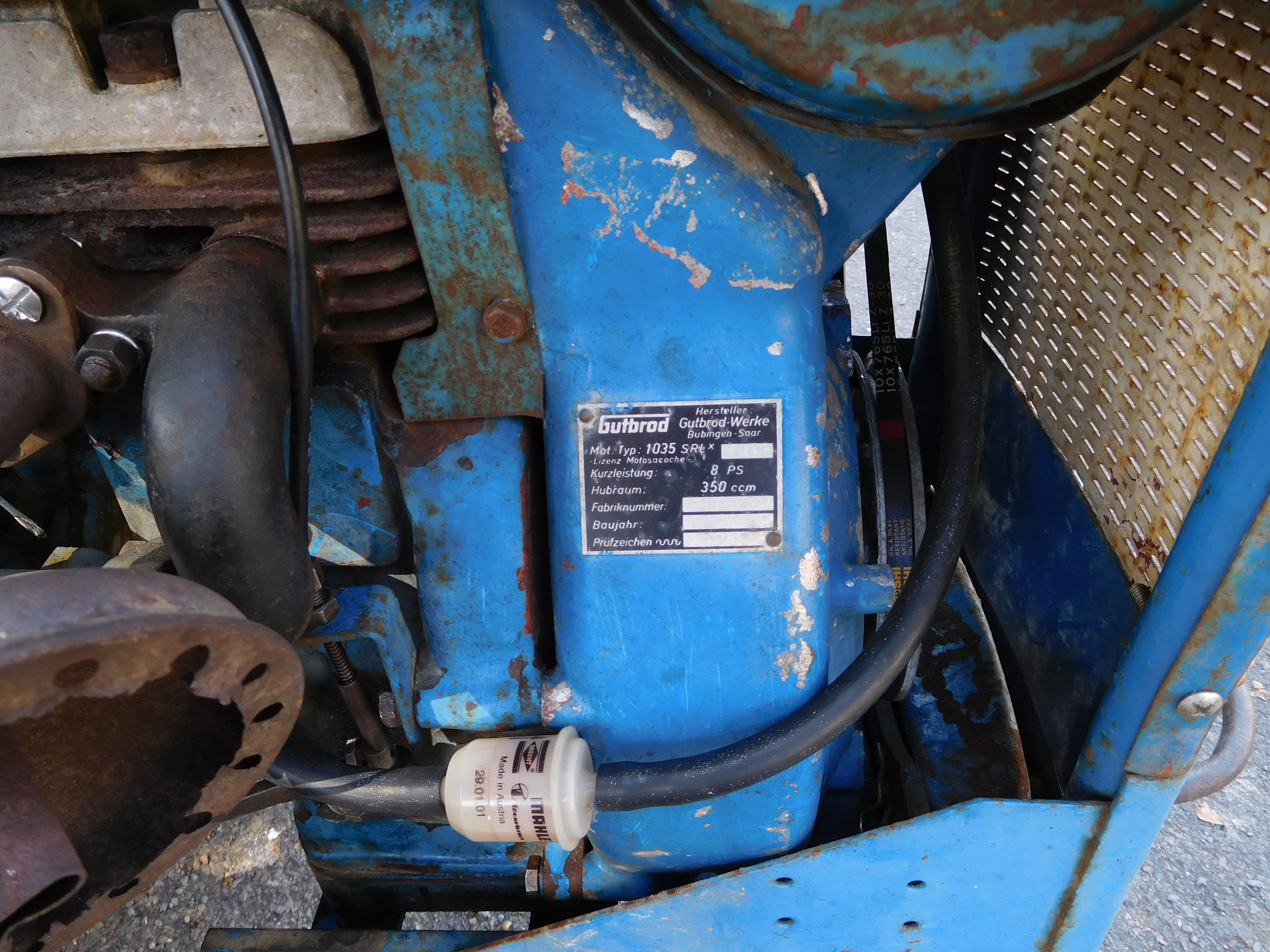
Fuel filter (small cylinder in white) for a tractor engine

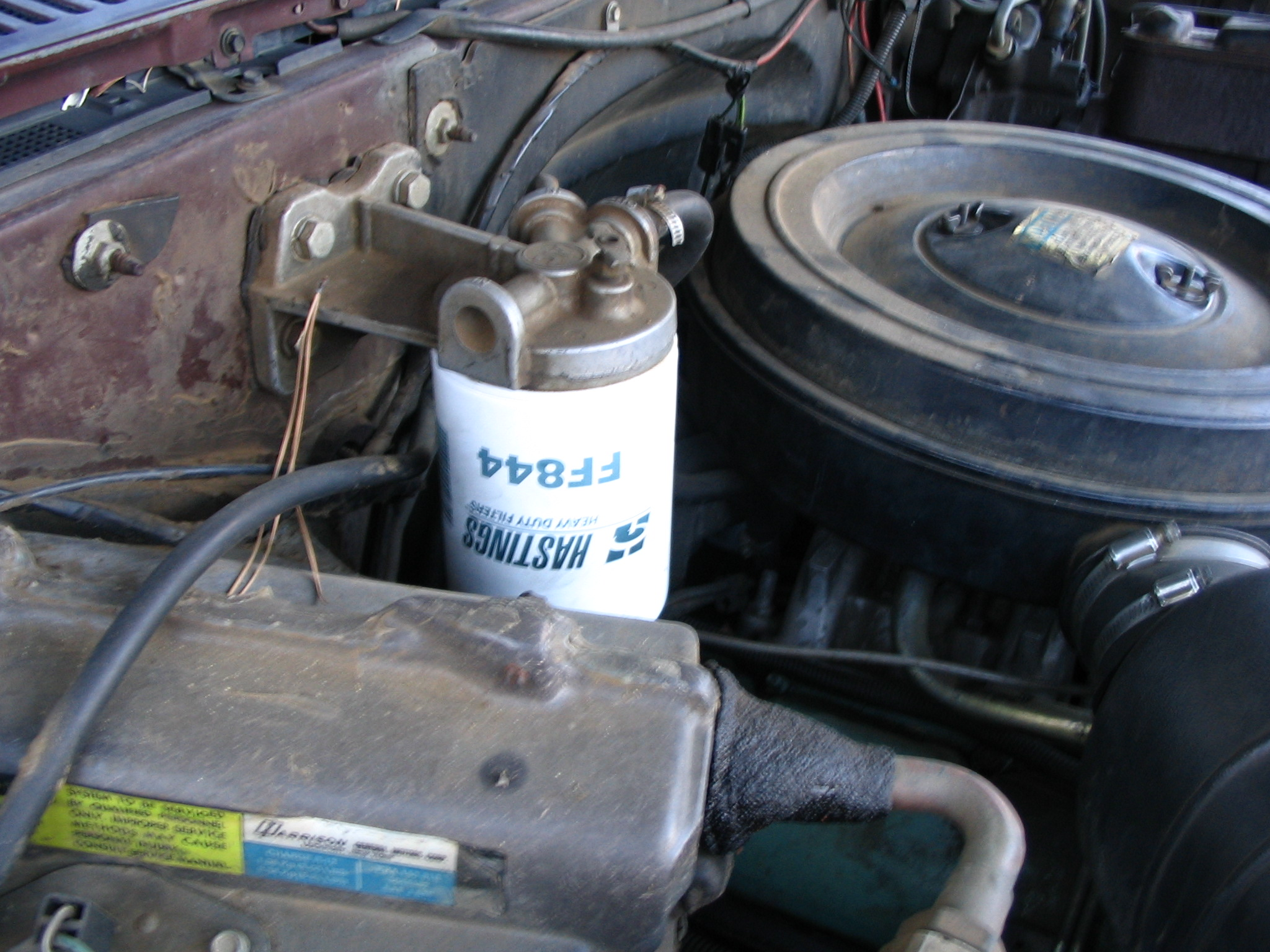
Fuel filter (in white) in a 1982 GMC Sierra

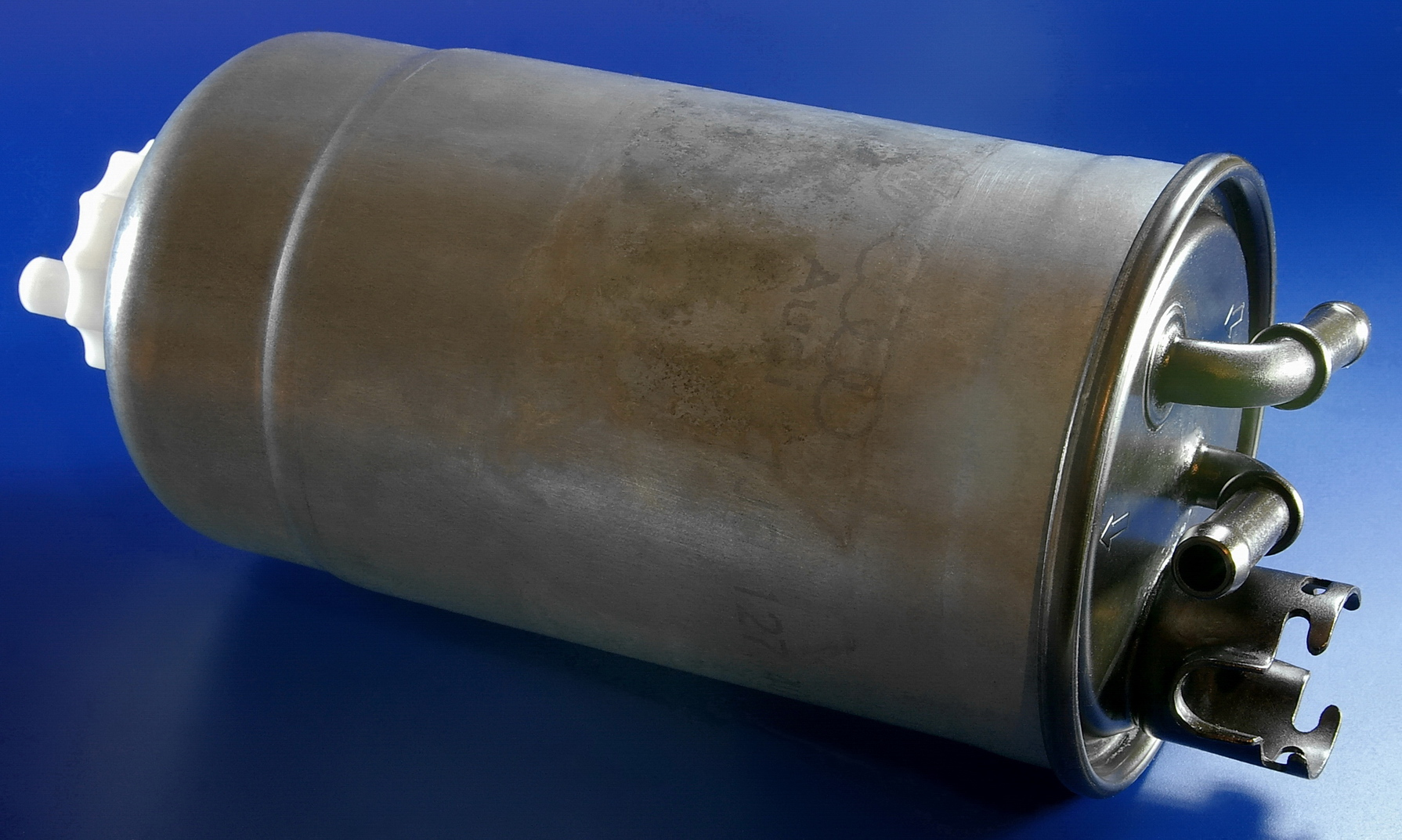
Fuel filter for diesel Volkswagen car engines

A fuel filter is a filter used to screen out foreign particles or liquids from the fuel. Most internal combustion engines use a fuel filter in order to protect the components in the fuel system.

== Filters for foreign particles ==
Unfiltered fuel may contain several kinds of contamination, for example paint chips and dirt that has entered the fuel tank while filling, or rust caused by moisture in a steel tank. If these substances are not removed before the fuel enters the system, they will cause rapid wear and failure of the fuel pump and injectors.

The filters are normally made into cartridges containing a filter paper. Fuel filters need to be maintained or replaced at regular intervals.

== Filters for foreign liquids ==
Some diesel engines use a bowl-like design to collect water in the bottom of the filter (as diesel floats on top of water). The water can then be drained off by opening a valve in the bottom of the bowl and letting it run out, until only the fuel remains.

== See also ==
- Fuel pump
- Fuel tank
- List of auto parts
