= Ariston Café =

- U.S. National Register of Historic Places
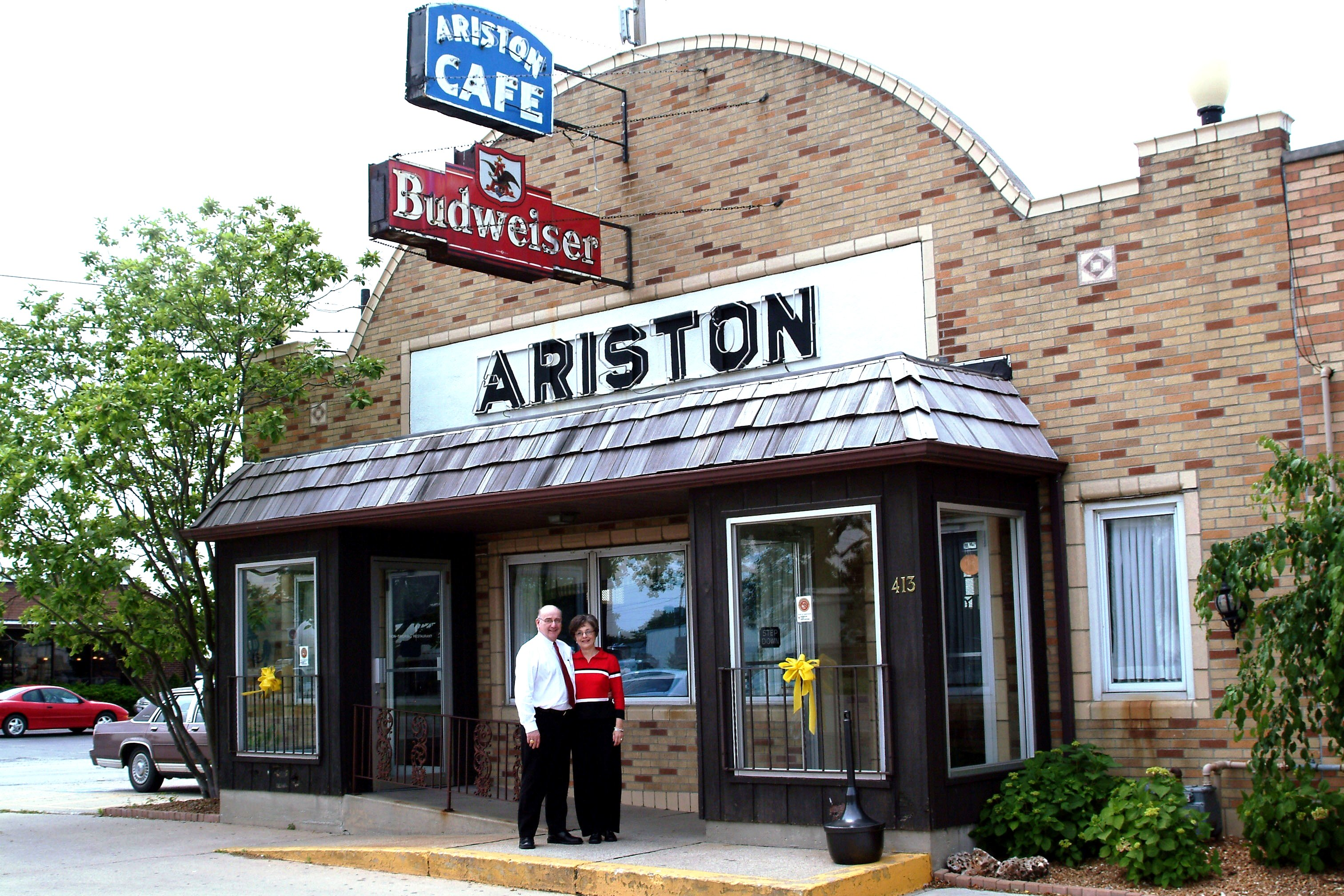

- Location within Illinois Location within the United States
- Location: 413 Old Route 66, Litchfield, Illinois
- Coordinates: 39°10′39″N 89°40′01″W
- Area: less than one acre
- Built: 1935
- Architect: Henry A. Vasel (builder)
- Architectural style: No particular style; allusions to Art Deco
- MPS: Route 66 through Illinois MPS
- NRHP reference No.: 06000380
- Added to NRHP: May 5, 2006

The Ariston Café is a historic restaurant located in Litchfield, Illinois, United States, along Old U.S. Route 66. It was added to the U.S. National Register of Historic Places in 2006.

== History ==
The Ariston Café in Litchfield (named from the Greek word “aristo”—meaning, “the best.”) was built in 1935 for original owners Pete Adam and Tom Cokinos, two experienced restaurateurs. Pete Adam had operated an Ariston Café in Carlinville since 1924; after 1930 a highway realignment moved U.S. Route 66 in Illinois further east. Work began on April 4, 1935, by hired contractor Henry A. Vasel and the building was completed on July 5, 1935.

== Design ==
The design of the Ariston Café does not reflect any particular architectural style. Instead, it was built in a utilitarian style, common for small commercial buildings of its time. Despite being non-stylistic, the building does contain echoes of the popular Art Deco style of the time period in its interior booths. On its exterior the Ariston's most distinguishing features are the curved parapet wall on the front façade and its fine and varied brick work. Originally, the Ariston, like many Route 66 businesses, had two fuel pumps fronting it.

== Historic significance ==
The Ariston Café is the longest-operating restaurant along the entire stretch of U.S. Route 66. It is representative of the types of businesses that once met with great success along historic Route 66. Despite a few alterations, including the addition of a banquet room, the building still maintains a historic character from the era of its construction. The Ariston Café was listed on the U.S. National Register of Historic Places on May 5, 2006. The Ariston, is identified as being over one hundred years old during the Route 66 Centennial year in 2026 in American Road Magazine's Volume 23, Number 4, feature article titled: "100 Years on Route 66: 50 Sites that have Hit the Century Mark on the Mother Road."

== See also ==
- U.S. Route 66 in Illinois
