= Yanmar 2GM20 =

Diesel boat engine

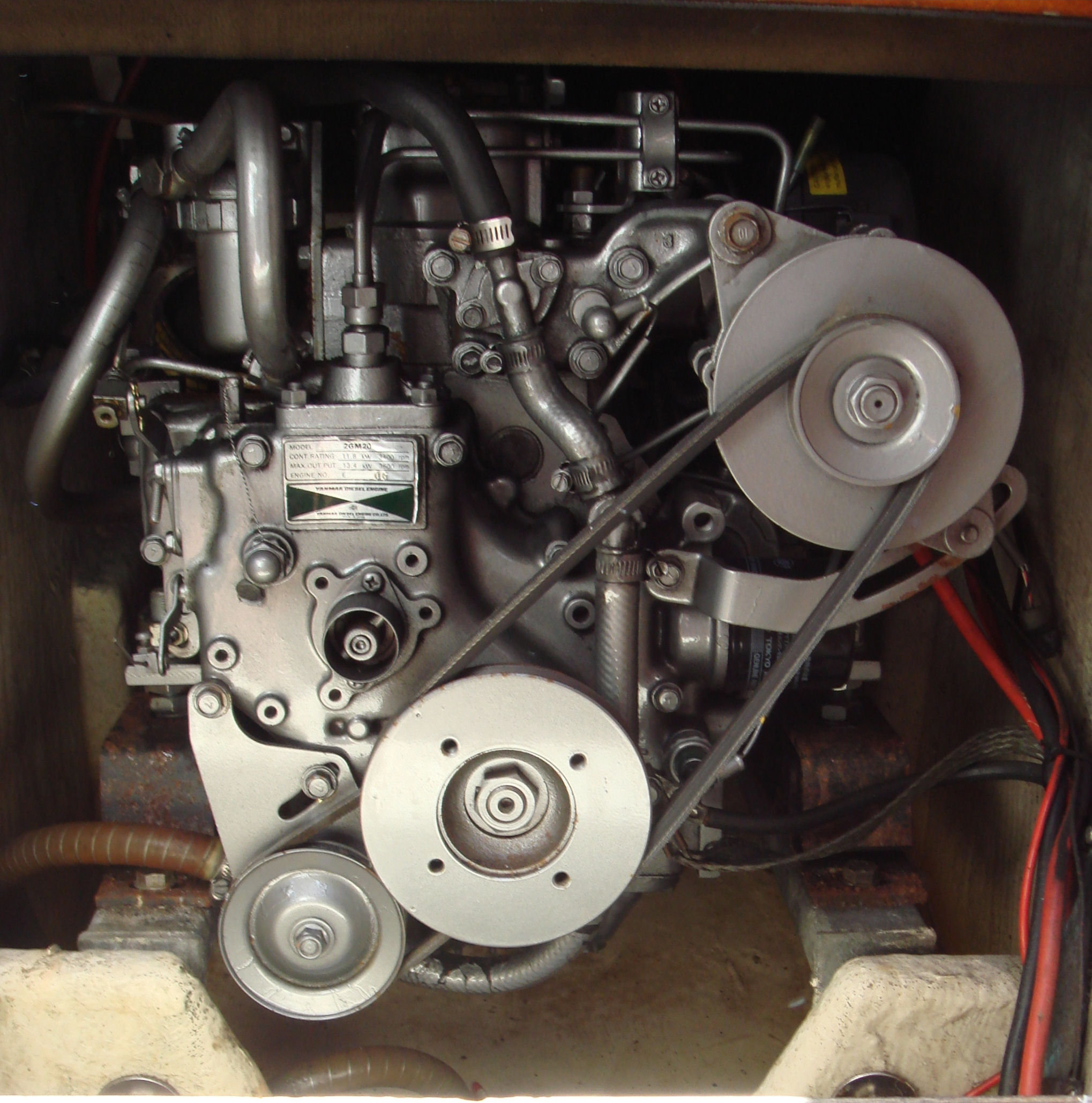
A Yanmar 2GM20 marine diesel engine, installed in a sailboat. The center pulley is the crankshaft, the lower left one the seawater pump, the upper right one the alternator.

The Yanmar 2GM20 is a series of inboard marine diesel engines manufactured by the Japanese company Yanmar Co. Ltd. It is used in a wide range of sailboats and motorboats. The 2GM20 is out of production and has been superseded by the newer Yanmar 3YM20 series.

== Specifications ==
It is a four-stroke, vertical, water-cooled diesel engine. It is built around two cylinders (hence the "2" in 2GM20) of 75 mm in diameter and 72 mm in stroke, adding up to 0.635 litres in displacement: each cylinder is roughly the size and volume of a 300 ml soft-drink can. The compression system uses a proprietary swirl-type pre-combustion chamber.

The continuous rating output at the crankshaft is 11.8 kW, at 3400 revolutions per minute (rpm). The maximum output at the crankshaft is 13.4 kW, at 3600 rpm.

The engine delivers roughly 16 horsepower, for a weight of about 114 kg.

The engine is equipped with a starting motor (D.C. 12V, 1 kW), and an alternator to provide electricity and charge onboard batteries (12V, 55A).

The engine is typically activated by a key and a starting motor switch. Upon turning the key and pressing the starting motor switch, the oil pressure alarm will ring for about a second until the engine starts to run. The exit of cooling water from the exhaust into the sea (typically at the aft of the boat) should be checked at that time. After a few minutes, the hot cooling water alarm will sound if the cooling water does not get through the engine (as when the seawater cock has remained closed -most likely case- or if something is clogging the seawater tubing).

=== Water pump ===
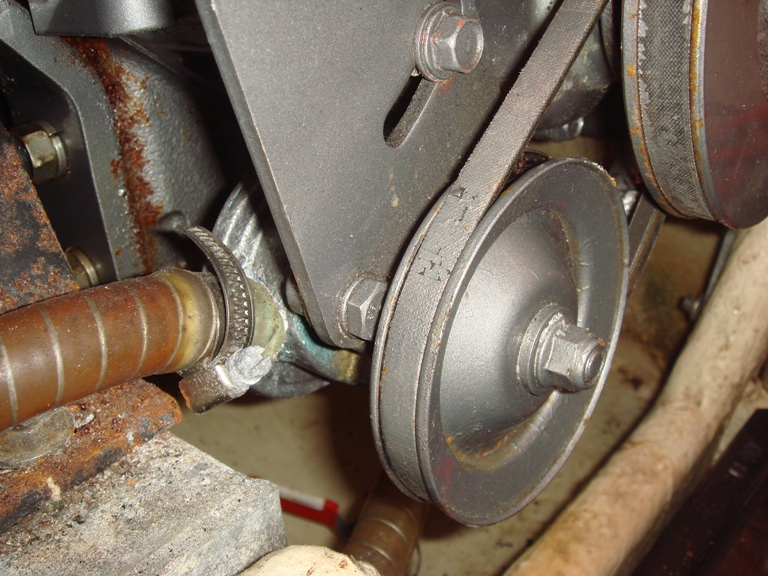
Yanmar 2GM20 seawater pump. Cooling seawater enters from the tube on the left.

The 2GM20 series uses either a direct seawater cooling system, or an indirect freshwater cooling system (specified by the suffix letter F i.e. 2GM20F). Seawater is pumped into the engine through a seawater pump (impeller type). In the engines equipped with a direct seawater cooling system, seawater is used to cool the internals of the engine directly. The engines equipped with a fresh water cooling system have an additional heat exchanger, where heat transfer occurs between the seawater and internal freshwater.

The impeller of the seawater pump can suffer from wear and tear, especially when run dry for some period of time, in which case it has to be replaced to avoid loss in the flow of cooling seawater, a potential source of engine overheating.

A particularly difficult problem in tropical waters is jellyfish. Their tentacles can be sucked into water intakes. In extremes, it is possible for the rubber exhaust hose to catch fire, the plastic silencer to melt and the head-gasket to fail. In colder waters, boats are far less likely to meet such problems. The solution is to have a large basket-type water strainer and overheat alarms (standard on most Yanmar engines)

The seawater pump is rotated by a short belt linked to the crankshaft.

=== Fuel filter ===
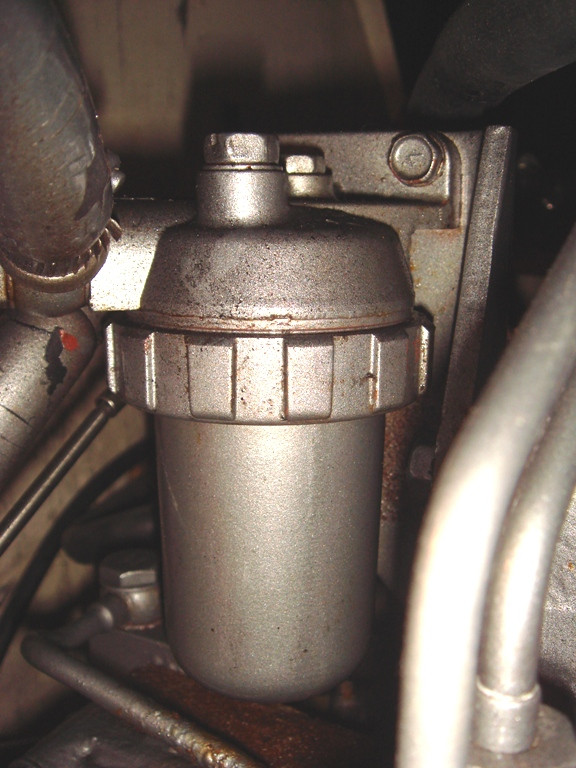
Yanmar 2GM20 fuel filter.

An inline fuel filter is easily accessible from the front part of the engine. The filter retains solid particles and separates water from diesel (as water is heavier than diesel, it will settle at the bottom of the filter), just before the diesel fuel enters the highly sensitive high-pressure fuel pump. The water inside diesel fuel can lead to rusting of the internals of the engine, as well as lubrication problems. The filter element is made of fluted paper with metal end caps.

When the engine has to be bled because air has penetrated into the pipes (usually after running out of diesel), it will usually be necessary to bleed the diesel filter: the top vent is unscrewed so as to let the excess air escape, while diesel fuel is pumped into the fuel filter with the manual fuel lift pump (just behind the yellow dipstick). The vent can be screwed shut when diesel fuel starts to gush out of it.

A primary fuel filter is usually installed upstream of the engine, so as to filter out the larger particles and filter a larger quantity of water that might be present in the fuel.

Every time a filter is disassembled or changed, it will be necessary to bleed it so as to remove excess air, again by opening the top vent so as to let diesel chase all the air (diesel fills up the filter either through gravity -usually the case for the primary filter- or with the help of the fuel lift pump -usually the case for the engine fuel filter-) and diesel starts to gush out. The vent should then be screwed shut.

== New models ==
The 2GM20 and 3GM30 (three-cylinder) series have now been superseded in the Yanmar catalog by the new lightweight and modernized engines, the 2YM15, 3YM20, and 3YM30. These new engines also feature simplified maintenance of the seawater pump and other services points, as they are now located on the front part of the engine. These new engines also meet new Tier II emission standards introduced in the EU and the US in 2006.

== Parts ==
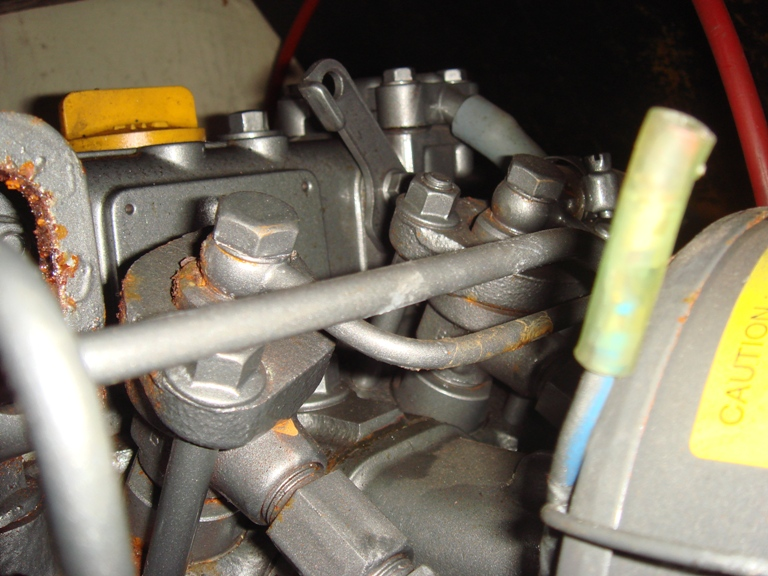
Yanmar 2GM20 injectors.

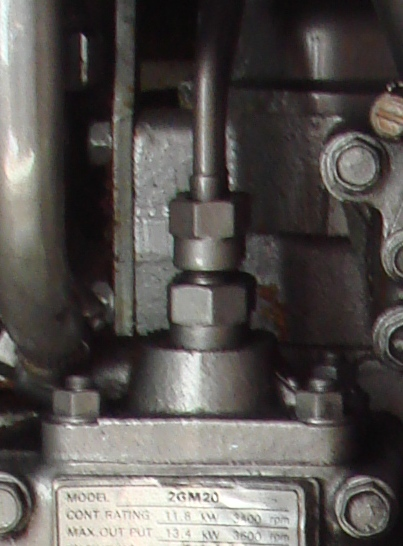
Yanmar 2GM20 high pressure fuel pump.

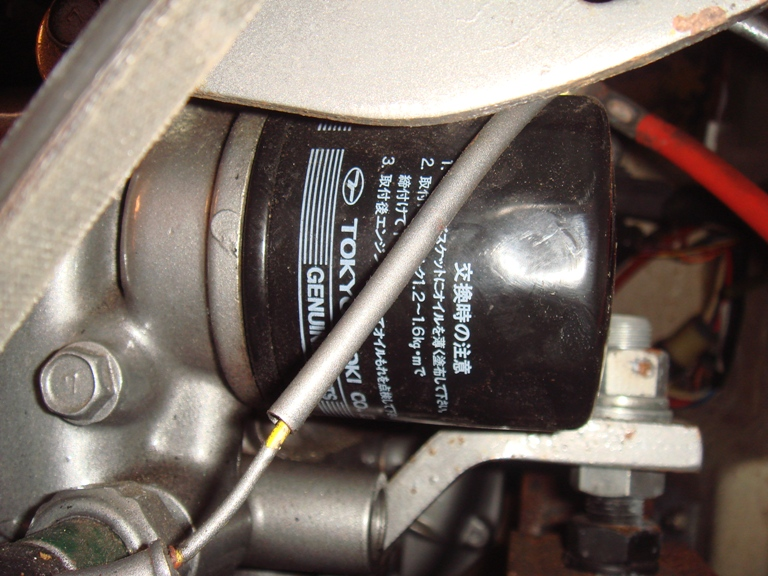
Yanmar 2GM20 oil filter.

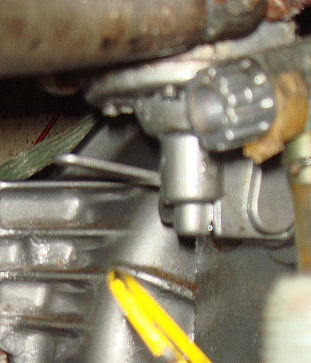
Yanmar 2GM20 dipstick (yellow) and fuel lift pump (top).

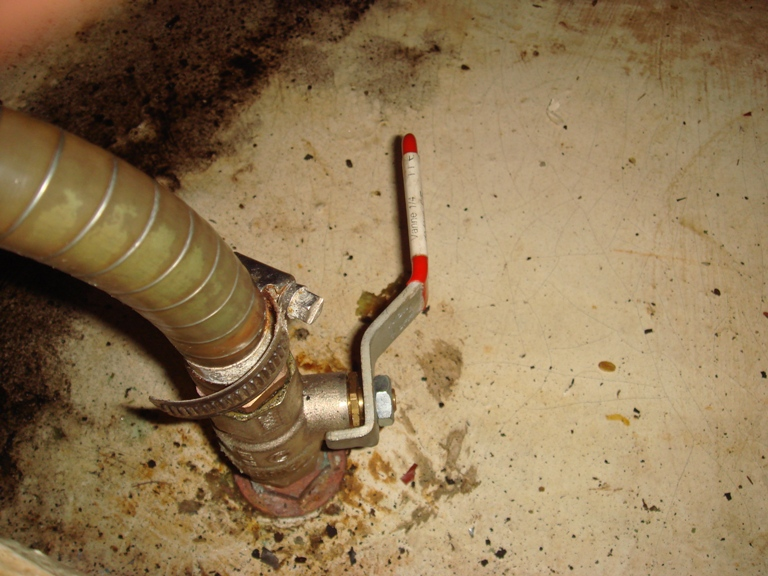
Yanmar 2GM20 cooling seawater cock (in closed position).

== Applications ==
- CS 34
- Dana 24
- Freedom 30
- JOD 35
- Menger Cat 23
- Mirage 30/32
- Morgan 32
- Pearson 28
- Sun Fast 31
- Sun Odyssey 31

== Versions ==
- Yanmar 2GM20: Marine main engine (for export), seawater cooling, model codes: 128271 (S, N, G).
- Yanmar 2GM20-B: Marine main engine (domestic use), seawater cooling, model codes: 128271 (A, B, C).
- Yanmar 2GM20C: Saildrive engine, seawater cooling, model code: 128271 E.
- Yanmar 2GM20F: Marine main engine (for export), freshwater cooling, model codes: 128291 (S, N, G) Pdf.
- Yanmar 2GM20FC: Saildrive engine, freshwater cooling.
- Yanmar 2GM20FV: Marine main engine, freshwater cooling, equipped with compact V-drive marine gear KM3V.Pdf
- Yanmar 2GM20FVE
