= Litchfield Municipal Airport (Illinois) =

Airport in Litchfield, Illinois, United States

- IATA: none; ICAO: none; FAA LID: 3LF

Summary
- Airport type: Public
- Owner: Litchfield Airport Authority
- Serves: Litchfield, Illinois
- Time zone: UTC−06:00 (-6)
  - Summer (DST): UTC−05:00 (-5)
- Elevation AMSL: 691 ft / 211 m
- Coordinates: 39°09′45″N 089°40′29″W
- Website: www.litchfieldil.com/airport/

Map
- Location of airport in Illinois 3LF (the United States)

Runways
Direction	Length		Surface
Direction	ft	m	Surface
18/36	4,002	1,220	Asphalt
9/27	3,900	1,189	Asphalt

Statistics (2023)
- Aircraft operations (year ending 3/31/2023): 15,000
- Based aircraft: 26
- Source: FAA, airport website

Litchfield Municipal Airport (FAA LID: 3LF) is a public use airport located two nautical miles (3.7 km) southwest of the central business district of Litchfield, in Montgomery County, Illinois, United States. It is owned by the Litchfield Airport Authority.

The airport is host to a regular airshow that showcases RC planes.

== Facilities and aircraft ==
Litchfield Municipal Airport covers an area of 415 acres (168 ha) at an elevation of 691 feet (211 m) above mean sea level. It has two asphalt paved runways: 18/36 is 4,002 by 75 feet (1,220 x 23 m) (PAPI - REIL) and 9/27 measures 3,900 by 75 feet (1,189 x 23 m) (VASI - REIL).

In 2009, the airport received nearly $800,000 to rehabilitate its runway and extend the runway's useful life.

The airport has a fixed-base operator that sells fuel and offers limited services and amenities such as courtesy transportation, internet, and snooze rooms.

For the 12-month period ending March 31, 2023, the airport had 15,000 aircraft operations, an average of 41 per day: 92% general aviation, 4% air taxi, 4% military. At that time there were 26 aircraft based at this airport: all single-engine.

== Accidents and incidents ==
- On September 10, 2019, a Cessna 337 Skymaster landed gear-up at the Litchfield Municipal Airport.
- On June 11, 2020, a Storm Rally LSA aircraft experienced a nosegear collapse while practicing touch-and-go landings at Litchfield Municipal Airport.
- On August 12, 2023, a Vans RV-14 crashed soon after departing the Litchfield Municipal Airport.

== See also ==
- List of airports in Illinois
