= Sun Fast 31 =

Sailboat class

Development
- Designer: Daniel Andrieu
- Location: France
- Year: 1991
- No. built: 130
- Builder: Jeanneau
- Role: Cruiser-Racer
- Name: Sun Fast 31

Boat
- Displacement: 6,834 lb (3,100 kg)
- Draft: 5.74 ft (1.75 m)

Hull
- Type: monohull
- Construction: fiberglass
- LOA: 30.51 ft (9.30 m)
- LWL: 25.26 ft (7.70 m)
- Beam: 10.60 ft (3.23 m)
- Engine: Yanmar 2GM20 18 hp (13 kW) diesel engine

Hull appendages
- Keel: fin keel
- Ballast: 2,650 lb (1,202 kg)
- Rudder: spade-type rudder

Rig
- Rig type: Bermuda rig
- I foretriangle height: 36.09 ft (11.00 m)
- J foretriangle base: 10.66 ft (3.25 m)
- P mainsail luff: 36.74 ft (11.20 m)
- E mainsail foot: 12.14 ft (3.70 m)

Sails
- Sailplan: fractional rigged sloop
- Mainsail area: 255 sq ft (23.7 m^{2})
- Jib/genoa area: 291 sq ft (27.0 m^{2})
- Spinnaker area: 632 sq ft (58.7 m^{2})
- Upwind sail area: 546 sq ft (50.7 m^{2})
- Downwind sail area: 887 sq ft (82.4 m^{2})

The Sun Fast 31 is a French sailboat that was designed by Daniel Andrieu as a cruiser-racer and first built in 1991.

The Sun Fast 31 is part of the Sun Fast sailboat range.

The design is a development of the Sun Odyssey 31 and the Sun Light 30.

== Production ==
The design was built by Jeanneau in France, from 1991 to 1994, with 130 boats completed, but it is now out of production.

== Design ==
The Sun Fast 31 is a recreational keelboat, built predominantly of fiberglass, with wood trim. It has a 7/8 fractional sloop, with a deck-stepped mast, two sets of swept spreaders and aluminum spars with discontinuous stainless steel wire rigging. The hull has a raked stem, a reverse transom with a swimming platform, an internally mounted spade-type rudder controlled by a tiller and a fixed fin keel, deep draft keel or optional shoal-draft keel. The "performance" fin keel model displaces 6,834 lb (3,100 kg) and carries 2,601 lb (1,180 kg) of lead ballast. The deep draft keel and shoal draft models displace 6,834 lb (3,100 kg) and carry 2,601 lb (1,180 kg) of cast iron ballast.

The "performance" keel model has a draft of 5.74 ft (1.75 m), the deep draft model has a draft of 5.74 ft (1.75 m) but with an L-shaped keel. The shoal draft keel model has a draft of 4.76 ft (1.45 m).

The boat is fitted with a Japanese Yanmar 2GM20 diesel engine of 18 hp (13 kW) for docking and maneuvering. The fuel tank holds 12 U.S. gallons (45 L; 10.0 imp gal) and the fresh water tank has a capacity of 24 U.S. gallons (91 L; 20 imp gal).

The design was built with two interior arrangements, designated "owners" and "team". The owners layout has sleeping accommodation for four people, with a double "V"-berth in the bow cabin, a U-shaped settee around a table in the main cabin and an aft cabin with a double berth on the port side. The galley is located on the port side admidships. The galley has a straight layout and is equipped with a two-burner stove, an ice box and a sink. A navigation station is aft the galley, on the port side. The head is located beside the companionway ladder on the starboard side. Cabin maximum headroom is 73 in (185 cm).

The team cabin version has sleeping accommodation for six people, with a double "V"-berth in the bow cabin, two straight settees in the main cabin and an aft cabin with a double berth on the port side. The galley is located on the port side just forward of the companionway ladder. The galley is L-shaped and is equipped with a two-burner stove, an ice box and a sink. A navigation station is opposite the galley, on the starboard side. The head is located beside the companionway ladder on the starboard side. Cabin maximum headroom is 73 in (185 cm).

For sailing downwind the design may be equipped with a symmetrical spinnaker of 632 sq ft (58.7 m^{2}).

The design has a hull speed of 6.74 kn (12.48 km/h).

== Operational history ==
The boat was at one time supported by a class club that organized racing events, the Sun Fast Association.

== See also ==
- List of sailing boat types
