= Menger Cat 15 =

Sailboat class

Development
- Designer: Bill and Andrew Menger
- Location: United States
- Year: 2001
- Builders: Menger Boatworks; Thompson Boatworks
- Role: Sailing dinghy
- Name: Menger Cat 15

Boat
- Displacement: 700 lb (318 kg)
- Draft: 3.50 ft (1.07 m) with centerboard down

Hull
- Type: monohull
- Construction: fiberglass
- LOA: 15.00 ft (4.57 m)
- LWL: 15.00 ft (4.57 m)
- Beam: 7.00 ft (2.13 m)

Hull appendages
- Keel: centerboard
- Rudder: transom-mounted rudder

Rig
- Rig type: Gaff rigged catboat
- Mast height: 18.00 ft (5.49 m)

Sails
- Sailplan: catboat
- Mainsail area: 145.00 sq ft (13.471 m^{2})
- Total sail area: 145.00 sq ft (13.471 m^{2})

The Menger Cat 15, also called the Menger Cat Daysailer and the Thom Cat 15 Daysailer, is an American sailing dinghy that was designed by Bill Menger and Andrew Menger as a daysailer and first built in 2001.

== Production ==
The design was built by Menger Boatworks in the United States from 2001 until 2004, when the company went out of business. The design was acquired by Thompson Boatworks and remains in production.

== Design ==
The Menger Cat 15 is a recreational sailboat, built predominantly of hand laid-up fiberglass, with teak wooden trim. It is a gaff rigged catboat, with aluminum spars. The hull has a plumb stem, an angled transom, a transom-hung, kick-up rudder controlled by a varnished mahogany tiller and a centerboard. The boat displaces 700 lb (318 kg) and carries no ballast. A white dacron mainsail is standard equipment and an Egyptian cotton sail is optional. Foam flotation is included to make the boat unsinkable. There is also a storage compartment under the foredeck.

The boat has a draft of 3.50 ft (1.07 m) with the centerboard extended and 7 in (18 cm) with it retracted, allowing beaching or ground transportation on a trailer.

The boat may be optionally fitted with a small outboard motor for docking and maneuvering.

== Operational history ==
In a 2000 review naval architect Bob Perry wrote, "the Menger 15 is designed in the style of the old sandbaggers. It is light and beamy with a beautiful hollow entry. The 145 square foot main will give you a sense of power without requiring sandbags to keep the boat on its feet. Coordination between the main and tiller is sometimes required to keep a catboat balanced and this provides a very convenient way to learn about the fine points of rig balance. The long boom will also help you learn the correct way to gybe in a breeze."

== See also ==
- List of sailing boat types
