= George Blackman House =

Historic house in Illinois, United States

- U.S. National Register of Historic Places
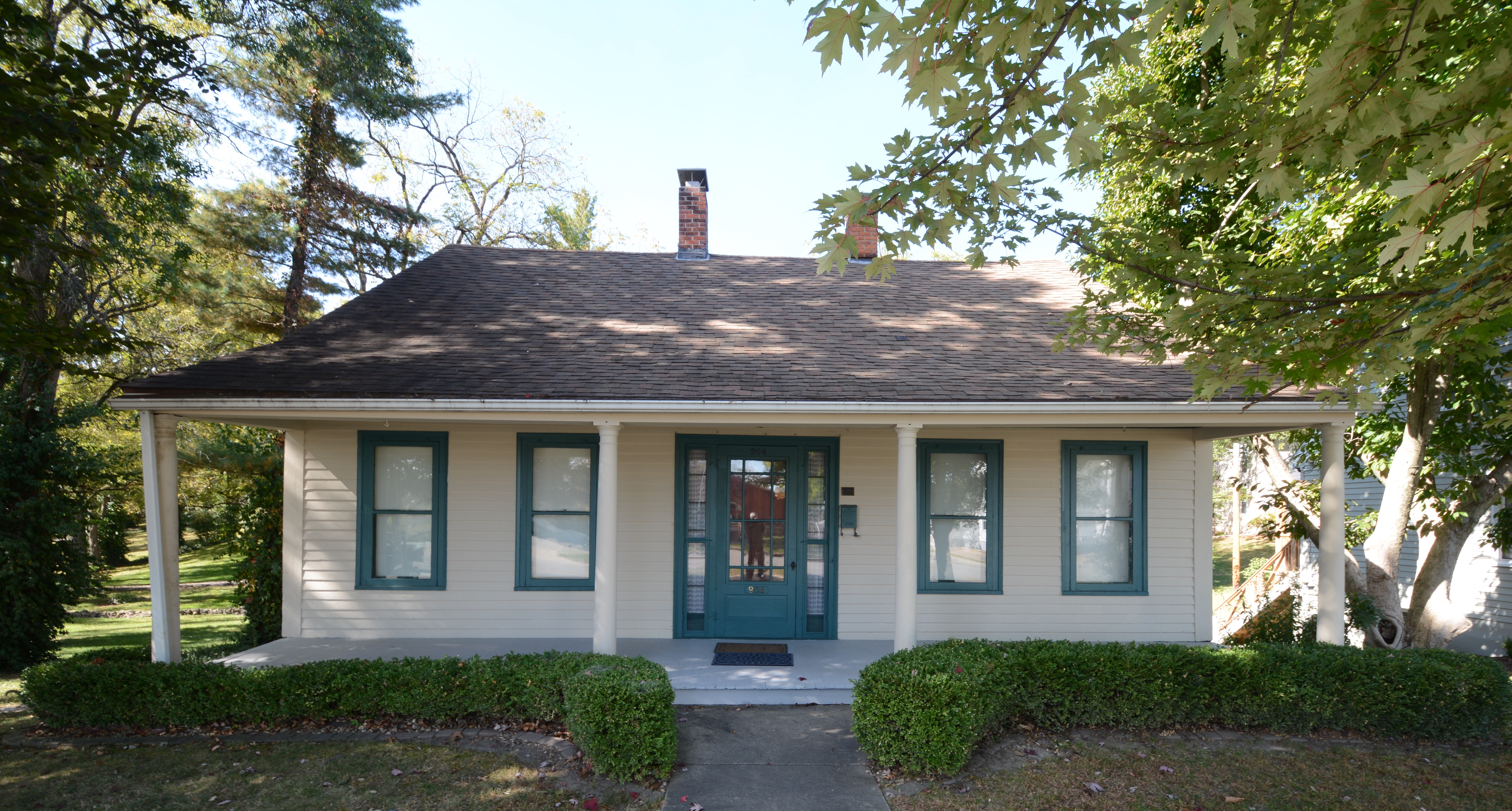

- Location within Illinois Location within the United States
- Location: 904 S. Main St., Hillsboro, Illinois
- Coordinates: 39°9′11″N 89°29′37″W
- Area: 0.5 acres (0.20 ha)
- Built: 1842-43
- Built by: Blackman, George
- Architectural style: Creole style
- NRHP reference No.: 86003180
- Added to NRHP: November 6, 1986

The George Blackman House is a historic house located at 904 S. Main St. in Hillsboro, Illinois. The house was built in 1842-43 by George Blackman, a local blacksmith and woodworker. Blackman designed his house in a style similar to Southern Creole cottages. Such houses had never before been built in Montgomery County, which historically preferred designs inspired by New England architecture, but Blackman's Southern-inspired features were more appropriate for the local climate. The 1 1/2-story house features a recessed open porch supported by thin columns and is topped by a low roof. The house's open floor plan includes six rooms laid out around a central hall.

The house was added to the National Register of Historic Places on November 6, 1986.
