= Lewis H. Thomas House =

Historic house in Illinois, United States

- U.S. National Register of Historic Places
- Location within Illinois Location within the United States
- Nearest city: Virden, Illinois
- Coordinates: 39°30′31″N 89°38′37″W
- Area: 5.1 acres (2.1 ha)
- Built: 1863-65
- Architect: Myers, Elijah E.
- Architectural style: Victorian
- NRHP reference No.: 83003586
- Added to NRHP: December 7, 1983

The Lewis H. Thomas House is a historic house located on North Virden Road near Virden, Illinois. The house was built in 1863-65 for agriculturalist Lewis H. Thomas and formed the centerpiece of his farm. Architect Elijah E. Myers, who also designed three state capitol buildings, planned the Victorian house. Thomas extensively used hedge fencing with bois d'arc on his farm and is considered a pioneer of the technique in Illinois. In addition, his farm was known for its livestock and became a local tourist attraction due to its unusual animals, which included peacocks, bears, and deer. After its roof was lost to a fire, the house was renovated in 1888.

The house was added to the National Register of Historic Places on December 7, 1983.
