= Hayward–Hill House =

Historic house in Illinois, United States

- U.S. National Register of Historic Places
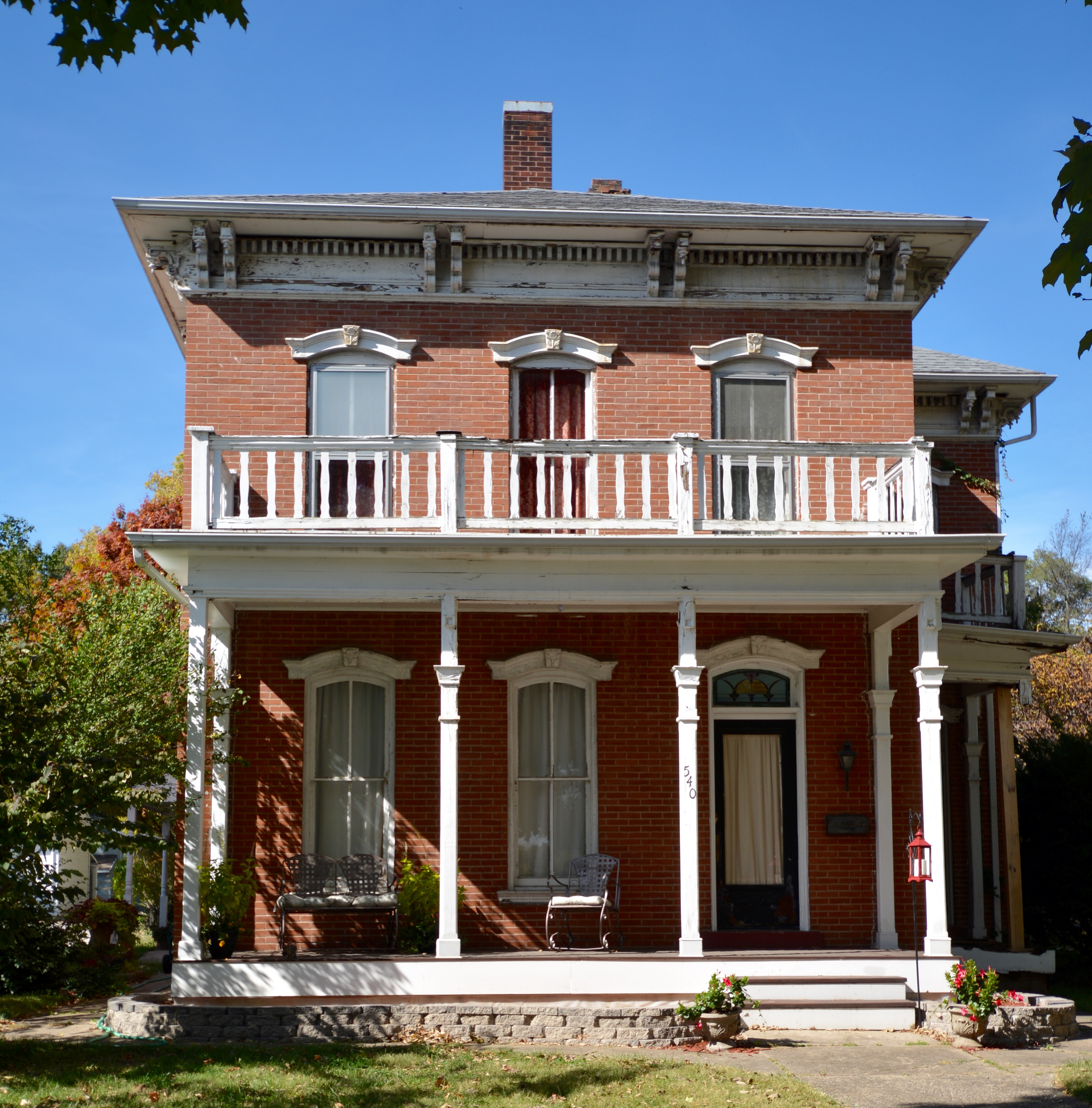

- Location within Illinois Location within the United States
- Location: 540 S. Main St., Hillsboro, Illinois
- Coordinates: 39°9′23″N 89°29′0″W
- Area: less than one acre
- Built: 1850
- Architectural style: Italianate
- NRHP reference No.: 80001399
- Added to NRHP: May 8, 1980

The Hayward–Hill House is a historic house located at 540 S. Main St. in Hillsboro, Illinois. The house was built circa 1850 for John Shaw Hayward, a local businessman and land speculator who founded the Hillsboro Academy. The two-story, L-shaped house has an Italianate design. A verandah, which is topped by a porch with a balustrade, runs along the front of the house. The low hip roof features a cornice with paired brackets along its edge. Cast iron lintels cover the house's tall, narrow arched windows. In 1904, prominent local attorney and financier L. V. Hill purchased the house, which his family owned until 1967.

The house was added to the National Register of Historic Places on May 8, 1980.
