= Fred R. Hayward House =

Historic house in Massachusetts, United States

- U.S. National Register of Historic Places
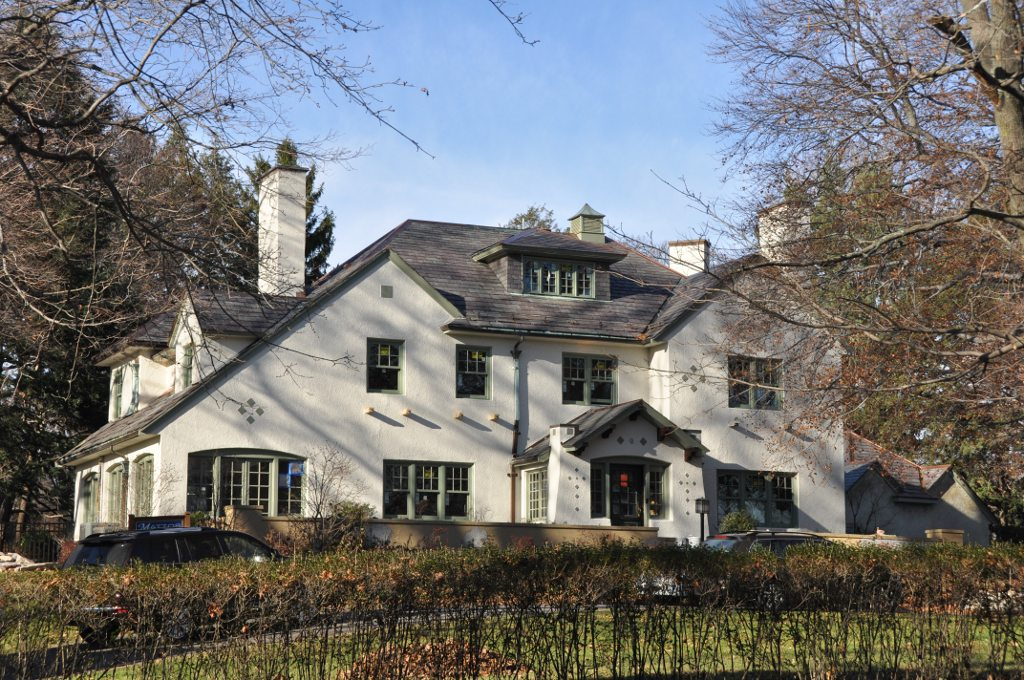

- Location within Massachusetts Location within the United States
- Location: 1547 Centre St., Newton, Massachusetts
- Coordinates: 42°19′20″N 71°12′9″W
- Built: 1912
- Architect: Robert Coit
- Architectural style: Bungalow/Craftsman
- MPS: Newton MRA
- NRHP reference No.: 90000025
- Added to NRHP: February 16, 1990

The Fred R. Hayward House is a historic house at 1547 Centre Street in Newton, Massachusetts. This large 2 1/2-story stucco-clad house was designed by Winchester architect Robert Coit, and built in 1912. Mostly rectangular in its massing with a hip roof, there are two forward-facing gables framing the main entry, the right one projecting slightly. The roof of the left side gable sweeps down to shelter a sunroom. Fred R. Hayward was later the president of the New England Confectionery Company, which had been created by his father in a sequence of mergers.

The house was listed on the National Register of Historic Places in 1990.

== See also ==
- National Register of Historic Places listings in Newton, Massachusetts
