= Litchfield, Illinois =

- City
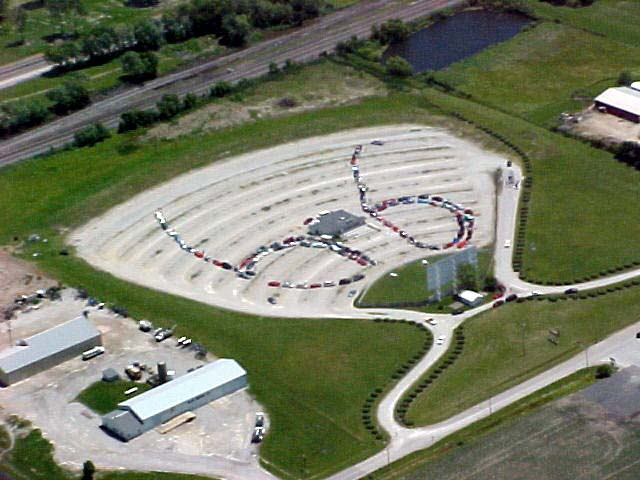
- Cars in a "66" formation at the SkyView Drive-In
- Motto: "Many pleasant surprises!"
- Location in Montgomery County, Illinois
- Coordinates: 39°12′24″N 89°36′40″W
- Country: United States
- State: Illinois
- County: Montgomery
- Townships: North Litchfield, South Litchfield
- Founded: 1856

Area
  - Total: 10.95 sq mi (28.35 km^{2})
  - Land: 8.93 sq mi (23.13 km^{2})
  - Water: 2.02 sq mi (5.23 km^{2})
- Elevation: 663 ft (202 m)

Population (2020)
  - Total: 6,605
  - Density: 739.7/sq mi (285.61/km^{2})
- Time zone: UTC-6 (CST)
  - Summer (DST): UTC-5 (CDT)
- ZIP code: 62056
- Area code: 217
- FIPS code: 17-43965
- GNIS feature ID: 2395731
- Website: www.cityoflitchfieldil.com

Litchfield is a city in Montgomery County, Illinois, United States. The population was 6,605 at the 2020 census. It is located in South Central Illinois, south of Springfield, the state capital.

== History ==
Litchfield was platted in October 1853, and was originally named "Huntsville",

Earlier, Hardinsburg, about 2 miles (3 km) to the southwest, had been founded about 1850. Both towns were created in anticipation of the Terre Haute & Alton Railroad. Hardinsburg grew to about 50 people by 1854; but when it became clear that the railroad was going through Huntsville instead of Hardinsburg, many of the buildings in Hardinsburg were pulled across the prairie on runners to Huntsville beginning in January 1854, and most of the residents moved to the new site as well, becoming Litchfield's first residents. The railroad reached Huntsville in the autumn of 1864, and within two more years Hardinsburg had substantially disappeared.

The new town of Huntsville was renamed in November 1855 after Electus Bachus Litchfield, who with his brothers earlier that year had donated land and convinced the railroad of where to place its shops and terminals.

The residents of Litchfield first voted to incorporate as a village on April 4, 1856. However, the village trustees failed to complete the incorporation; the village charter was dissolved in autumn of 1857 and the trustees closed the books for that village government on January 22, 1858. The state legislature granted a new municipal charter to Litchfield on February 16, 1859, and the first elections under that charter were held on March 7, 1859.

Milnot Company, known for its namesake product, Milnot, an evaporated filled milk, was founded in Litchfield in 1912 as the Litchfield Creamery Company by Martin Jensen. In 1916, a new plant was built at 120 W. St. John St. and operated until 1990. As of 2019, it has been repurposed as an indoor sports training facility.

== Geography ==
Litchfield is in western Montgomery County, 9 miles (14 km) west of Hillsboro, the Montgomery county seat. Interstate 55 runs along the western edge of the city, with access from Exit 52 (Illinois Route 16). I-55 leads north 42 miles (68 km) to Springfield and southwest 53 miles (85 km) to St. Louis. IL 16 passes through Litchfield as Union Avenue, leading east to Hillsboro and southwest 10 miles (16 km) to Gillespie.

According to the U.S. Census Bureau, Litchfield has a total area of 11.0 square miles (28 km^{2}), of which 9.0 square miles (23 km^{2}) are land and 2.0 square miles (5.2 km^{2}), or 18.38%, are water. The city drains east to the West Fork of Shoal Creek, a south-flowing tributary of the Kaskaskia River. Lake Lou Yaeger is a reservoir on the West Fork northeast of the city, and the Litchfield city limits extend north 5 miles (8 km) to encompass most of the reservoir.

== Demographics ==
Historical population
Census	Pop.	Note	%±
1860	1,609		—
1870	3,852		139.4%
1880	4,326		12.3%
1890	5,811		34.3%
1900	5,918		1.8%
1910	5,971		0.9%
1920	6,215		4.1%
1930	6,612		6.4%
1940	7,048		6.6%
1950	7,208		2.3%
1960	7,330		1.7%
1970	7,190		−1.9%
1980	7,204		0.2%
1990	6,883		−4.5%
2000	6,815		−1.0%
2010	6,939		1.8%
2020	6,605		−4.8%
U.S. Decennial Census

=== 2020 census ===
As of the 2020 census, Litchfield had a population of 6,605. The median age was 42.9 years. 22.0% of residents were under the age of 18 and 22.3% of residents were 65 years of age or older. For every 100 females there were 90.3 males, and for every 100 females age 18 and over there were 85.4 males age 18 and over.

93.0% of residents lived in urban areas, while 7.0% lived in rural areas.

There were 2,852 households in Litchfield, of which 25.1% had children under the age of 18 living in them. Of all households, 39.8% were married-couple households, 20.1% were households with a male householder and no spouse or partner present, and 32.0% were households with a female householder and no spouse or partner present. About 35.5% of all households were made up of individuals and 19.7% had someone living alone who was 65 years of age or older.

There were 3,208 housing units, of which 11.1% were vacant. The homeowner vacancy rate was 2.7% and the rental vacancy rate was 8.5%.

Racial composition as of the 2020 census
Race	Number	Percent
White	6,200	93.9%
Black or African American	46	0.7%
American Indian and Alaska Native	9	0.1%
Asian	68	1.0%
Native Hawaiian and Other Pacific Islander	1	0.0%
Some other race	30	0.5%
Two or more races	251	3.8%
Hispanic or Latino (of any race)	135	2.0%

=== Demographic estimates ===
According to U.S. Census Bureau QuickFacts, 7.7% of the population was under the age of 5.

=== Income and poverty ===
The median income for a household was $50,368, and the per capita income in the city was $26,746. 18.2% of the population lived below the poverty line.

=== 2000 Census ===
As of the census of 2000, there were 6,815 people, 2,772 households, and 1,785 families residing in the city. The population density was 1,338.5 inhabitants per square mile (516.8/km^{2}). There were 3,011 housing units at an average density of 591.4 per square mile (228.3/km^{2}). The racial makeup of the city was 98.31% White, 0.37% African American, 0.18% Native American, 0.26% Asian, 0.01% Pacific Islander, 0.22% from other races, and 0.65% from two or more races. Hispanic or Latino of any race were 0.95% of the population.

There were 2,772 households in 2000, out of which 31.3% had children under the age of 18 living with them, 48.7% were married couples living together, 11.9% had a female householder with no husband present, and 35.6% were non-families. 32.5% of all households were made up of individuals, and 17.0% had someone living alone who was 65 years of age or older. The average household size was 2.37 and the average family size was 2.97.

The population is distributed with 25.6% under the age of 18, 7.5% from 18 to 24, 26.6% from 25 to 44, 20.0% from 45 to 64, and 20.3% who were 65 years of age or older. The median age was 38 years. For every 100 females, there were 86.1 males. For every 100 females age 18 and over, there were 80.3 males.

The median income for a household in the city was $28,717, and the median income for a family was $34,139. Males had a median income of $26,238 versus $19,545 for females. The per capita income for the city was $14,612. About 15.7% of families and 16.6% of the population were below the poverty line, including 22.9% of those under age 18 and 11.2% of those age 65 or over.

== Arts and culture ==
=== Attractions ===
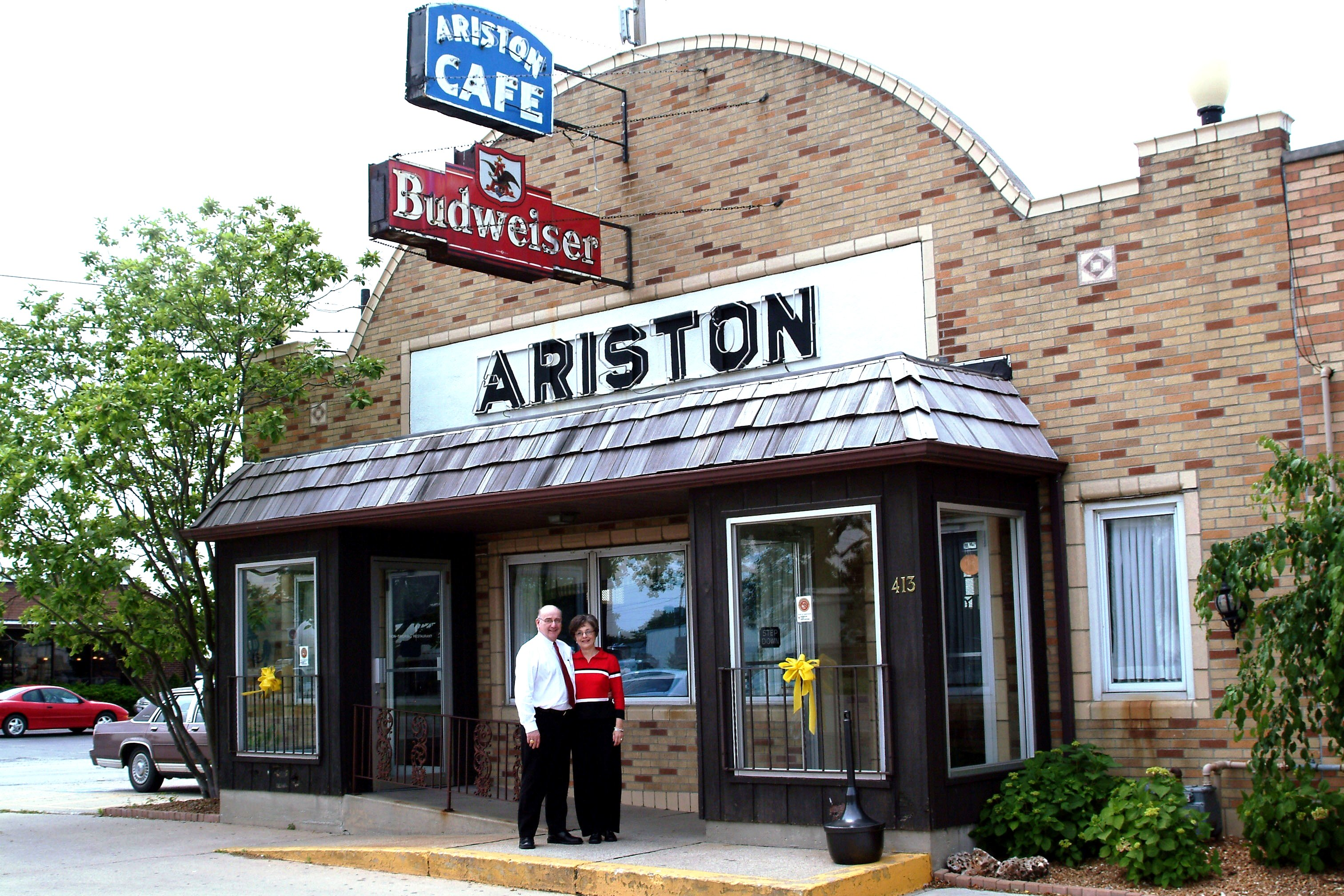
The Ariston Café, a popular stop along U.S. Route 66

The Ariston Café is one of the oldest restaurants along the historic U.S. Route 66, commonly known as Old Route 66, though the café itself claims it is possibly the oldest. The Ariston Café was founded in 1924 in the town of Carlinville, Illinois, but was moved to its present location. The café was inducted into the Route 66 Hall of Fame in 1992. Another landmark is Litchfield's Lake Lou Yaeger, located northeast of town. The Sky View Theater is a member of the Route 66 Hall of Fame and has been in operation since 1950. It is among the last drive-in theaters still operating along Route 66.

In 1934, the Belvidere Motel opened in Litchfield. It is one of the oldest motels around. The grand opening of the Litchfield Museum and Route 66 Welcome Center was June 1, 2013. The museum is located across from the Ariston Café at 334 North Historic Route 66. The museum is owned by the Litchfield Museum and Route 66 Welcome Center Association and is maintained mainly through donations.

== Infrastructure ==
=== Transportation ===
Litchfield Municipal Airport is located 2 nautical miles (3.7 km; 2.3 mi) southwest of the central business district of Litchfield.

Litchfield is served by Interstate 55 and Illinois Route 16.

Two Class 1 railroad lines (Burlington Northern Santa Fe and Norfolk Southern) cross at the south edge of Litchfield after running parallel through town from north to south.

== Notable people ==
- Estella Bagnelle, county superintendent of schools in California
- Stephen D. Canady (1865–1923), Illinois state legislator and businessman
- Luke Epplin, sportswriter; grew up in Litchfield
- Jackie Mayo, professional baseball player for the Philadelphia Phillies
- Paul Martin Pearson, author, governor of Virgin Islands, father of Drew Pearson
- Ray Schalk, Hall of Fame catcher for Chicago White Sox
- Harry C. Stuttle (1879–1947), Illinois state legislator, judge, and lawyer

== See also ==
- Sunshine (magazine), published in Litchfield
