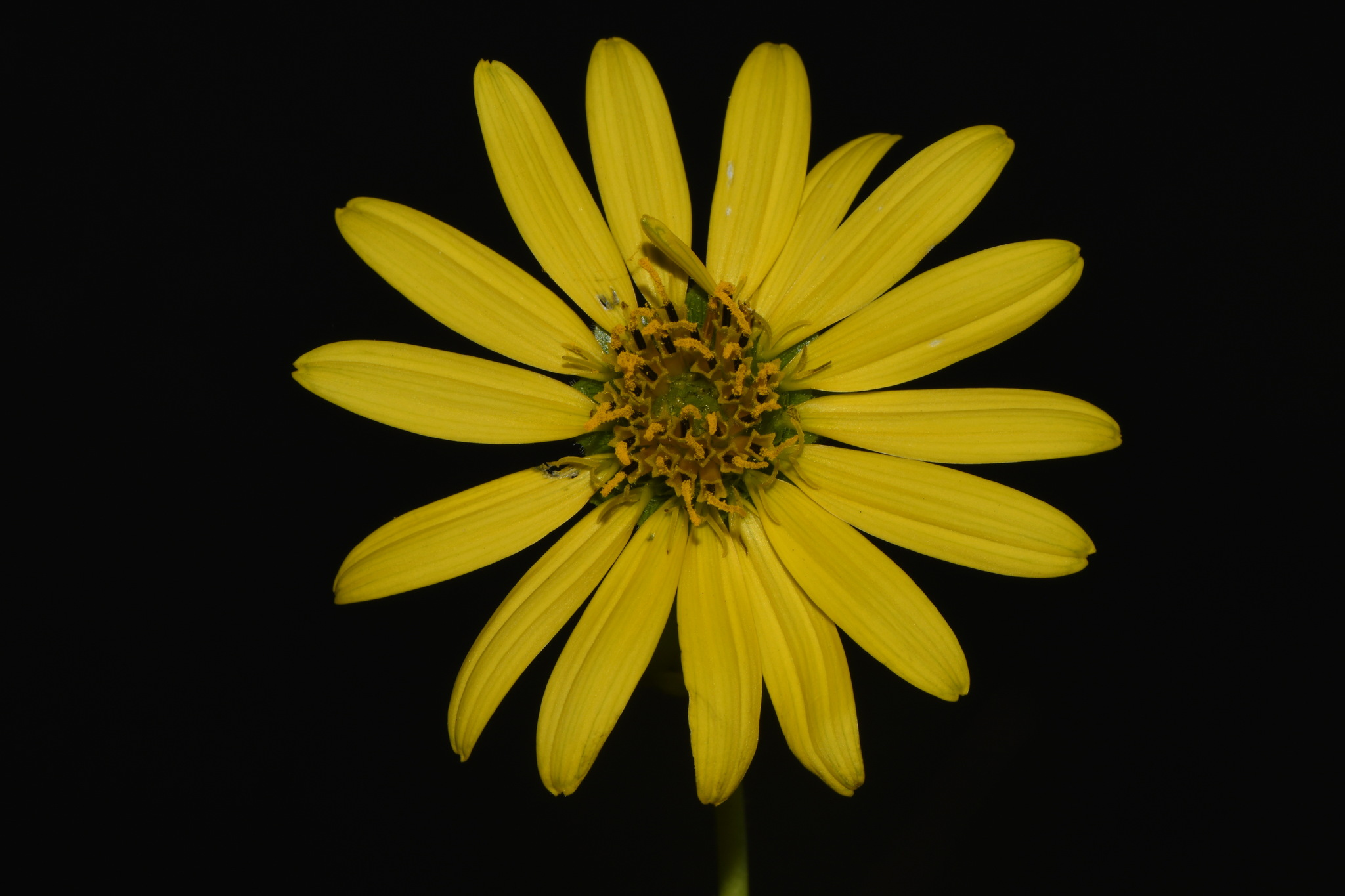

Conservation status
- Critically Imperiled (NatureServe)

Scientific classification
- Kingdom: Plantae
- Clade: Tracheophytes
- Clade: Angiosperms
- Clade: Eudicots
- Clade: Asterids
- Order: Asterales
- Family: Asteraceae
- Tribe: Heliantheae
- Genus: Silphium
- Species: S. perplexum

Binomial name
- Silphium perplexum J.R.Allison

= Silphium perplexum =

Species of plant

Silphium perplexum J.R.Allison is a prairie species in the Asteraceae endemic to the state of Alabama. S. perplexum is commonly known as Old Cahaba rosinweed, a reference to the Cahaba River near which all populations of this species are found.

== Etymology ==
The specific epithet 'perplexum' means perplexing.

== Taxonomy ==
Old Cahaba rosinweed was described in 2001 by the botanist James Robert Allison. The species is thought to have arisen from a hybridization event between Silphium integrifolium Michx. the entire leaf rosinweed and Silphium glutinosum J.R.Allison. the sticky rosinweed. This conclusion was originally based on similarities in the morphology of S. perplexum compared with its putative parent species. In most cases, the morphological characters of S. perplexum are intermediate between that of the parent species Despite S. perplexum having arisen from a hybridization event, it is not appropriate to treat it as a mere hybrid as its distribution does not overlap with either of its parent species. From this it can be concluded that the species is self-sustaining. This means that its existence and future evolution are independent of the fate of its parent species. Furthermore, if Old Cahaba rosinweed were to be characterized as a subspecies or even a variety, this would necessitate choosing if it had more similarities with S. glutinosum or S. integrifolium. At present there is not a clear basis for selecting one over the other. To conclude, because populations of S. perplexum vary little in their morphology, are easy to distinguish from the parent species and occupy non-overlapping areas, there is a strong consensus that S. perplexum is a legitimate species. The ‘lifespan’ of this species (e.g., how long it has existed with few new additions from interspecific hybridization events) has been estimated by studying its distribution compared with its putative parents. Evidence suggests the species could not have formed post 1885 but no lower bounds on its origin have been proposed, therefore its age is uncertain. Tracing the ancestry of S. perplexum is complicated due to it being of hybrid origin. However, the phylogeny of the Silphium genus, including of one of its parent species 'S. integrifolium' (the prairie rosinweed) is understood. S. integrifolium shares a clade with S. wasiotense and S. perfoliatum whilst being more distantly related to S. mohrii.

== Morphology ==
Silphium perplexum is a herbaceous perennial growing to a height of 8 ft (2.4 m), it has short rhizomes. Leaf morphology changes as the plant develops with basal rosette leaves differing from stem leaves. Stem leaves are around 30 cm long and are arranged alternately up the stem. Stem leaves are variable being either ovate or lanceolate, they may attach to the stem directly with auriculate leaf bases. Alternatively, leaves may have short petioles with winged margins resembling leaflets. The leaf margins are usually smooth but may be dentate. Almost the entire above ground surface of the plant is covered in glandular and pubescent trichomes. Glandular trichomes are branched and amber colored, the glands secretions give the plant a resinous texture. Old Cahaba rosinweed has 'stipulate glandular trichomes' which are infrequently found in Silphium except for species such as S. laciniatum and the parent species of S. perplexum, S. glutinosum. This plant develops a basal rosette during its juvenile phase, however, basal leaves are usually lost by the time of flowering. At maturity, stems from one to eight feet are produced which do not branch below the inflorescences. Silphium perplexum flowers from July to October, their flowers are produced in much branched open panicles with each stem holding as many as thirty. The flowers are composite, containing a cluster of fertile disk-florets surrounded by many bright yellow ray-florets averaging around 20 per inflorescence. After pollination, simple dry-fruit are produced, the fruit are characterized as a cypsela along with the fruit of all other Asteraceae. Despite this, they are often incorrectly described as achenes. Old Cahaha rosinweed is often confused with its commoner parent species S. glutinosum. This is due to similarities in their morphology, such as the presence of glandular trichomes on the involucral bracts, leaves and stems. In spite of the similarities, S. perplexum differs from S. glutinosum in several ways. Firstly, S. perplexum has taller stems with more numerous nodes, its leaves are also more lanceolate with shorter petioles and larger blades. Also, flower heads are more elongated and the bracts surrounding the flowers have a more chartaceous (papery) texture. Each flower of S. perplexum contains a greater number of ray-florets than in S. glutinosum and they are of a deeper yellow.

== Growth and reproduction ==
Silphium perplexum can reproduce vegetatively through rhizome growth though the rhizomes are short, so spread slowly. Alternatively, this species can produce large numbers of seeds which are released when the seed heads shatter in autumn. S. perplexum commonly cross-pollinates with other Silphium species in natural environments so is liable to produce hybrid offspring. Hybrids observed include S. anteriscus x S. perplexum.

== Distribution and habitat ==
This species is endemic to only three counties in west-central Alabama, it has an extremely limited distribution with all populations less than 9 miles from the Cahaba River. Old Cahaba rosinweeds favor soils overlying chalk, this contrasts with the parent species S. glutinosum which prefers growing over dolomite or limestone. S. perplexum is most numerous in prairies and openings within scrub and forest. This species is found alongside other tallgrass-prairie plants including grasses such as Andropogon L. spp. and Schizachyrium scoparium (Michx.) Nash. as well as legumes including Desmanthus illinoensis (Michx.) MacMill. ex B.L.Rob. & Fernald. and shrubs including Rosa bracteata J.C.Wendl.

== Conservation ==
Due to this species very restricted range and low population numbers within Alabama it has been listed as an S1 species by ‘Nature serve’. This means that Silphium perplexum is at a high probability of extinction unless conservation action is taken. Despite the recognized threats to this species, S. perplexum is not listed on the U.S. Endangered Species act or the IUCN red list. The lack of conservation attention could be due to uncertainty surrounding S. perplexum's species status.
