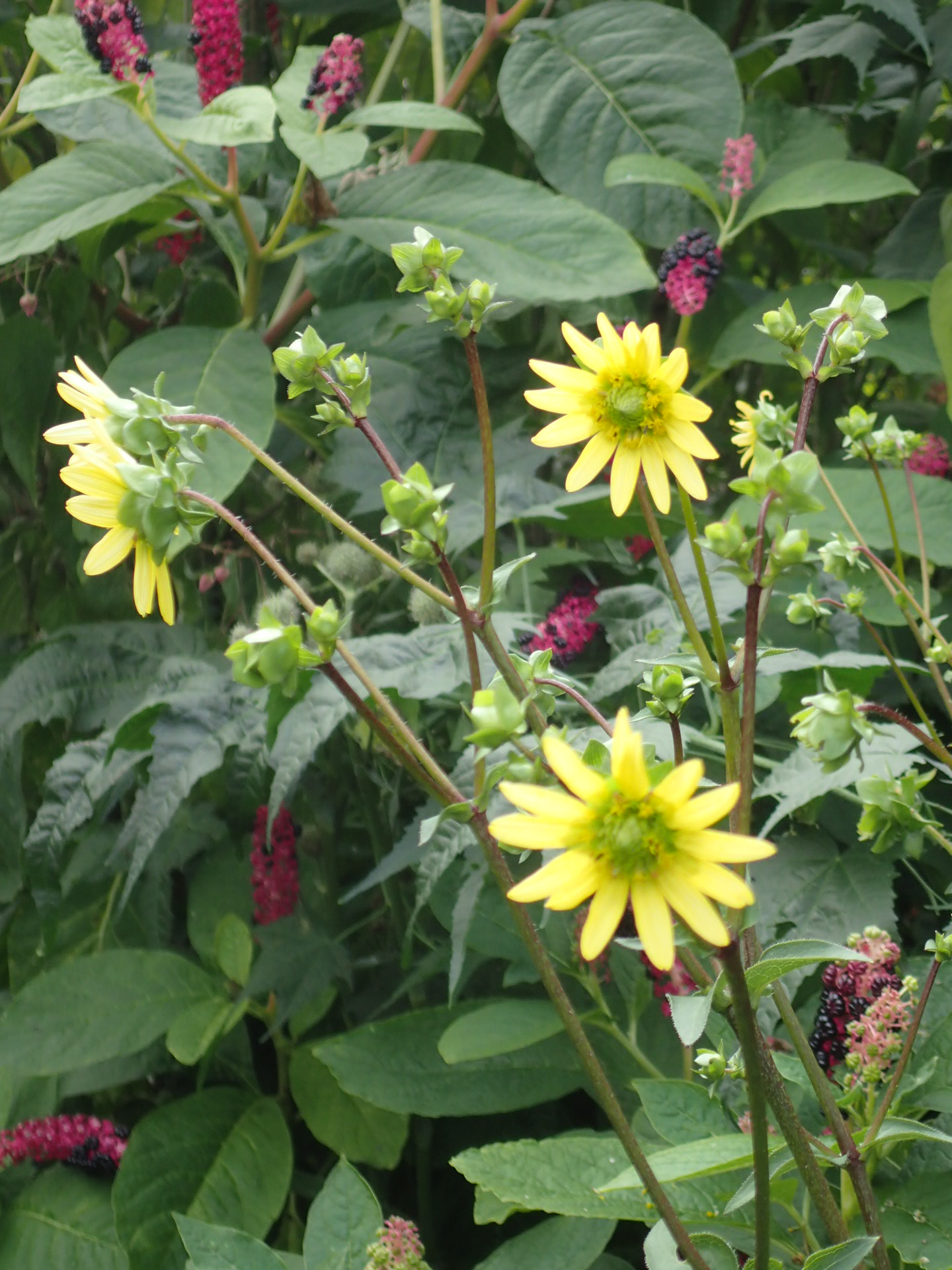

Conservation status
- Vulnerable (NatureServe)

Scientific classification
- Kingdom: Plantae
- Clade: Tracheophytes
- Clade: Angiosperms
- Clade: Eudicots
- Clade: Asterids
- Order: Asterales
- Family: Asteraceae
- Tribe: Heliantheae
- Genus: Silphium
- Species: S. wasiotense

Binomial name
- Silphium wasiotense M.Medley

= Silphium wasiotense =

Species of flowering plant

Silphium wasiotense, commonly called Appalachian rosinweed, is a species of flowering plant in the family Asteraceae. It is native eastern to North America, where it is endemic to the Cumberland Plateau of Kentucky and Tennessee. Its natural habitat is in dry open woodlands. It is considered rare throughout its range.

Silphium wasiotense is an erect herbaceous perennial. It has large, toothed, persistent basal leaves, and similar cauline leaves which are reduced in size up the stem. Silphium wasiotense can be distinguished from the similar looking Silphium brachiatum and Silphium mohrii by its combination of cordate to subcordate leaf bases and hispid stem. It produces yellow flowers in late summer and fall.
