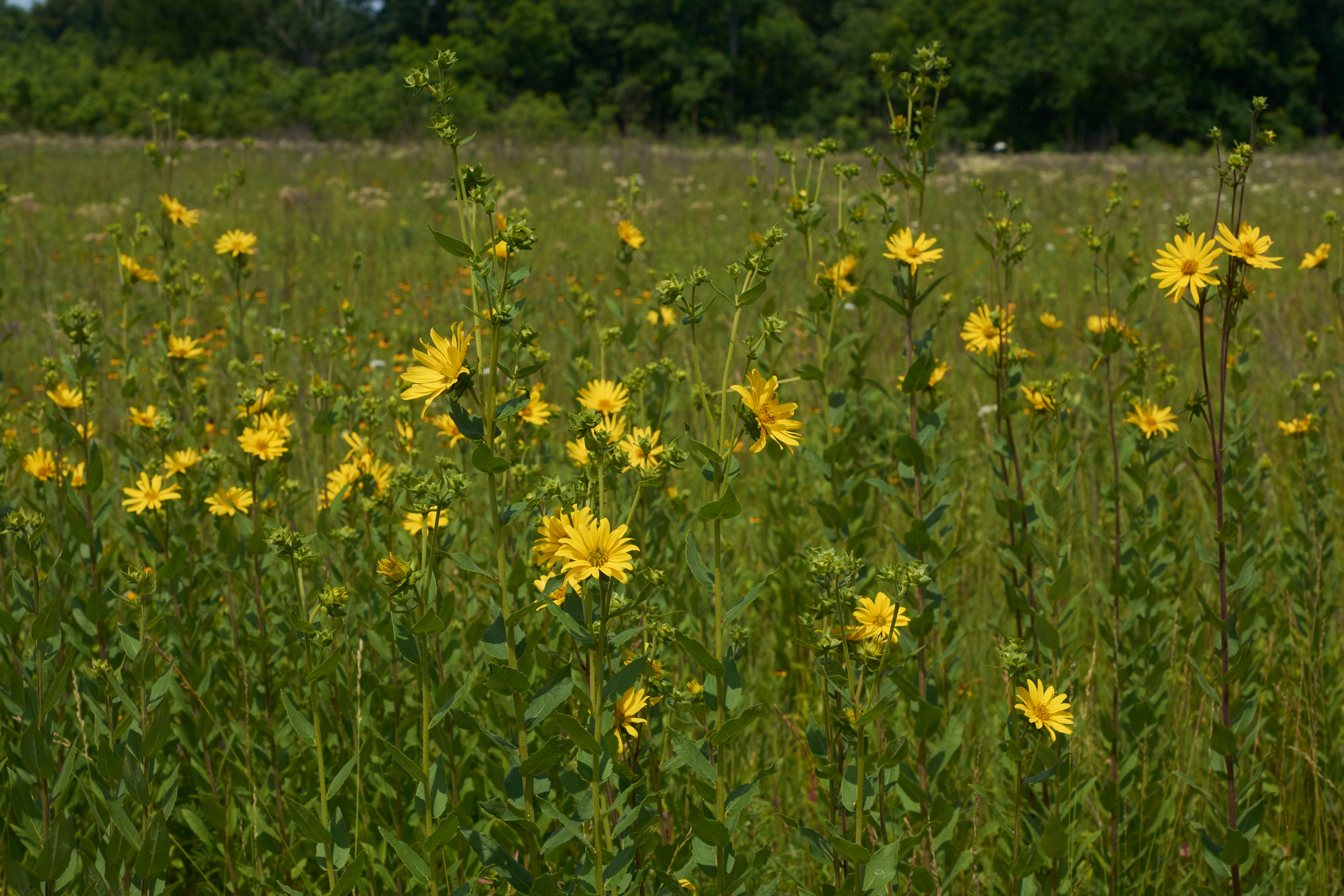

Scientific classification
- Kingdom: Plantae
- Clade: Tracheophytes
- Clade: Angiosperms
- Clade: Eudicots
- Clade: Asterids
- Order: Asterales
- Family: Asteraceae
- Tribe: Heliantheae
- Genus: Silphium
- Species: S. radula

Binomial name
- Silphium radula Nutt.

= Silphium radula =

Species of flowering plant

Silphium radula, commonly known as roughstem rosinweed, is a species of flowering plant in the family Asteraceae. It is native North America, where it is found in the South Central region of the United States. Its natural habitat is prairies over sandy or calcareous soil.

== Description ==
Silphium radula is an herbaceous perennial, growing to around 0.6m tall. It produces large, showy yellow flowers in the summer.

== Taxonomy ==
The taxonomy of the genus Silphium remains unresolved in North America, with the appropriate ranks and relationships between the taxa unclear. Silphium radula appears to be closely related to both Silphium gracile and Silphium integrifolium. Silphium gracile is placed by some authors as a variety of Silphium radula, while other authors treat them as distinct species.

Silphium radula can be distinguished from S. gracile by its shorter peduncles, resulting in its stem leaves often subtending the flower heads (as opposed to flowers being on long naked peduncles as in S. gracile). In addition, S. radula has basal leaves which are absent at flowering time, as opposed to the persistent basal leaves of S. gracile. As for Silphium integrifolium, S. radula can be distinguished from it by having longer stem pubescence, and by the tendency of S. radula to have both alternate and opposite leaves (as opposed to the strictly opposite leaves of S. integrifolium).

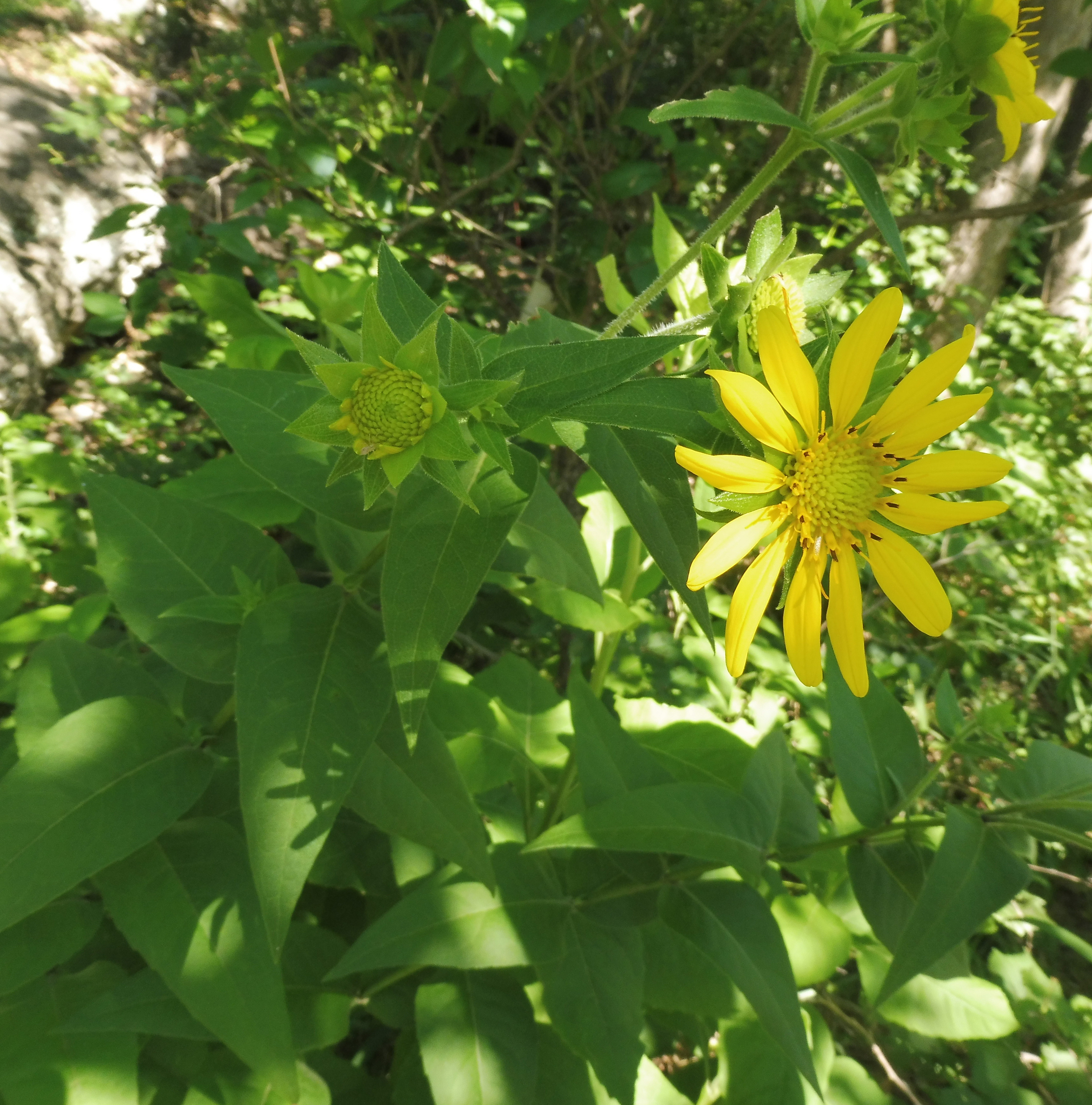
Detail of flowering heads
