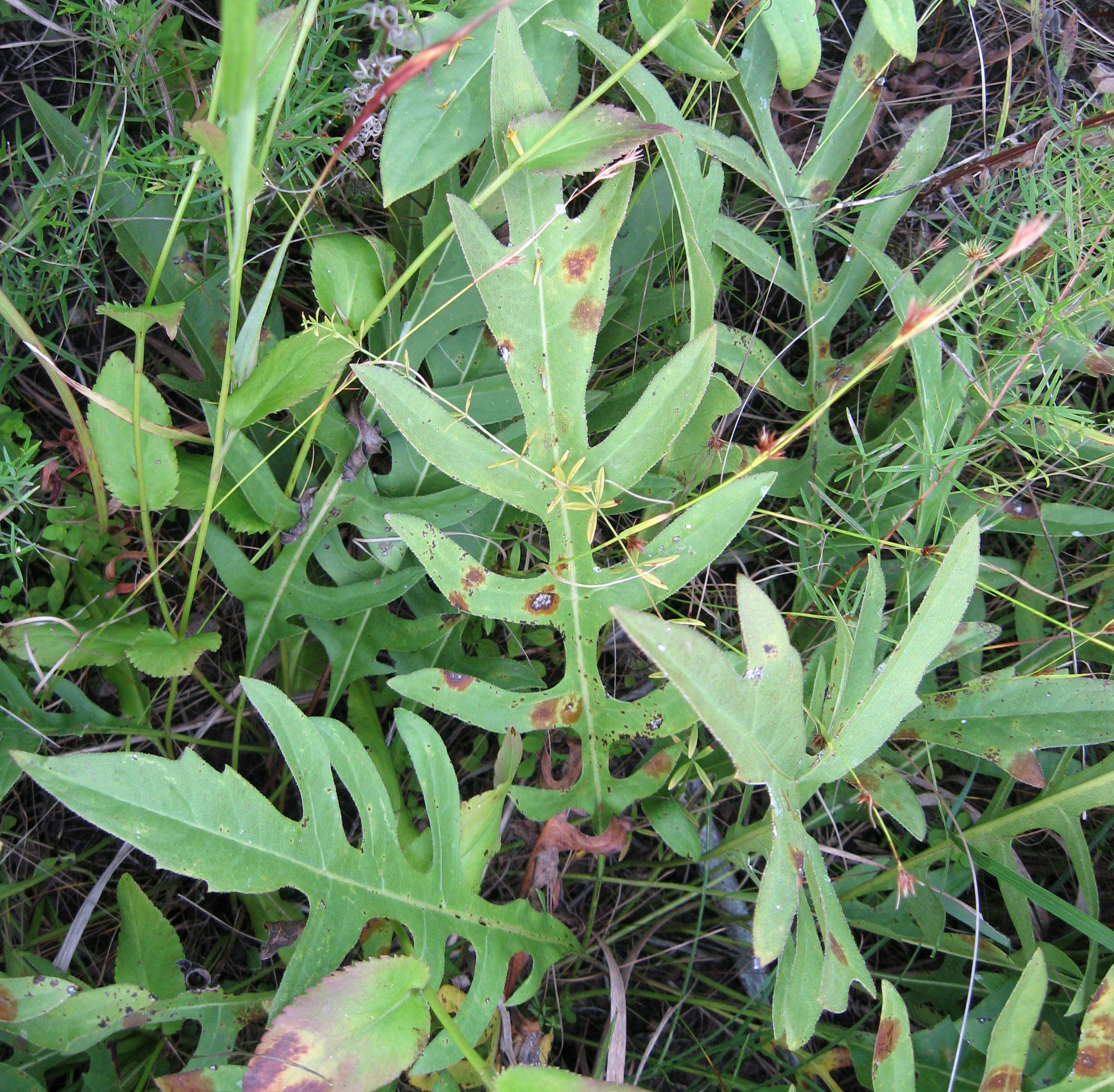

Conservation status
- Vulnerable (NatureServe)

Scientific classification
- Kingdom: Plantae
- Clade: Tracheophytes
- Clade: Angiosperms
- Clade: Eudicots
- Clade: Asterids
- Order: Asterales
- Family: Asteraceae
- Tribe: Heliantheae
- Genus: Silphium
- Species: S. pinnatifidum

Binomial name
- Silphium pinnatifidum Elliott

= Silphium pinnatifidum =

Species of plant

Silphium pinnatifidum, the tansy rosinweed or cutleaf prairie dock, is a species of flowering plant in the family Asteraceae. It is native to the Southeastern United States where it is found in Alabama, Georgia, Kentucky, and Tennessee. Its habitat is prairies, barrens, and cedar glades.

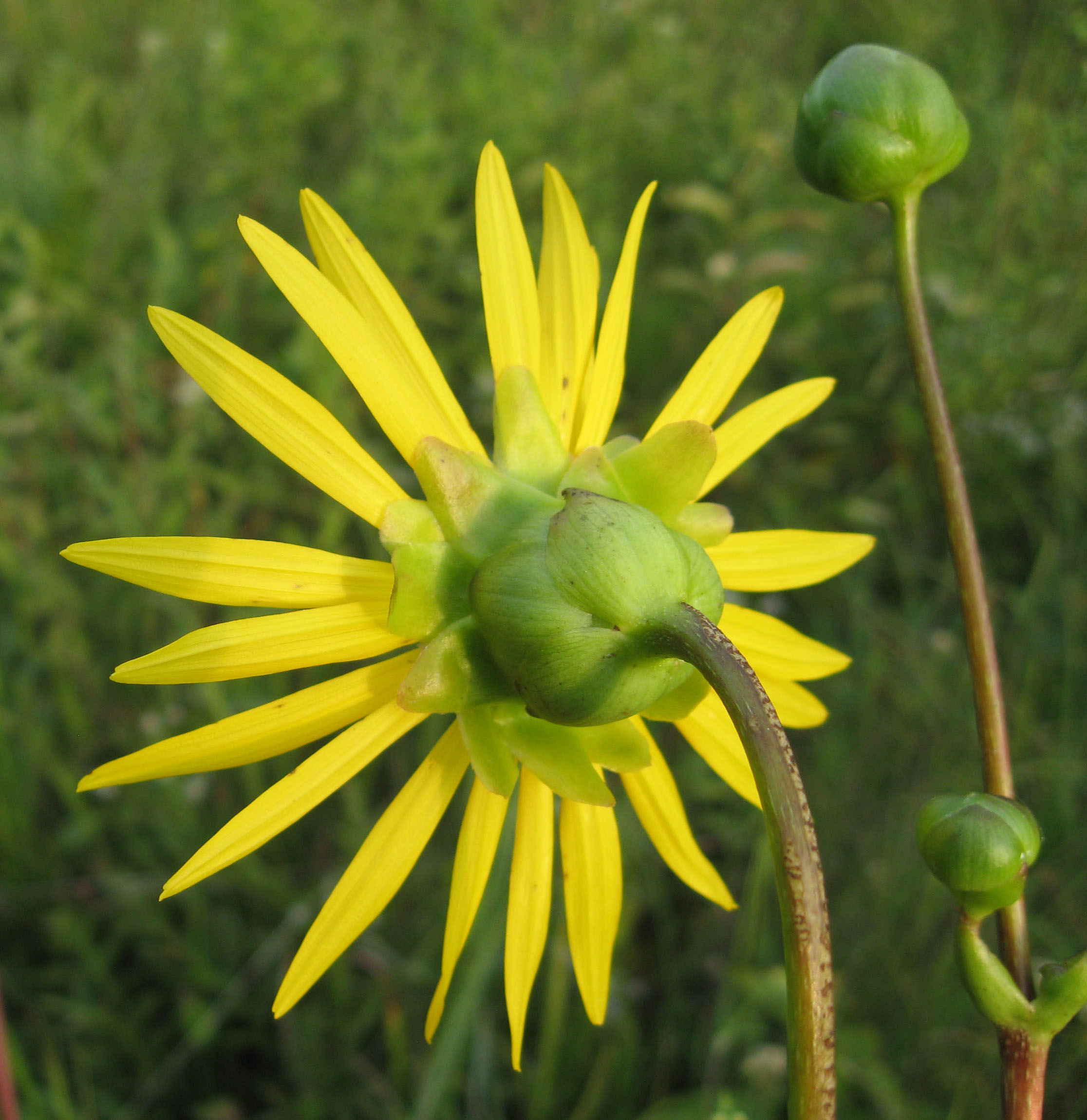
Note the large phyllaries often indicative of Silphium

Because of loss of its fire-dependent habitat, this species is uncommon and is considered vulnerable.

Although most populations are distinct, intermediate populations have been reported between Silphium pinnatifidum and Silphium terebinthinaceum, and some botanists consider S. pinnatifidum only a variety of S. terebinthinaceum. S. pinnatifidum was once thought to be a result of hybridization between Silphium terebinthinaceum and Silphium laciniatum, although molecular studies have indicated that S. pinnatifidum is too closely allied to S. terebinthinaceum for this to be the case.
