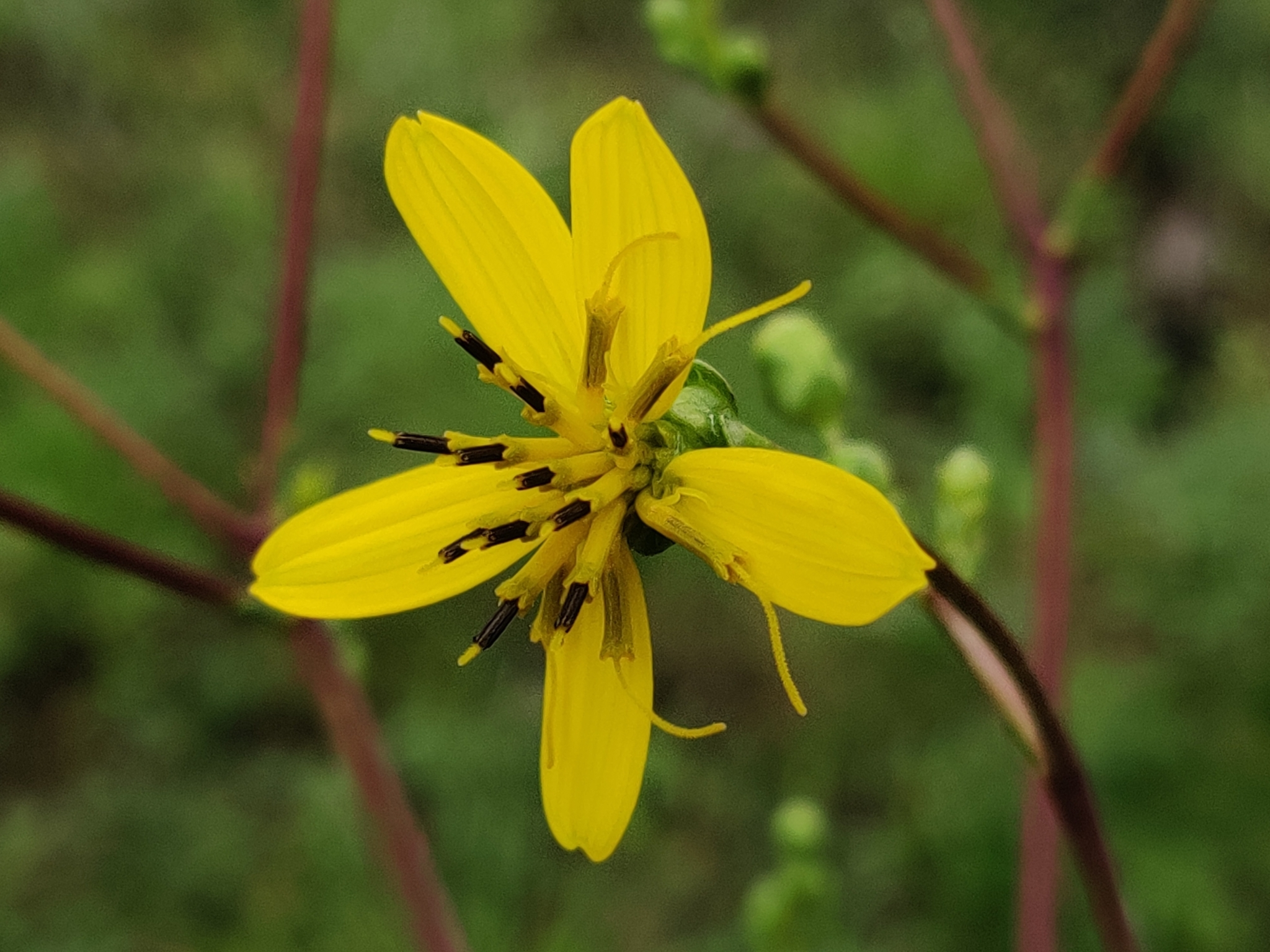

Scientific classification
- Kingdom: Plantae
- Clade: Embryophytes
- Clade: Tracheophytes
- Clade: Angiosperms
- Clade: Eudicots
- Clade: Asterids
- Order: Asterales
- Family: Asteraceae
- Tribe: Heliantheae
- Genus: Silphium
- Species: S. compositum

Binomial name
- Silphium compositum Michx.

= Silphium compositum =

Flowering plant of the southeastern U.S.

Silphium compositum, the kidney-leaf rosinweed, is a flowering plant in the family Asteraceae. A perennial in the Silphium genus, it has yellow flowers and is deciduous. It grows in the southeastern United States. It has divided basal leaves.
