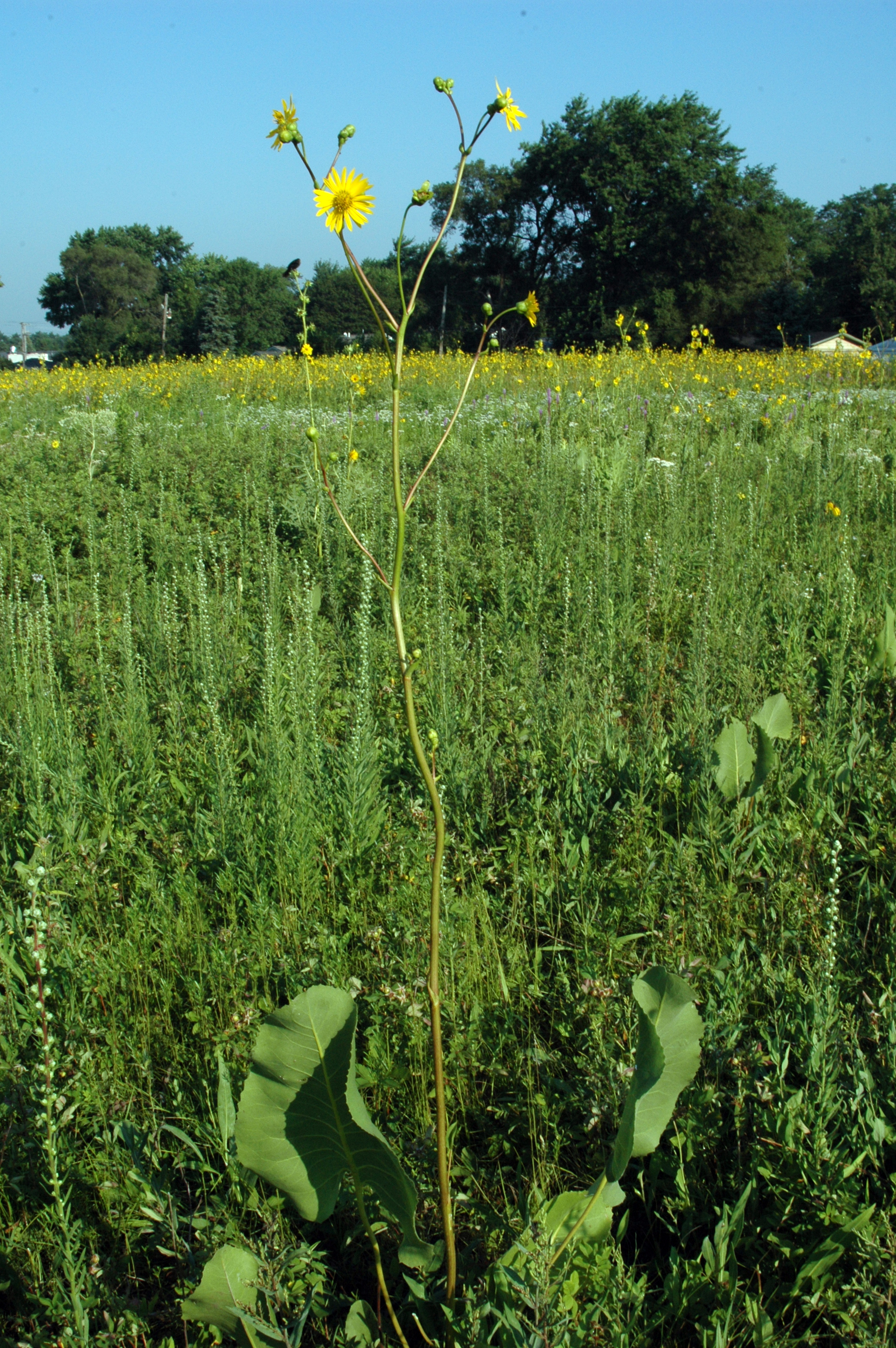

Conservation status
- Apparently Secure (NatureServe)

Scientific classification
- Kingdom: Plantae
- Clade: Tracheophytes
- Clade: Angiosperms
- Clade: Eudicots
- Clade: Asterids
- Order: Asterales
- Family: Asteraceae
- Genus: Silphium
- Species: S. terebinthinaceum

Binomial name
- Silphium terebinthinaceum Jacq.

= Silphium terebinthinaceum =

Species of flowering plant

Silphium terebinthinaceum is a member of the Asteraceae, a family that includes sunflowers, and is commonly referred to as prairie dock or prairie rosinweed. It is native to central and eastern North America. "Rosinweed" became one of the plant's common names due to the fact that upon injury, resin flows from the wound, giving the plant a sweet smell. Tea brewed from the roots of the prairie dock have a variety of medical applications in Native American culture. The smoke from this plant has also been used as a treatment for congestion and rheumatism.

== Description ==
Silphium terebinthinaceum is an herbaceous perennial growing 3 to 10 feet (1 to 3 m) tall. Prairie dock produces small yellow flowers about 2–2 1/2 inches (5–6 cm) in diameter in the summer. The leaves are rough-textured, spade-shaped, and oriented vertically and in a north–south direction, providing special adaptations for survival in the prairie climate. One study found that the majority of prairie dock's leaves were oriented within 15° of North as well as 60° away from the horizontal. The combination of north–south and vertical arrangement seems to provide a mechanism for maintaining lower leaf temperatures at midday, thus conserving water. Additionally, this unique trait grants the plant better access to sunlight for photosynthesis, and consequently provides a more efficient method of producing its carbon resource. This dicot also has a characteristically large taproot able to penetrate to depths of at least 14 feet (4 m) in search of the water table.

== Distribution ==
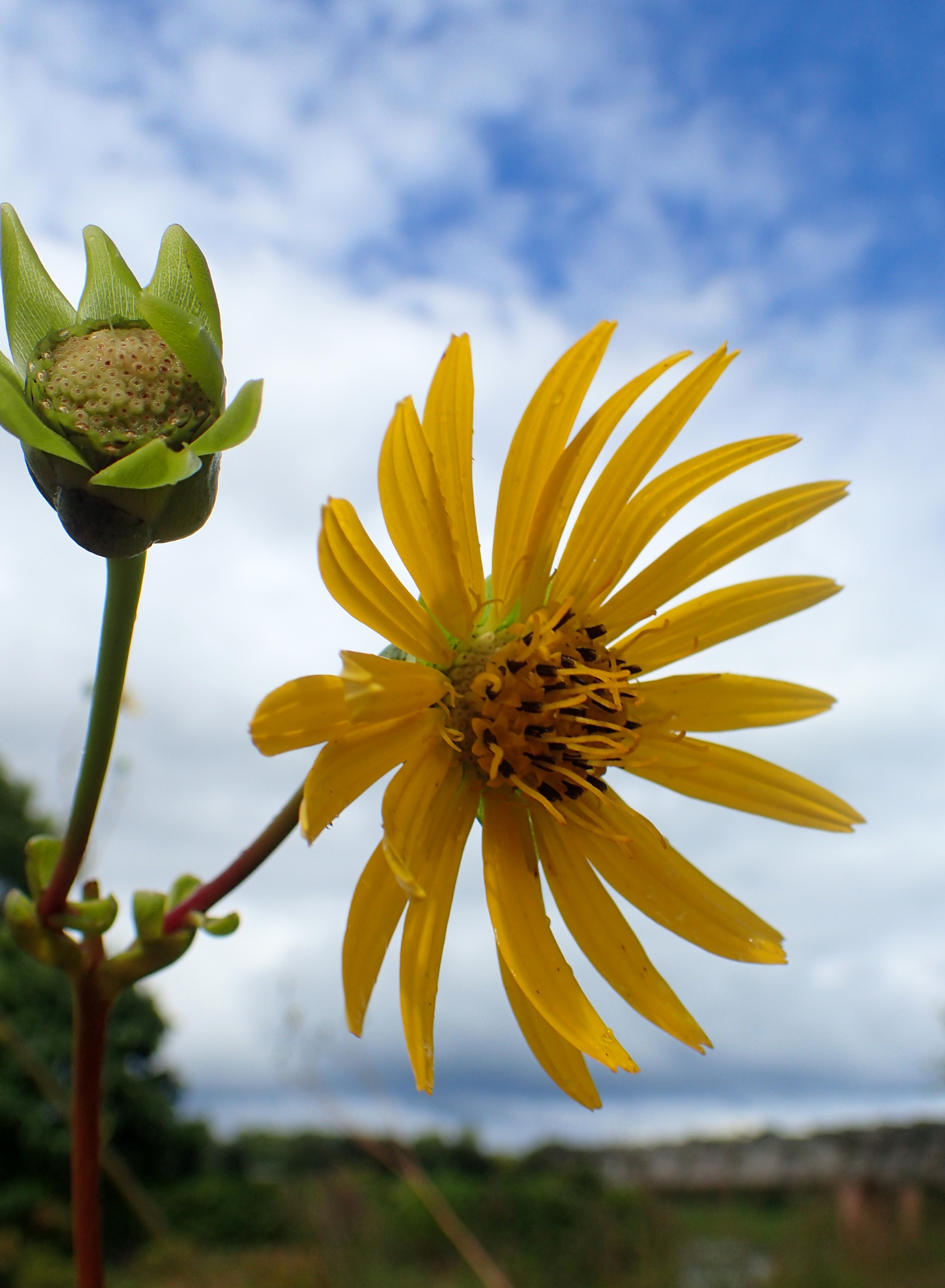
Silphium terebinthinaceum flower

Silphium terebinthinaceum is native in the United States from Iowa, Missouri, and Arkansas to the west, Wisconsin to the north, Virginia to the east, and Mississippi, Alabama, and Georgia to the South. In Canada, it is native to Ontario, although it is critically imperiled. The habitats of S. terebinthinaceum include black soil prairies as well as gravel, shrub, and hill prairies. It also prefers to grow alongside roads and railroads.

== Cultivation ==
Silphium terebinthinaceum prefers full sun. S. terebinthinaceum is a drought-resistant plant that thrives in slightly dry to moist environments. While S. terebinthinaceum prefers deep loamy soils, it is tolerant of soils with gravel and rocks. The plant is slow at developing but is strong and difficult to kill when it is mature. Even though it is a robust plant, harsh conditions may still affect this plant. When there is a drought, a windstorm, or damage to the leaves of the S. terebinthinaceum, patches of brown can develop. Recovery after wildfires occurs quickly, as it has a very deep taproot.

== Ecology ==
Silphium terebinthinaceum can survive destructive events such as grazing and soil degradation because of its ability to produce new above-ground shoots. This plant is also well adapted to obtain and hold onto water due to its characteristically large taproot and large, particularly oriented leaves. Native bees nest beneath or within these plants or use elements of the plants for their nests. Consequently, they are thought to be an important species for attracting bees for pollination in the area. Prairie dock is one of the few species that successfully persists on land that has been converted from prairie to railway.

== Medicinal uses ==
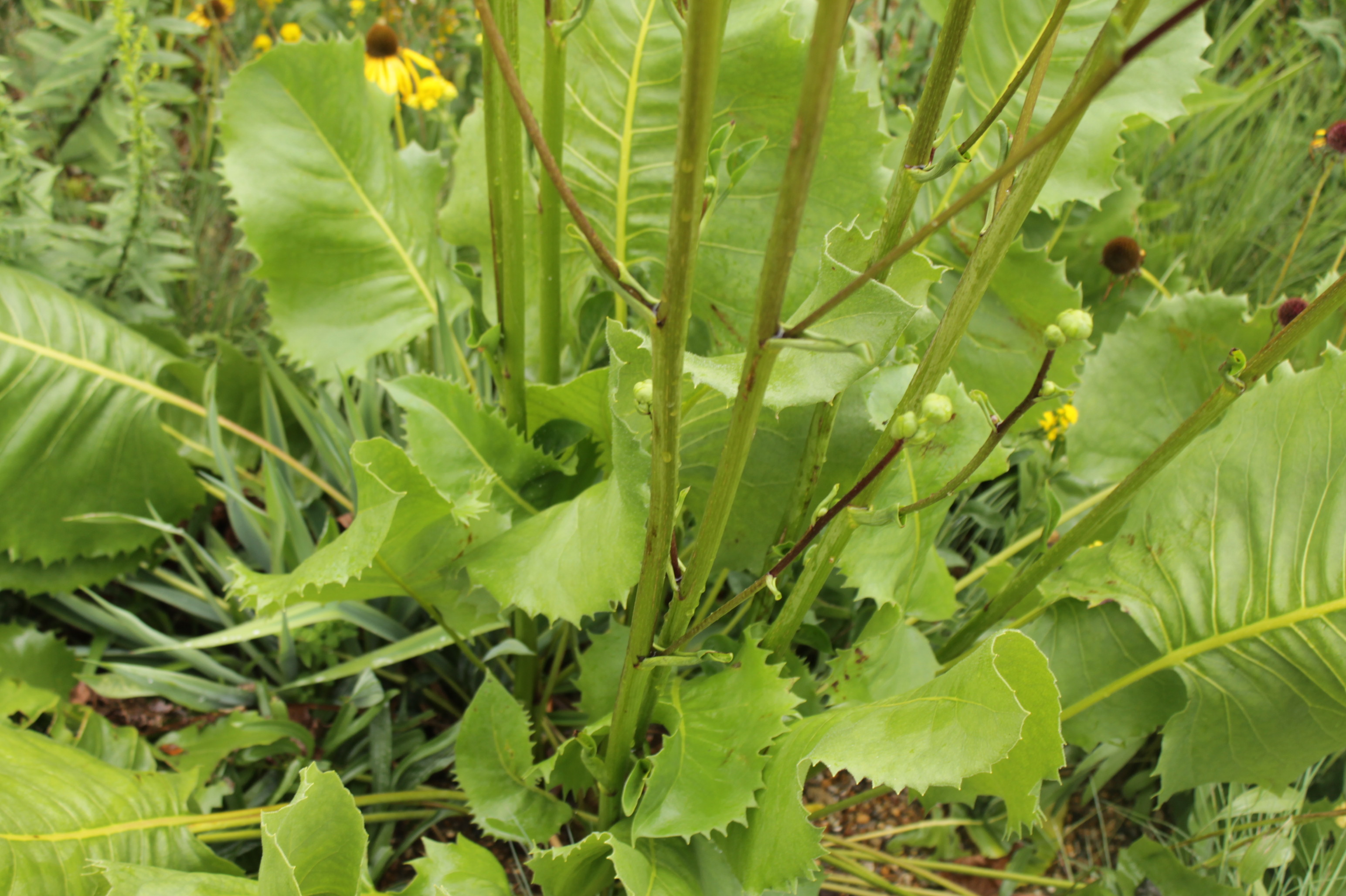
Base leaves of prairie dock (Silphium terebinthinaceum)

Like Silphium perfoliatum (cup plant), S. terebinthinaceum is used as a tea to relieve lung bleeding, to minimize menstruation bleeding, and as an emetic by Native Americans. Other root tea uses include a treatment for liver issues, fever, and enlarged spleen. The smoke from this plant is used as a treatment for nerve pain, along with relieving congestion and rheumatism. However, this plant is considered potentially toxic.
