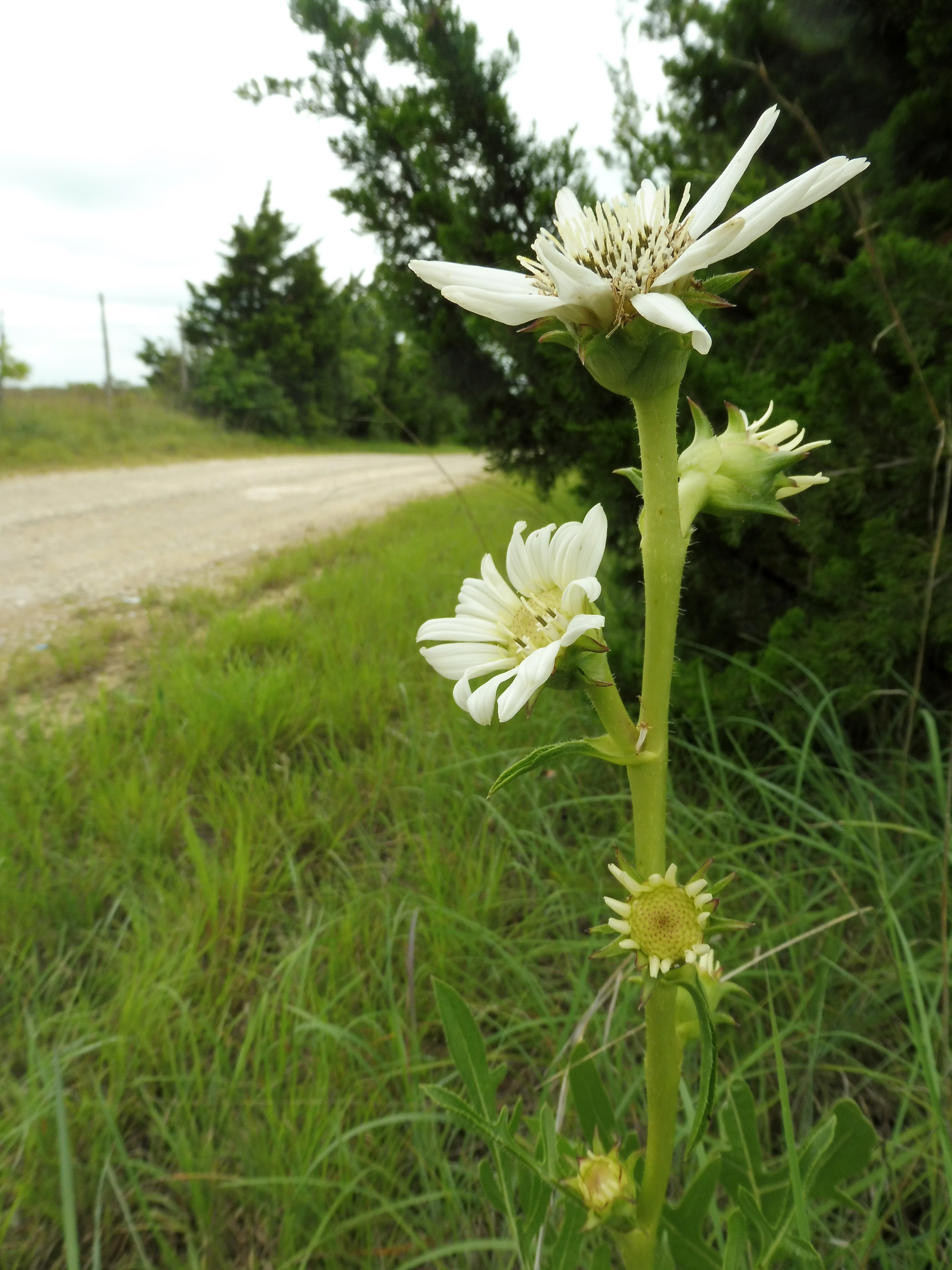

Scientific classification
- Kingdom: Plantae
- Clade: Tracheophytes
- Clade: Angiosperms
- Clade: Eudicots
- Clade: Asterids
- Order: Asterales
- Family: Asteraceae
- Genus: Silphium
- Species: S. albiflorum

Binomial name
- Silphium albiflorum A.Gray

= Silphium albiflorum =

Species of flowering plant

Silphium albiflorum, commonly known as white rosinweed, is a species of flowering plant in the family Asteraceae. It is native to the United States, where it is endemic to the state of Texas. Its natural habitat is in open, calcareous prairies.

It is a tall perennial with rigid, deeply divided leaves. It produces heads of white flowers in late spring through mid-summer. It is a slow growing, but extremely long-lived plant.

Due to its narrow habitat requirements and low population recruitment, it is considered to be a highly conservative species. It fares poorly in areas of suburban development, and faces significant threats in parts of its range.
