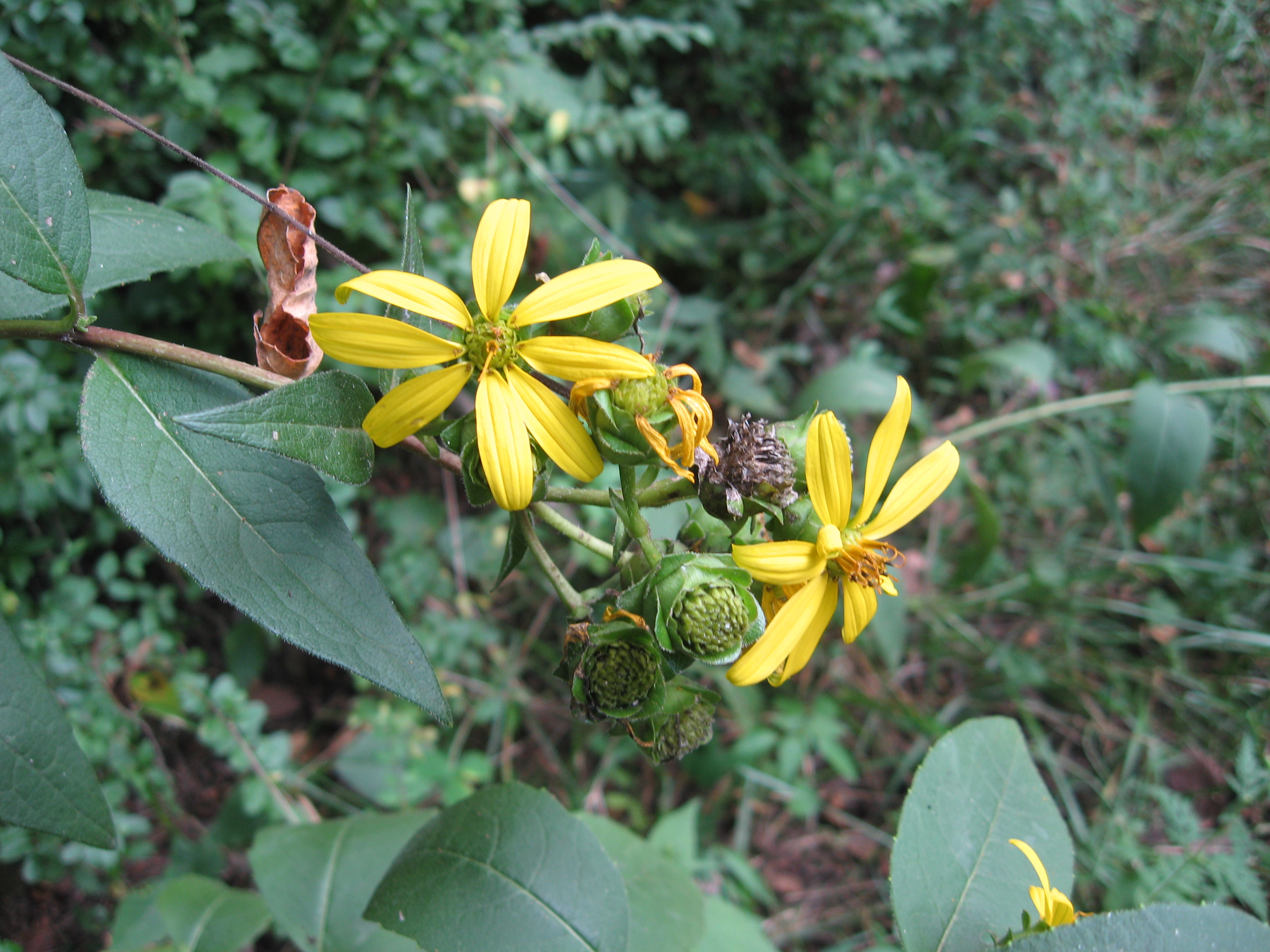
- Silphium asteriscus var. asteriscus

Scientific classification
- Kingdom: Plantae
- Clade: Embryophytes
- Clade: Tracheophytes
- Clade: Spermatophytes
- Clade: Angiosperms
- Clade: Eudicots
- Clade: Asterids
- Order: Asterales
- Family: Asteraceae
- Tribe: Heliantheae
- Genus: Silphium
- Species: S. asteriscus

Binomial name
- Silphium asteriscus L.

= Silphium asteriscus =

Species of flowering plant

Silphium asteriscus, commonly called starry rosinweed, is an herbaceous plant in the family Asteraceae. It is native to the eastern United States, from Oklahoma and Texas east to Florida and Pennsylvania. It is a widespread species found in a variety of open habitats, such as prairies, woodlands, and flatwoods.

== Taxonomy ==
Additional research is needed to better understand the taxonomy of this species. It remains perhaps the most poorly-understood Silphium in eastern North America. It appears to show a high level of local variability throughout its range, which has been interpreted as either a species complex, a single highly variable species, or some combination of both. Due to conflicting information about the best circumscription of the varieties, the taxonomy of this species remains unsettled.

The most recent treatment from 2020 ranked Silphium asperrimum, Silphium dentatum and Silphium simpsonii at species status. If adopted, this leaves S. asteriscus with three remaining varieties. They are:

- Silphium asteriscus var. asteriscus - Appalachian and eastward; with a congested, hispid inflorescence
- Silphium asteriscus var. laitoflium - south and west of the Appalachians; with broad, opposite leaves and a spreading glabrous inflorescence
- Silphium asteriscus var. trifoliatum - widespread; similar to the above but with narrow whorled leaves

== Ecology ==
Silphium asteriscus is insect pollinated and is recorded to have been visited in northern Florida by Agapostemon virescens, Augochloropsis sumptuosa,Ceratina, Halictus poeyi/ligatus, Lasioglossum apopkense, Lasioglossum pectorale, Lasioglossum reticulatum, Megachile albitarsis, Megachile georgica, Megachile mendica, Megachile petulans, Megachile texana, Melissodes tepaneca, Svastra aegis, and Svastra atripes.

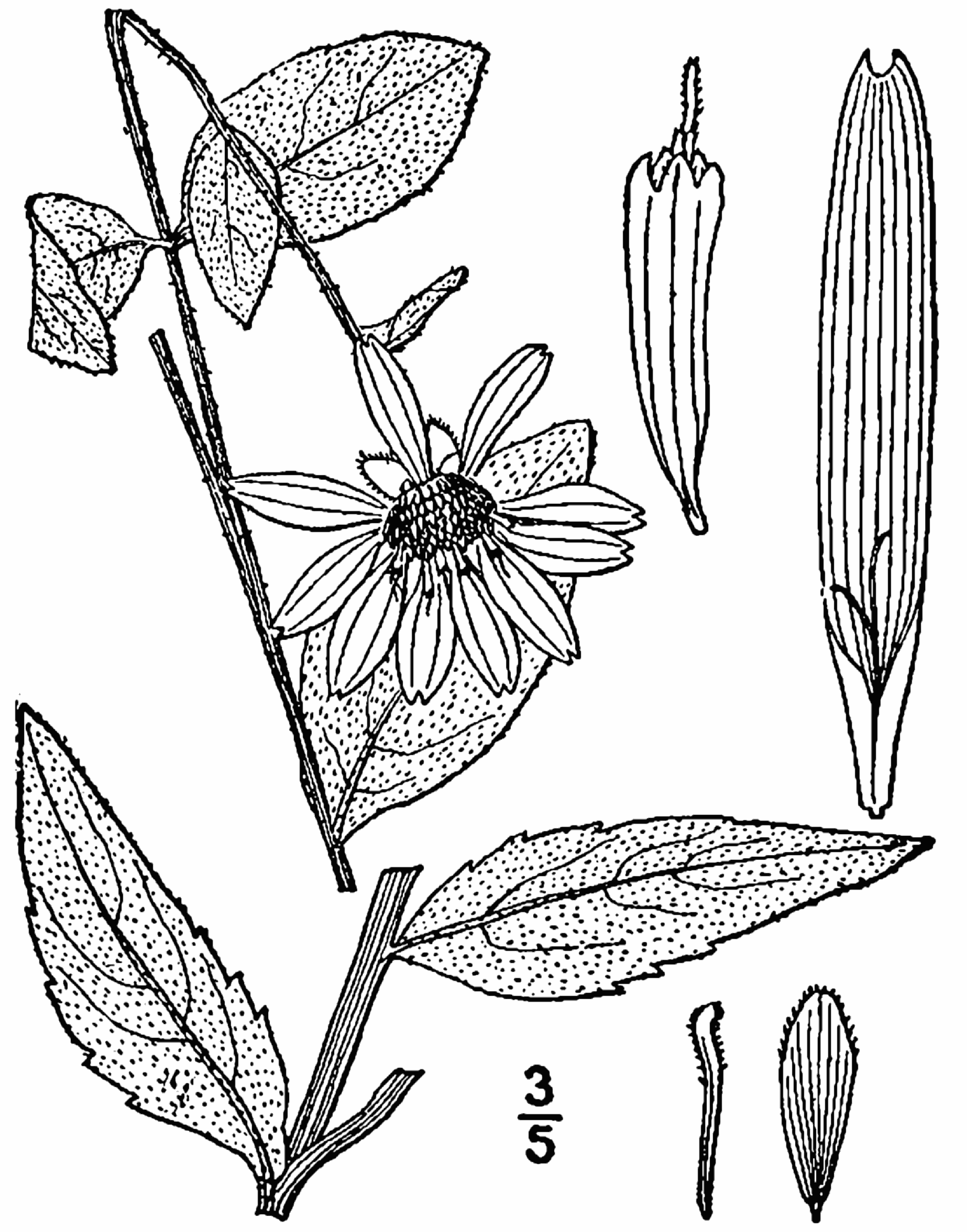
Line drawing of Silphium asteriscus
