= Phyllary =

Botanical term

In botanical terminology, a phyllary, also known as an involucral bract or tegule, is a single bract of the involucre of a composite flower. The involucre is the grouping of bracts together. Phyllaries are reduced leaf-like structures that form one or more whorls immediately below a flower head.

== Function ==
Phyllaries provide protection to developing flowers and fruits. In the dandelion hybrid Taraxacum japonicum × officinale, recurved phyllaries help defend the flowers from herbivory by slugs.

They sometimes assist in the dispersal of fruits. The hooked phyllaries of burdock species (Arctium) cling to the fur and feathers of animals, dispersing the seeds away from the parent plant (exozoochory).

== Structure and arrangement ==
Phyllary morphology is useful in plant identification as between species of the Asteraceae family, they may vary in number, shape, width, length, hairiness, presence of glands, or texture.

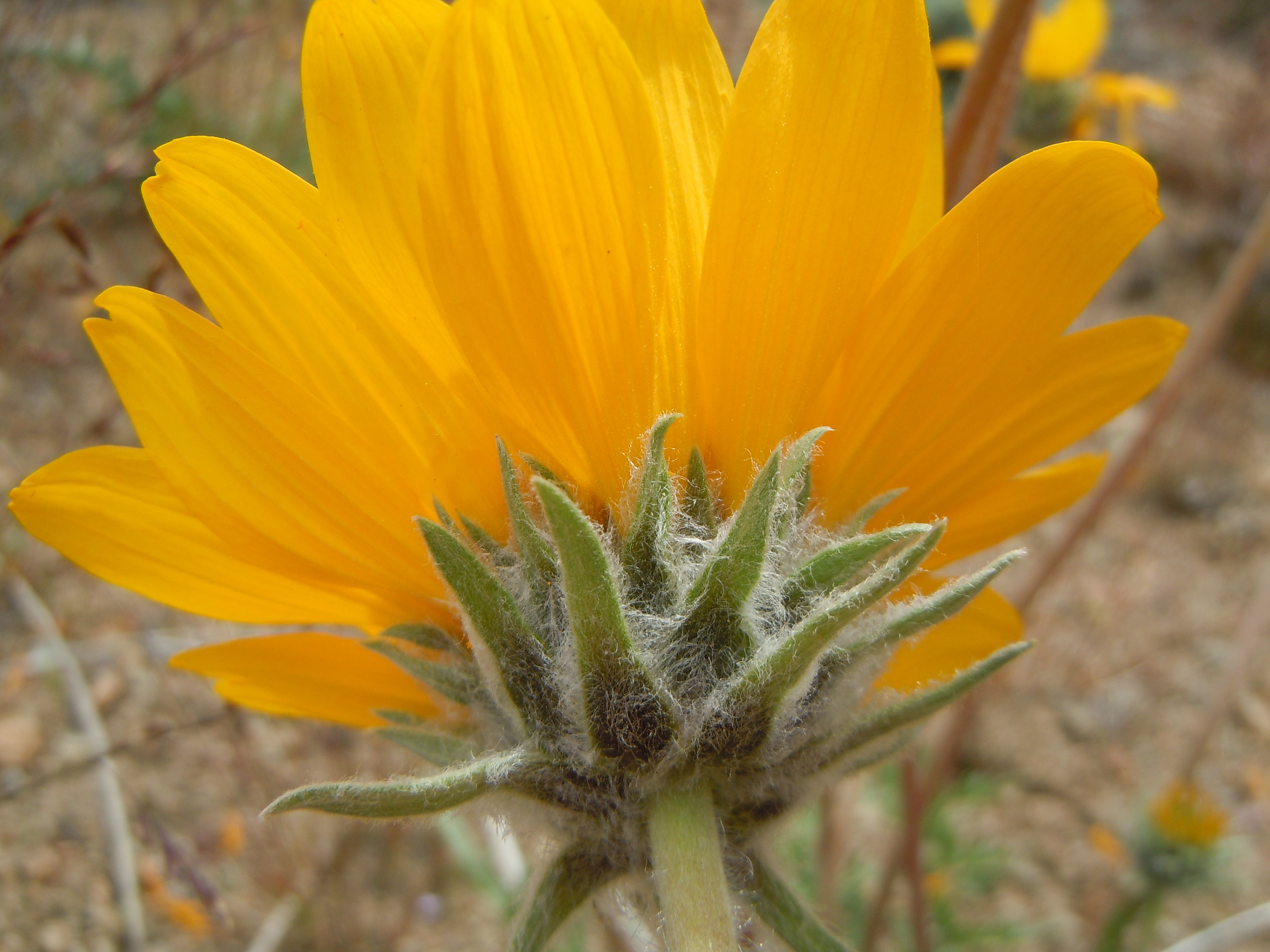
Balsamorhiza hookeri phyllaries are widely separated, hairy, stiff, and point away from the stem.

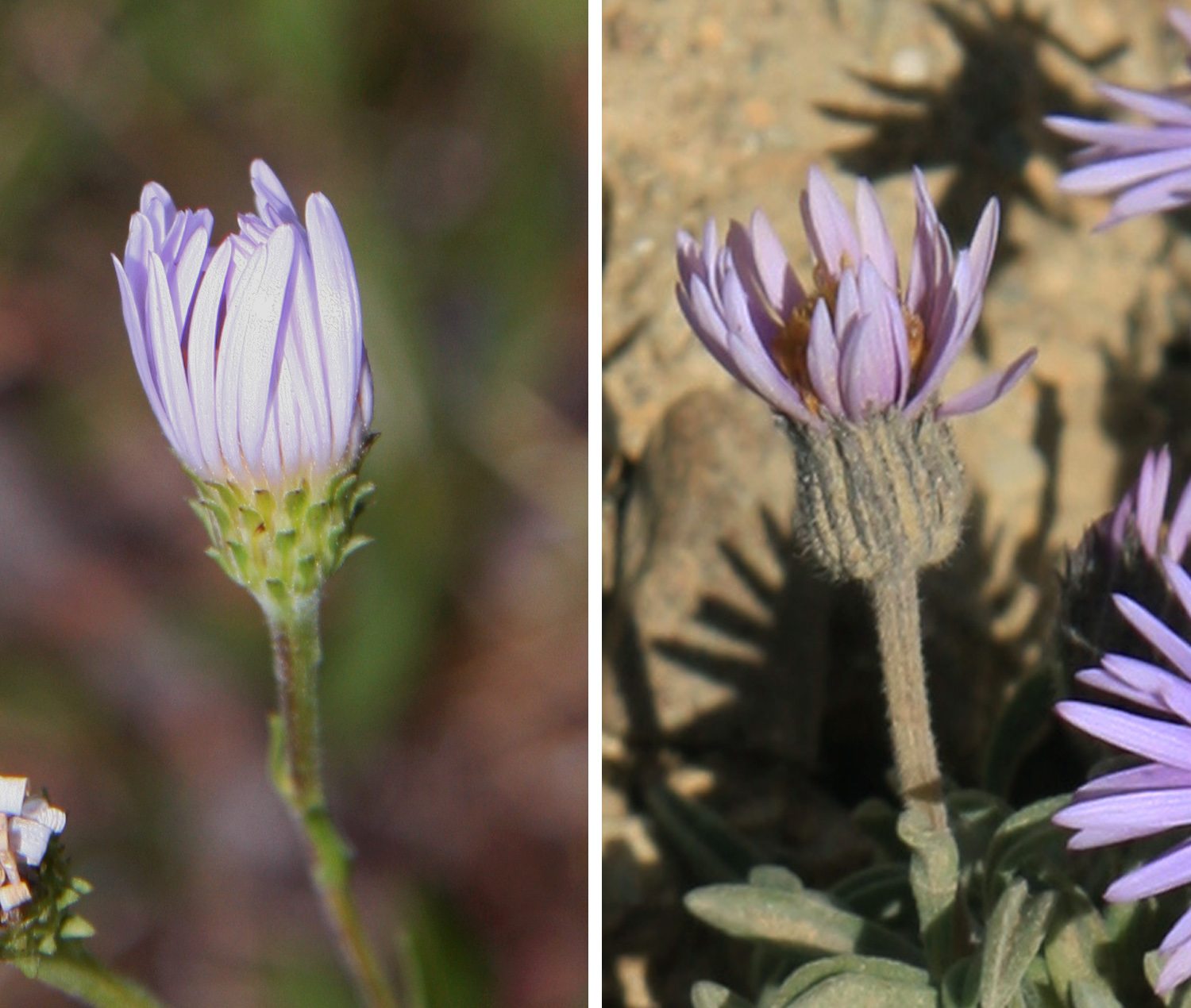
The aster phyllaries (left) are short, curl away from the plant, and are in several layers. The daisy phyllaries (right) are long, hairy, and clasp the base of the flower head.

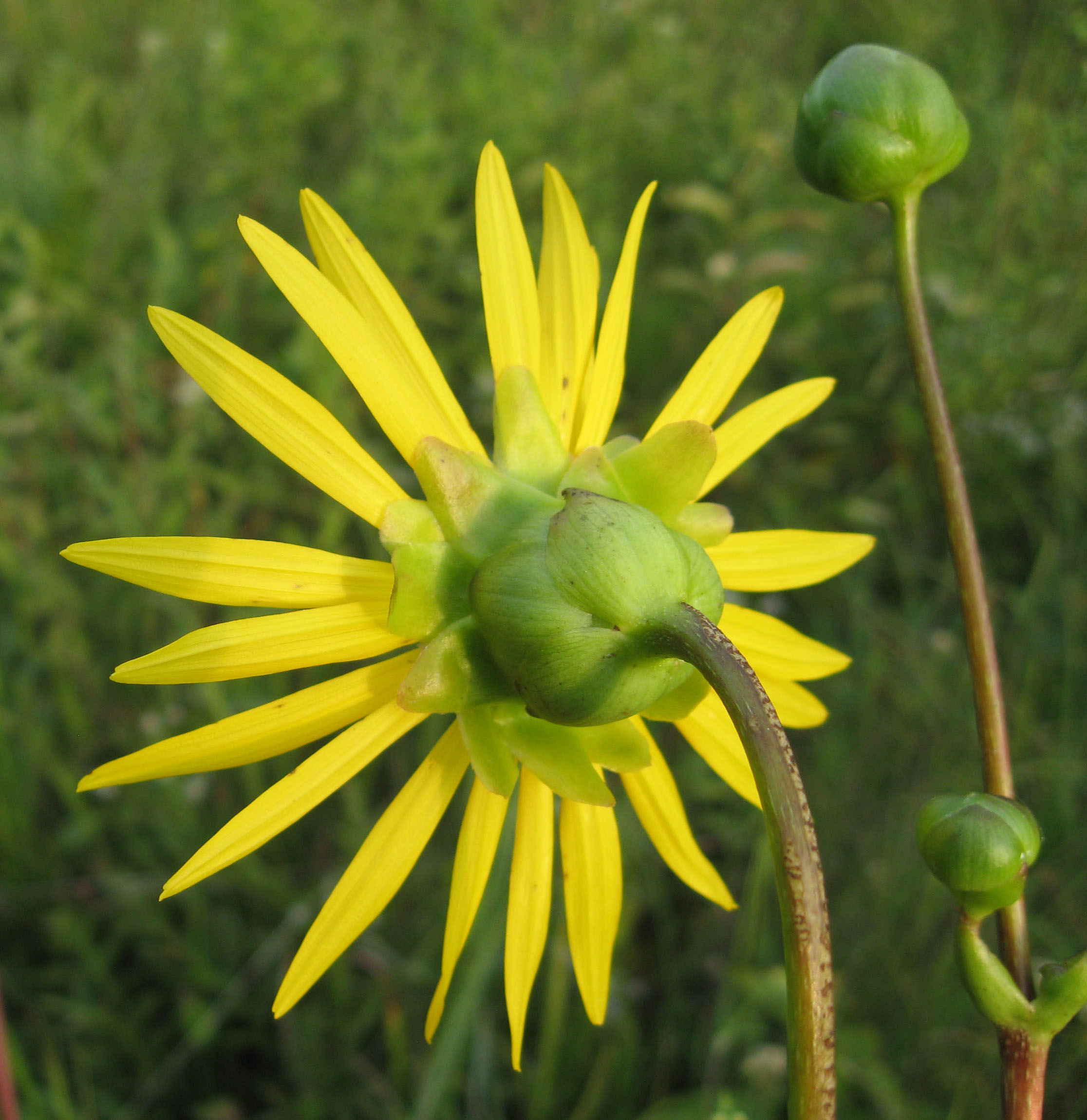
These Silphium pinnatifidum phyllaries are graduated, with those closer to the flower longer than the outer layers.
