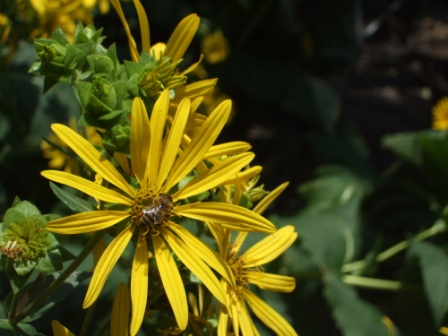
- Silphium integrifolium

Scientific classification
- Kingdom: Plantae
- Clade: Tracheophytes
- Clade: Angiosperms
- Clade: Eudicots
- Clade: Asterids
- Order: Asterales
- Family: Asteraceae
- Subfamily: Asteroideae
- Tribe: Heliantheae
- Subtribe: Engelmanniinae
- Genus: Silphium; L.

Type species
- Silphium asteriscus L.

= Silphium (genus) =

Genus of plants

Silphium is a genus of North American plants in the tribe Heliantheae within the family Asteraceae.

Members of the genus, commonly known as rosinweeds, are herbaceous perennial plants growing to 0.2 m (8 in) to more than 2.5 m (8 ft 2 in) tall, with yellow (rarely white) flowerheads that resemble sunflowers. In the rosinweeds, the ray florets in the head are female and the disc florets are male; this differs from sunflowers, where ray florets are sterile and disc florets are perfect, capable of producing both pollen and seeds.

The name of the genus comes from the Ancient Greek word for a North African plant whose identity has been lost, though it is known its gum or juice was prized by the ancients as a medicine and a condiment.

== Species ==
Species in the genus include:

- Silphium albiflorum A.Gray – white rosinweed – TX
- Silphium asteriscus L. – starry rosinweed – TX OK LA AR MO IL IN KY TN AL MS GA FL SC NC VA WV OH MD PA NY
- Silphium brachiatum Gatt. – Cumberland rosinweed – TN AL GA
- Silphium compositum Michx. – kidneyleaf rosinweed – TN AL GA FL SC NC VA WV
- Silphium glutinosum J.R. Allison AL
- Silphium integrifolium Michx. – wholeleaf rosinweed – NM TX LA OK AR MO KS CO WY SD NE IA IL IN KY TN MS AL WI MI MA ONT
- Silphium laciniatum L. – compassplant – NM TX LA OK AR MO KS CO SD NE MN IA IL IN KY TN MS AL WI MI VA PA NY ONT
- Silphium laeve Hook.
- Silphium mohrii Small – Mohr's rosinweed – TN AL GA
- Silphium perfoliatum L. – cup plant – NM TX LA OK AR MO KS CO SD ND NE MN IA IL INKY TN MS AL WI MI NC VA DE PA NY NJ CT RI MA VT NH ME ONT QUE NB
- Silphium perplexum J.R.Allison – Old Cahaba rosinweed – AL
- Silphium pinnatifidum Elliott – Cutleaf prairie dock – AL GA KY TN
- Silphium radula Nutt. – roughstem rosinweed – KS MO AR OK TX LA
- Silphium terebinthinaceum Jacq. – prairie rosinweed, prairie dock – IA MO AR MS AL GA SC NC VA WV TN KY OH IN IL WI MI NY ONT
- Silphium ternatum Sessé & Moc. – Mexico
- Silphium trifoliatum L. – whorled rosinweed – AL GA IN KY MD NC SC OH PA VA WV
- Silphium wasiotense M.Medley – Appalachian rosinweed – KY TN
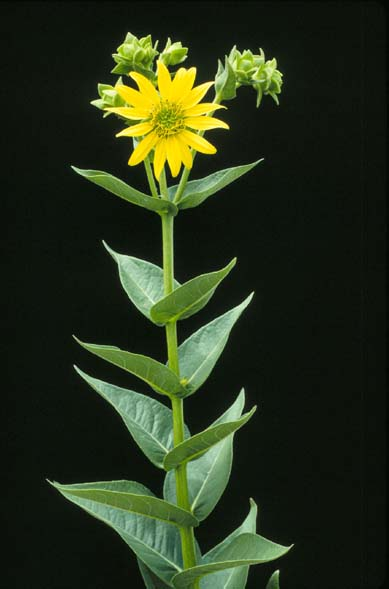
Silphium integrifolium (rosinweed) flowers

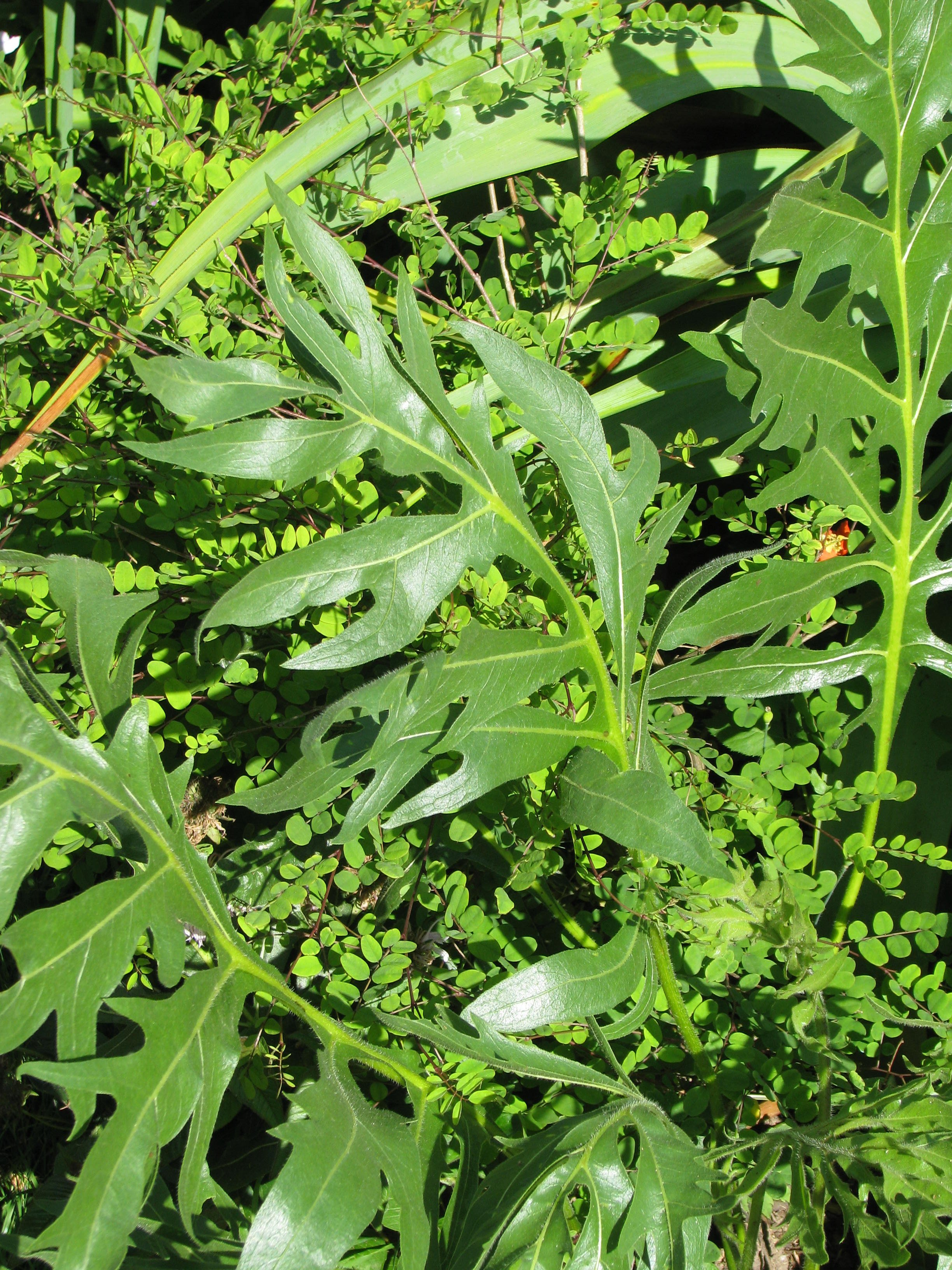
Silphium laciniatum (compass plant) leaves

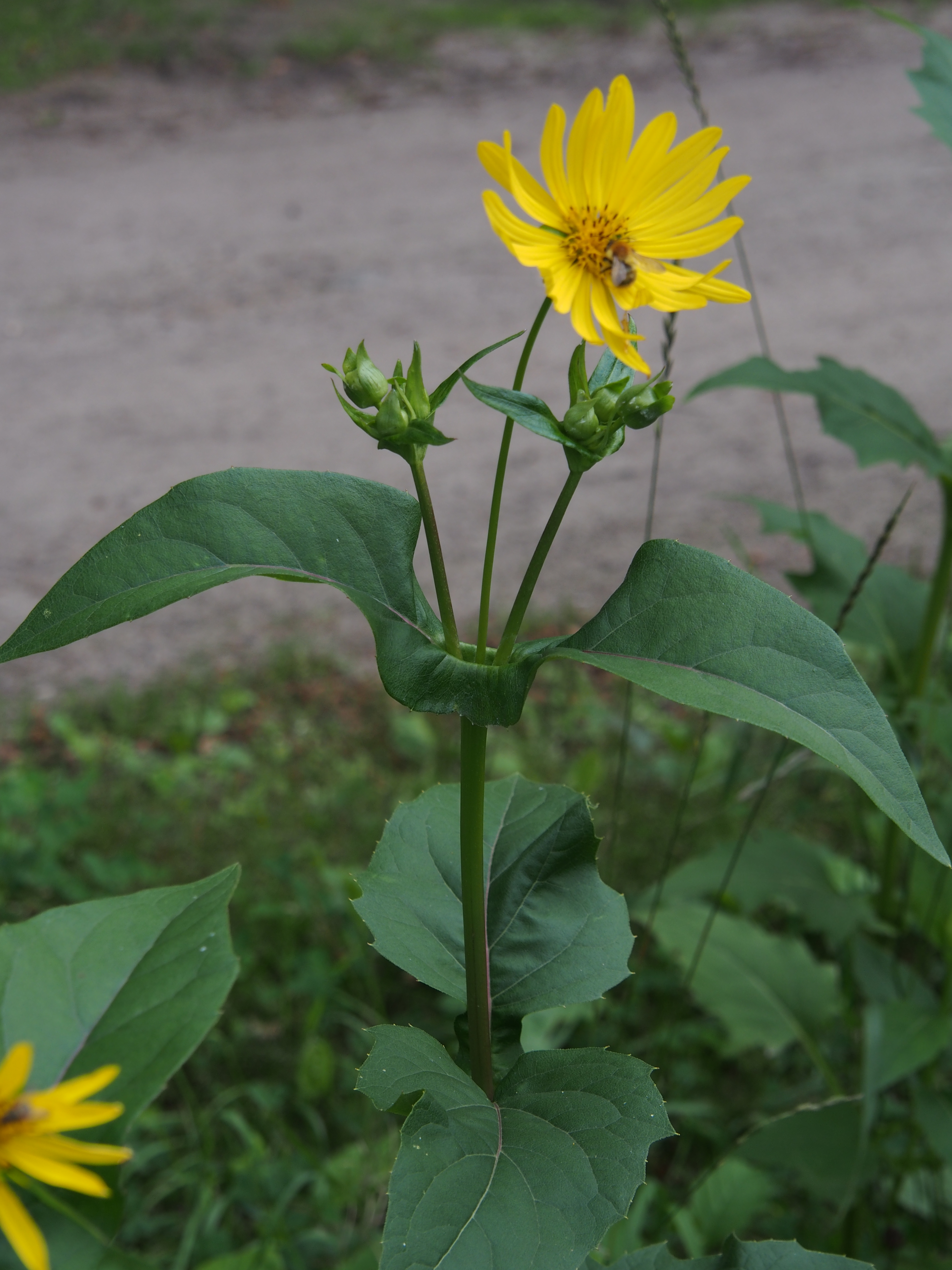
Silphium perfoliatum (cup plant) flowers in Lower Saxony, Germany

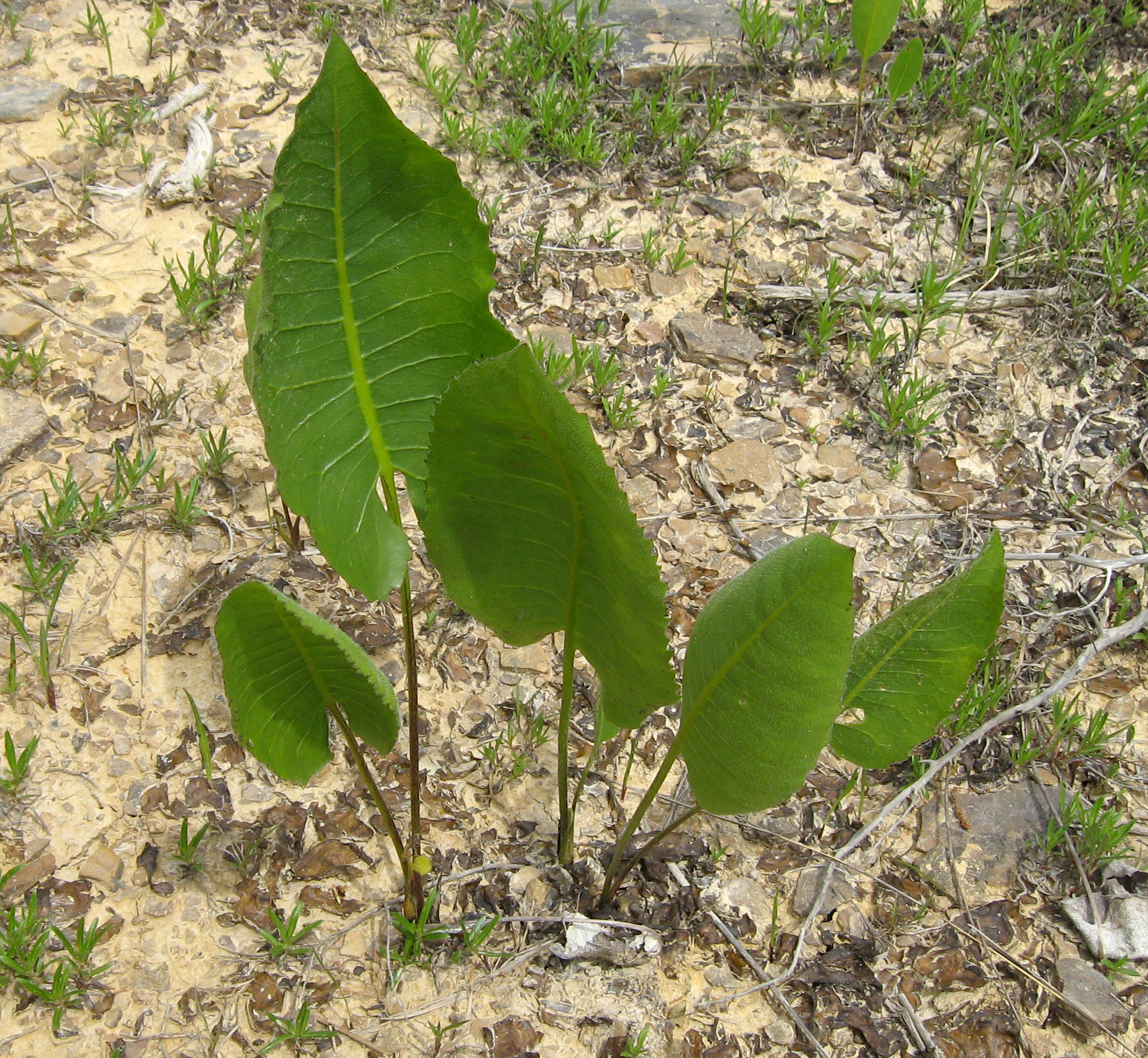
Silphium terebinthinaceum (prairie dock) leaves

=== Formerly included ===
Numerous species are now regarded as members of the genera Berlandiera and Verbesina.

== See also ==
- Genus Calycadenia – the western rosinweeds
