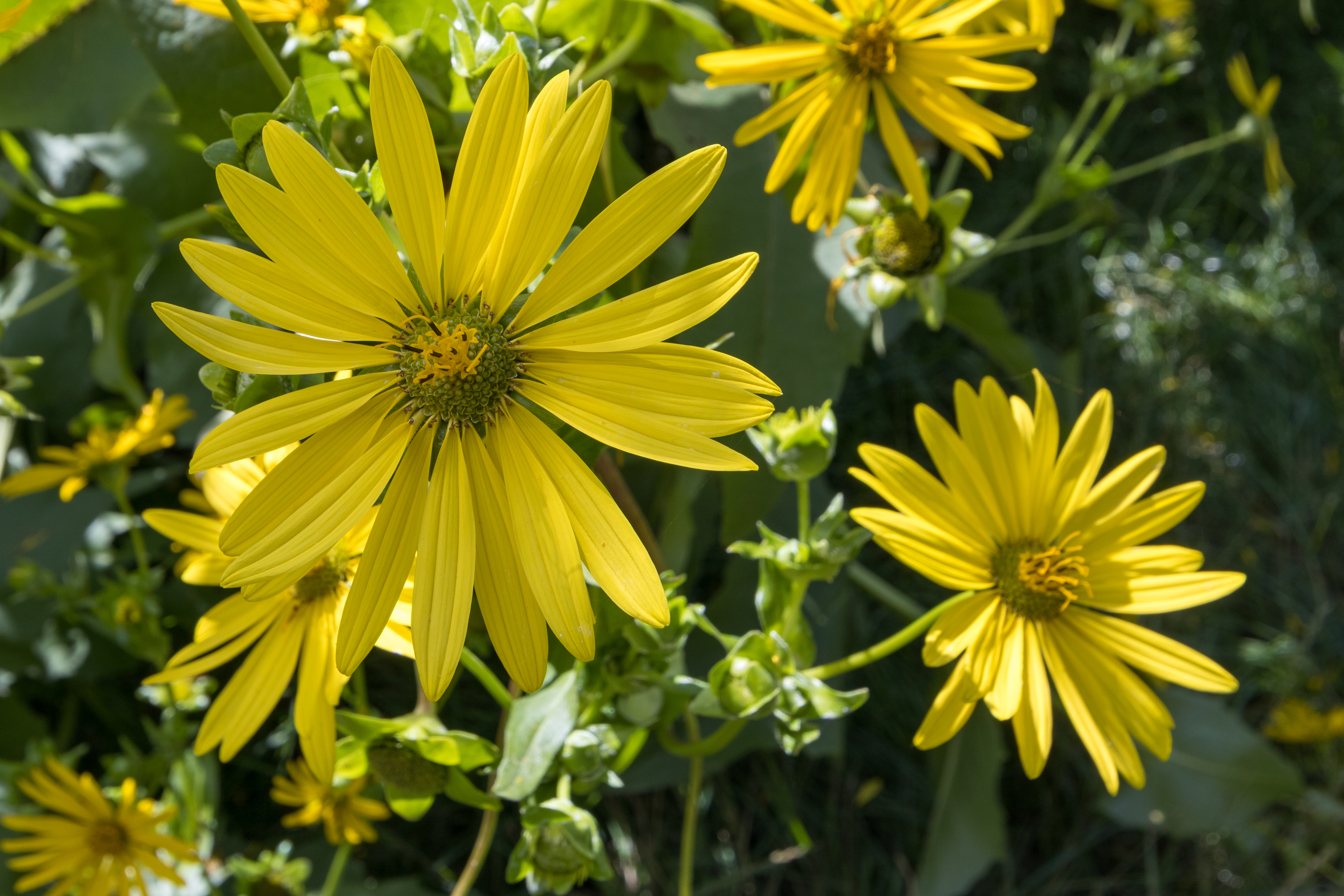

Conservation status
- Secure (NatureServe)

Scientific classification
- Kingdom: Plantae
- Clade: Tracheophytes
- Clade: Angiosperms
- Clade: Eudicots
- Clade: Asterids
- Order: Asterales
- Family: Asteraceae
- Tribe: Heliantheae
- Genus: Silphium
- Species: S. perfoliatum

Binomial name
- Silphium perfoliatum L.

= Silphium perfoliatum =

Species of flowering plant

Silphium perfoliatum, the cup plant or cup-plant, is a species of flowering plant in the family Asteraceae, native to eastern and central North America. It is an erect herbaceous perennial with triangular toothed leaves, and daisy-like yellow composite flower heads in summer.

The specific epithet perfoliatum means "through the leaf."

There are two varieties:

- Silphium perfoliatum var. connatum
- Silphium perfoliatum var. perfoliatum.

== Common names ==
- Cup plant
- Cup-plant
- Carpenter's weed
- Cup rosinweed
- Compass plant
- Pilot weed
- Squareweed
- Indian cup

== Description ==
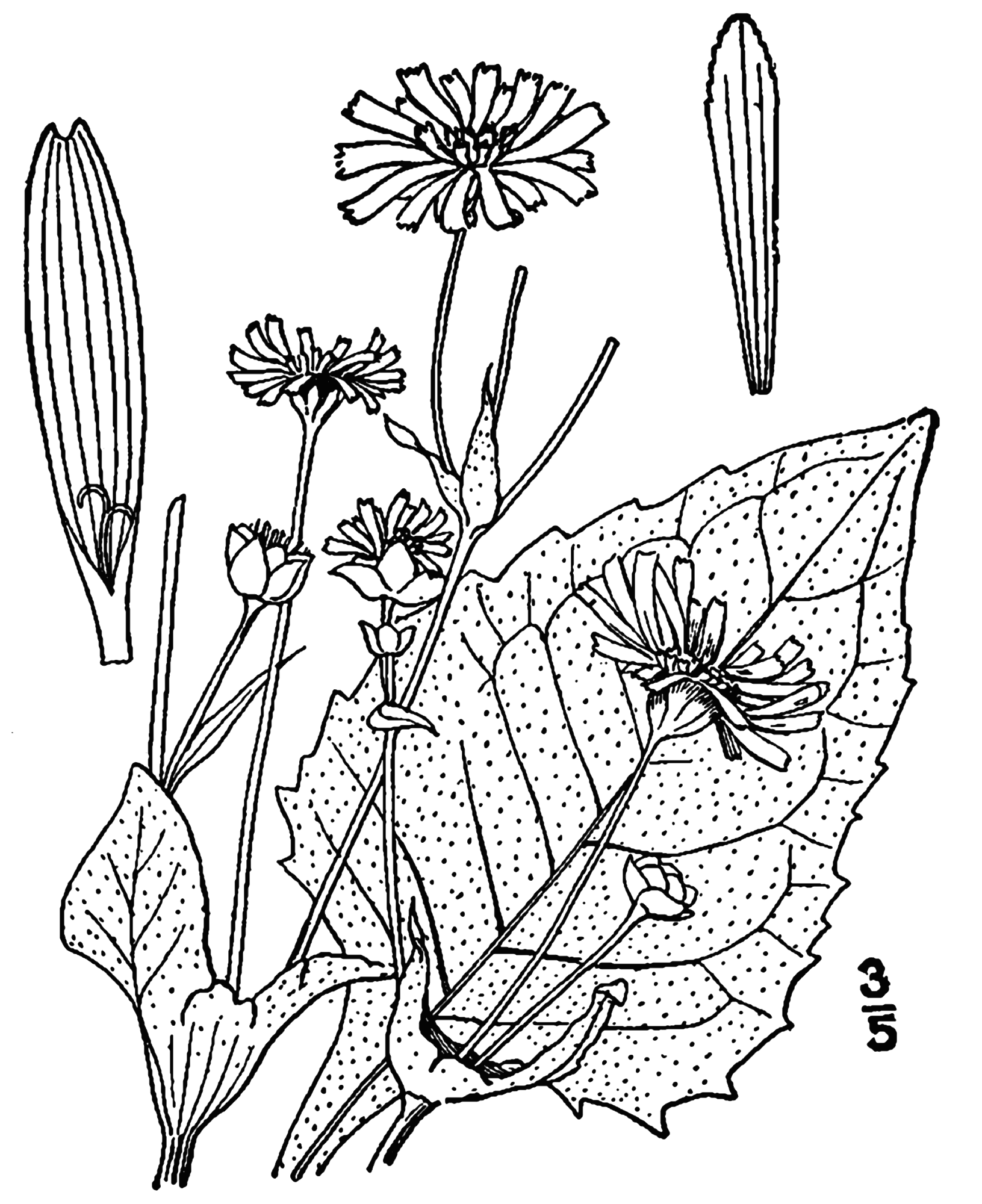
Line drawing of S. perfoliatum from An Illustrated Flora of the Northern United States, Canada and the British Possessions

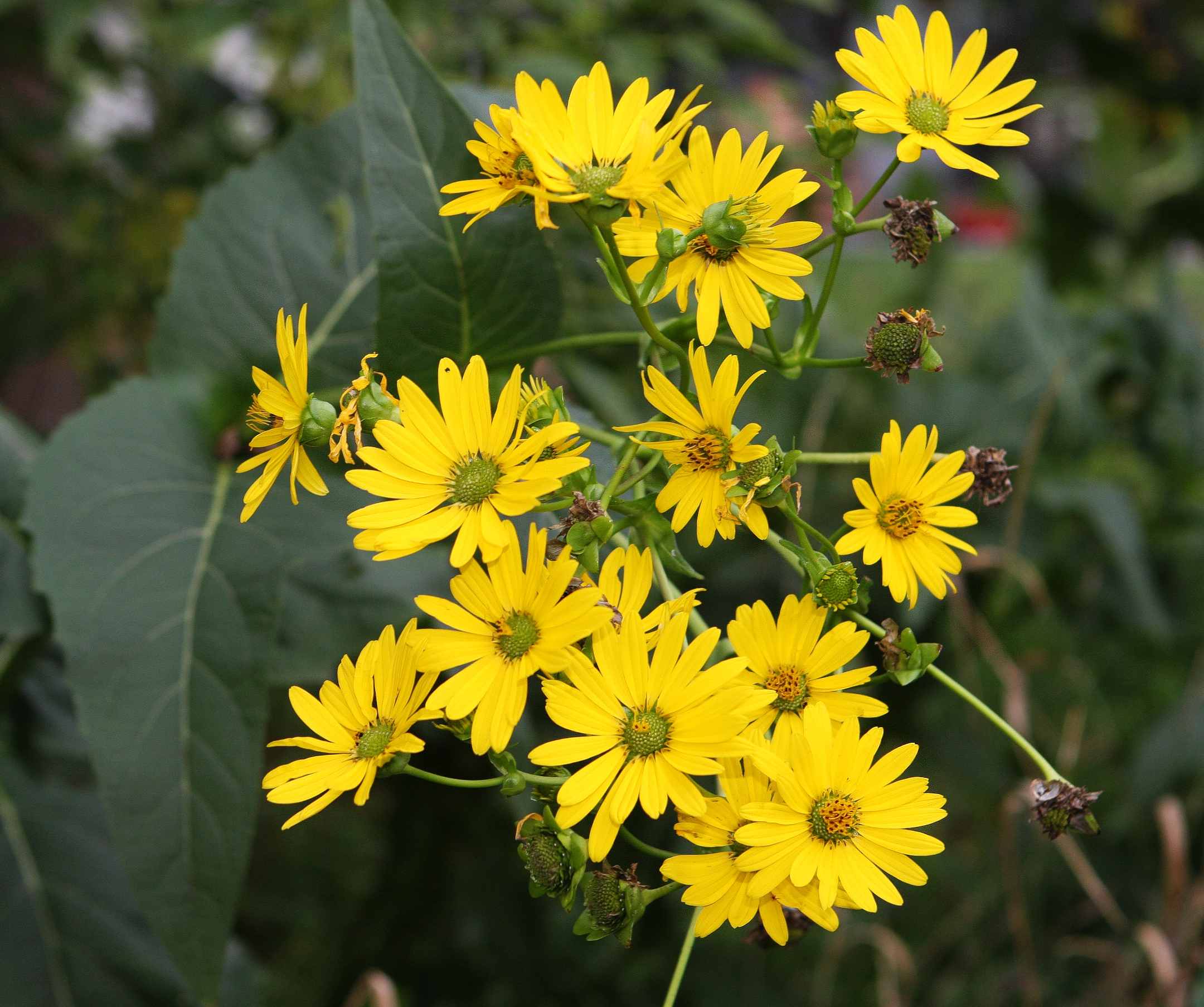
A flower cluster

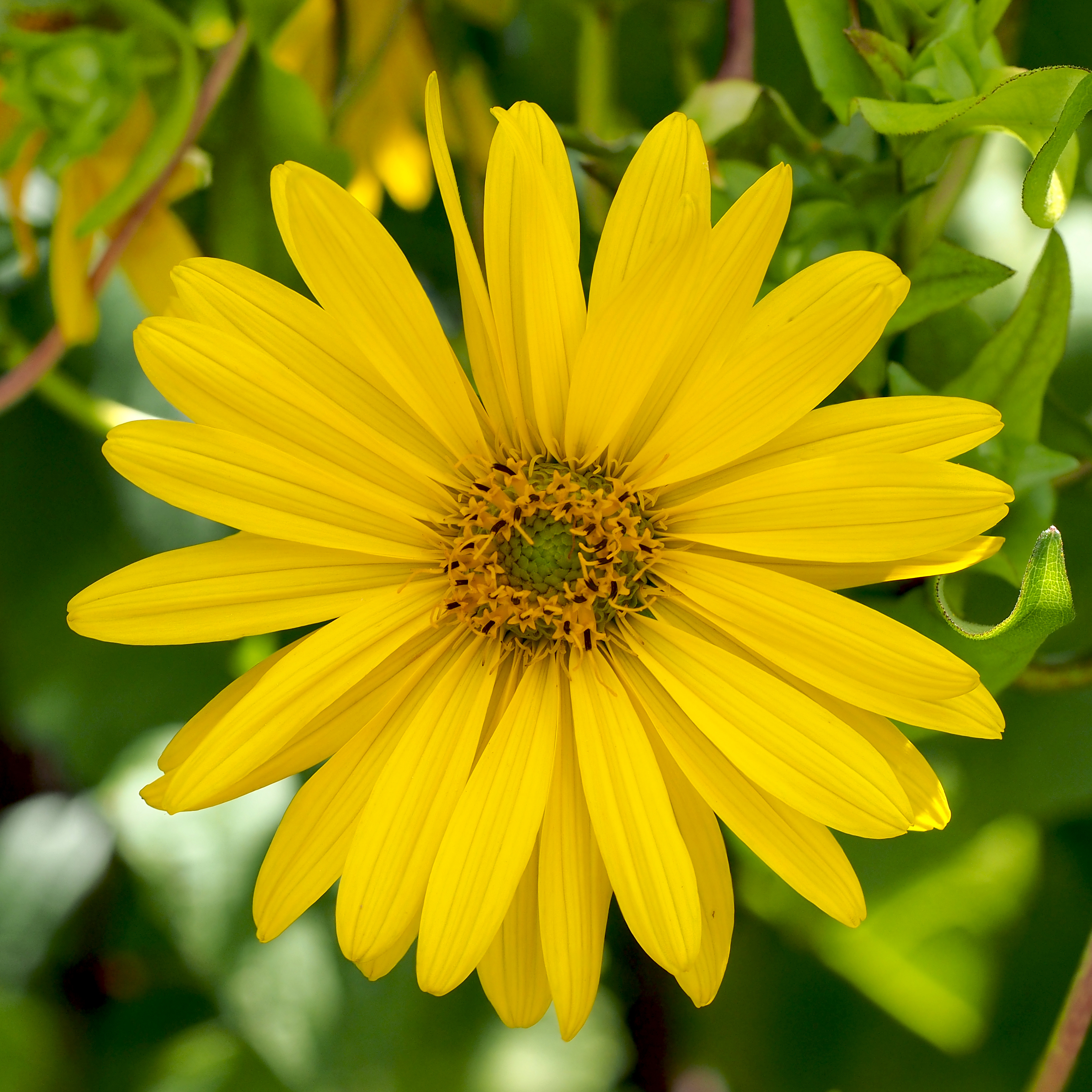
Macro view of flower head

=== Habitat and distribution ===
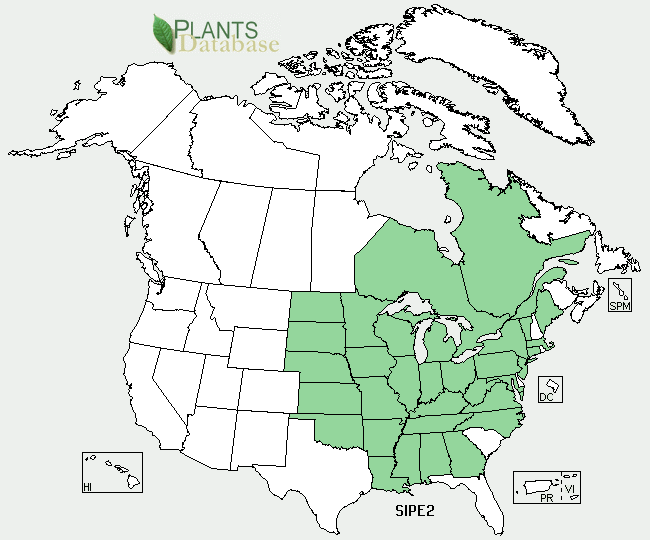
North American distribution of Silphium perfoliatum

Silphium perfoliatum grows in sandy moist bottom lands, floodplains, near stream beds, in or adjacent to open woodland. Currently, it can be found in the following states:

- USA (AL, AR, CT, GA, IA, IL, IN, KS, KY, LA, MA, MD, ME, MI, MN, MO, MS, NC, ND, NE, NJ, NY, OH, OK, PA, SD, TN, VA, VT, WI, WV)
- CAN (ON, QC)

Silphium perfoliatum is listed as a threatened species in Michigan, while it is listed as a prohibited and highly invasive plant species in New York State.

=== Morphology of the plant ===
The typical height of S. perfoliatum plant ranges from 1–2.5 m (3–8 ft). The stem is stout, smooth, slightly hairy (glabrous) strongly 4-angled square, like mint plants. The leaves are opposite, toothed and ovate. The petioles are widely winged and fused around the stem, forming a cup. The first flower develops on the tip of the main stem, then more flowers develop on side branches.

=== Morphology of the flowers ===
The flowers, which appear from midsummer to autumn (fall), look very similar to sunflowers, but are a lot smaller; measuring about 2.5 cm in diameter, with golden yellow ray florets. In the middle of the flower there are small, sterile, tubular disk florets, which are structurally bisexual, but the stamens are the only fertile part, and they do not produce seeds. The corollas are tubular, 5-toothed, and the style is undivided.

=== Generative reproduction ===
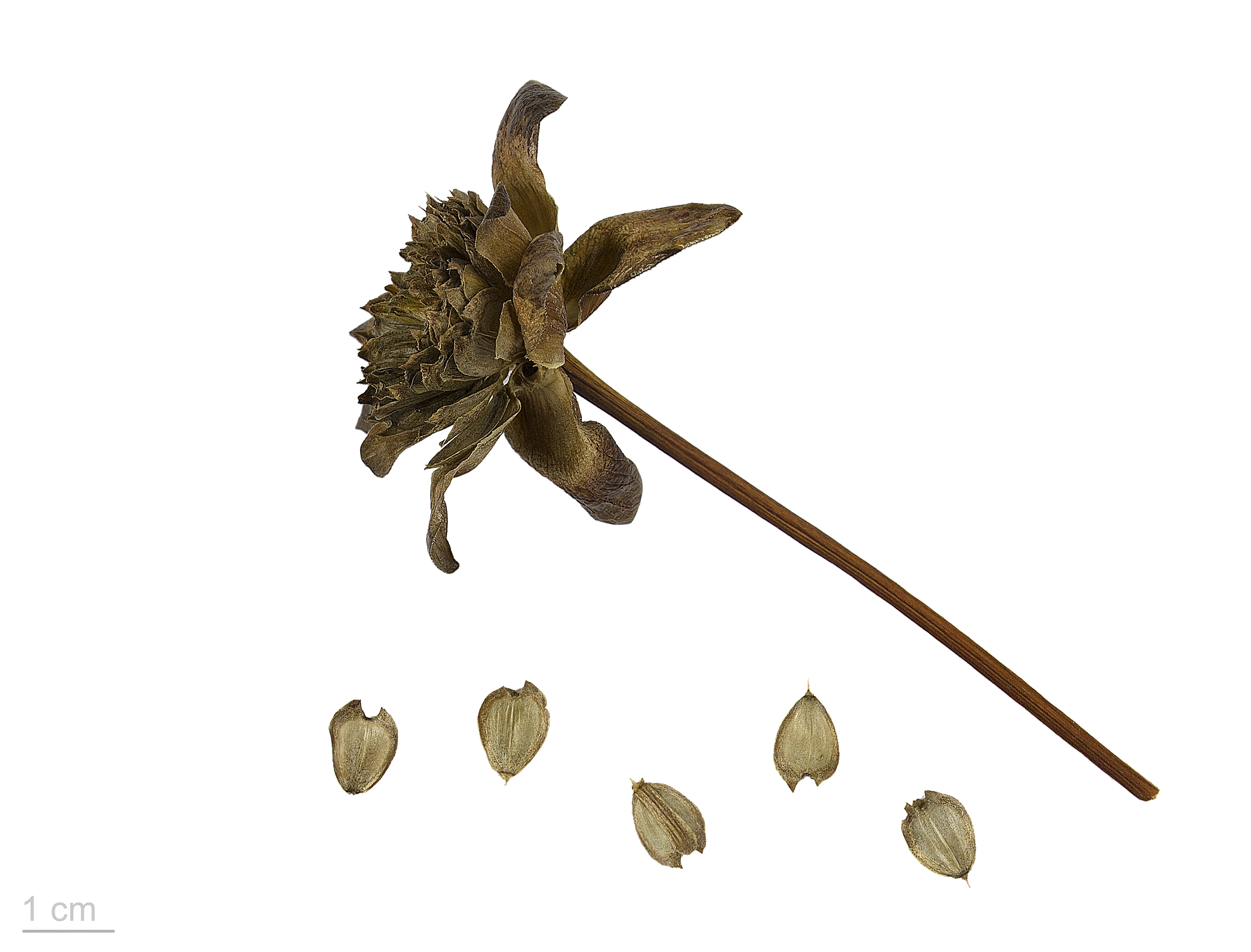
Seed head and seeds – MHNT

The ray florets have female characteristics, and eventually develop to become thin brown achenes with a marginal wing utilized for wind dispersal. Insect pollinators including bees, butterflies, and skippers help to cross-fertilize flowers to produce seeds. 20 to 30 seeds are created in each flower head. Each seed is about 9 to 15 mm long, 6–9 mm wide, flattened in shape, with a thickness of 1 mm.

=== Vegetative reproduction ===
Silphium perfoliatum is able to establish colonies due to its central taproot system and shallow rhizomes. A multi-rhizomed clone originating from a single seed is believed to be 15 years old. The roots found in botanical gardens have been estimated to be more than 50 years old. S. perfoliatum has an extensive root system and does not transplant well except when very young.

=== Habitat and hardiness ===
Silphium perfoliatum's metabolic pathway is the C3 carbon fixation. This plant is highly adapted to endure extreme weather and inhospitable conditions. For example, during the winter, the roots remain dormant and can survive temperatures as low as −30 °C (−22 °F). Its optimal growing temperature is 20 °C (68 °F).

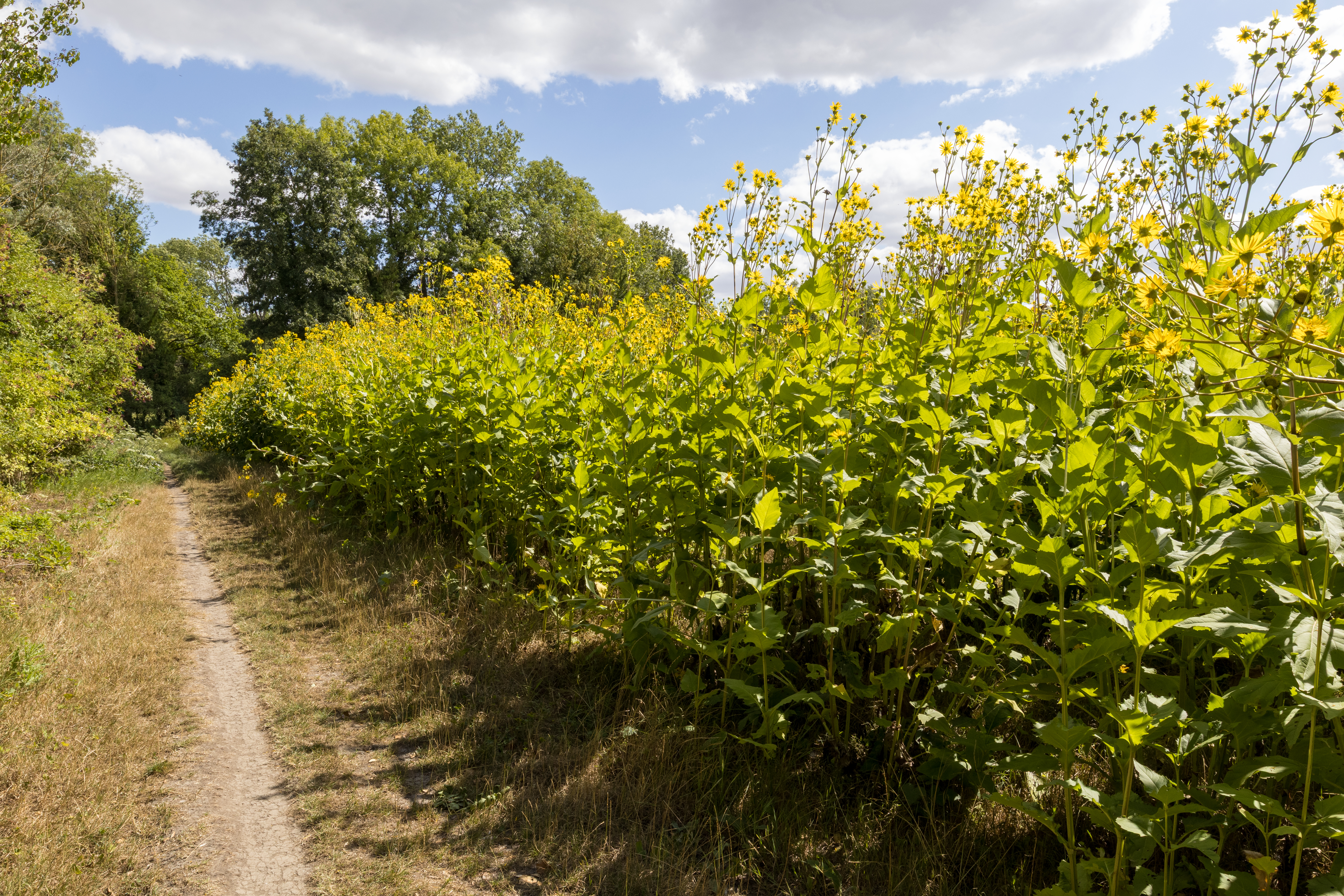
A field of leafy Silphium

== Uses ==
=== Use as energy crop ===
Silphium perfoliatum is considered a potential energy crop plant, especially because it has low demands on the climate, the soil and previous crop and produces high amounts of biomass. Based on the results of the Thuringian State Institute of Agriculture the plant can be an alternative plant for biogas production. The annual biomass yields are very different according to the present literature: In the second cultivation year S. perfoliatumcan grow from 13 to 20 tons of biomass per hectare, an experiment done in Thüringen, Germany even showed that 18 to 28 tons of dry weight per hectare are possible.

==== Cultivation ====
In Germany, the arable cultivation of S. perfoliatum is becoming increasingly widespread for biogas production. Its invasive potential for Mid European countries is considered low, but a spread through wind, birds and harvesting machines is possible. One has to be especially careful when growing S. perfoliatum near moving bodies of water, so that it cannot spread and germinate on river banks like Buddleja davidii does. This could be a potential problem, as these ecosystems are very sensitive.

===== Sowing and planting =====
Due to low germination rate of 15–20% with untreated seeds S. perfoliatum is usually planted as seedling. This is the reason for high investment costs in establishing the crop. Furthermore, there is no yield in the first planting season as S. perfoliatum is only harvested from the second year on. In Germany, seeding time to obtain an acceptable seedling development is in the beginning of May. The highest biomass yield is achieved with 10 cm × 50 cm (within-row spacing: 10 cm; distance between the rows: 50 cm). In European climate conditions the planting of seedlings is typically carried out at the end of May, or the beginning of June with planting machines from the vegetable and gardening industries. Low plant density (50 cm × 75 cm, 75 cm × 75 cm) can give a higher yield in the first harvestable year compared to the higher plant densities (50 cm × 50 cm). In the second harvestable year, they are similar, regardless of the plant density.

In order to avoid reduced yields in the first year a possible solution could be sowing S. perfoliatum in combination with corn. Three quarters of usual corn yields can be achieved in the first year and S. perfoliatum can establish after corn harvest, achieving its full potential in the following year.

===== Fertilisation =====
The fertilisation of S. perfoliatum should take place as early as possible in the year. This minimizes damage to the lap shoots from driving over them. S. perfoliatuma needs about 1 kg N to form 1 dt of dry matter. Depending on the expected yield, the fertilization per vegetation period is 130 – 160 kg N/ha. The fertilization of the following nutrients also depends on the expected yield. With an expected yield of 150 dt/ha, S. perfoliatum requires the following quantities of nutrients:

- Phosphorus: 25 kg/ha
- Potassium: 150 kg/ha
- Magnesium: 50 kg/ha
- Calcium: 200 kg/ha

Other tests show that fertilization is no longer necessary from the second year onwards. This shows that fertilization depends strongly on the expected yield. With a higher weighting of the ecological effects of the crop, the fertilization can be omitted. When used as an alternative to corn (biogas production), the aim is to achieve the highest possible biomass yield and fertilization is therefore necessary.

==== Disease and herbivory ====
Silphium perfoliatum are known to be disease and herbivory resistant, although established plants can be affected by the fungus Sclerotinia. However, this depends on the size of the area it is grown on, the growing conditions as well as the crop grown before the cup plant. Crops which are very susceptible to Sclerotinia sclerotiorum and therefore should not be cultivated previous to S. perfoliatum are rape seed and sunflowers. Even if S. perfoliatum show signs of Sclerotinia, they can recover from the fungus infection the following year. The University of Bayreuth does not mention any relevant fungal of bacterial infections at all in their research on the cup plant.

Eggs of the gall wasp are deposited within the stems of this plant. Consequently, the developing larvae feed within the stems. American goldfinches feed on the seeds of S. perfoliatum and drink the water collected by the "cups" on the stems. As cup plants are able to form dense colonies, they provide a good shelter for birds. Herbivores such as cattle and sheep will eat the leaves of the plant, especially those of young plants.

==== Advantages of cultivating Silphium perfoliatum instead of corn as an energy crop ====
===== Ecologically =====
- After the first year of cultivation, there is no need for herbicides anymore and the dense root mass protects the soil from erosion.
- There is little or no fertilizer required from the second year of cultivation.
- Improvement of soil quality by humus accumulation and regeneration of soil organisms (earthworms)
- Reduced erosion and risk of floodwaters
- No soil compaction
- No pesticides after the first year
- Cover for small game starting from April

===== Economically =====
- No food source for wild pigs (therefore no damages)
- No annual purchase of seeds, because this crop plant is a perennial and can be harvested up to 20 years
- No re-seeding fees
- Reduced use of soil treatment machines
- High resistance against drought (on deep soils) and severe winter frost
- After severe storms the fallen Silphium-stems may be left on the field. They do not obstruct the new shoots in spring and do not have to be removed like corn stems.
- Regrown vegetatively reestablished cup plants tolerate light frosts. Thus they are less vulnerable to early or late frosts than corn.
- The cultivation of cup plants reduces risks in years of unfavourable weather conditions for corn (like wet and cold spring, summer drought).
- Cup plants may be harvested over a relatively long period, which attenuates work peaks.
- Long use of established stands (high saving potentials)

Some farmers are hesitant to grow this plant, because S. perfoliatum can not be harvested in the first year of cultivation. This issue can be solved by intercropping it with corn in the first year, which can be harvested for biogas production too or for animal feed. Also, S. perfoliatum should be cultivated for at least five years to amortize the initial costs.

==== Potential invasiveness if cultivated as an energy crop ====
Although in North America it is a native plant, the cup plant has been declared invasive in several States in the US. Therefore, its invasiveness is in active discussion, especially when considering it as a potential biofuel crop.

To establish potential invasiveness, there is the Weed Risk Assessment (WRA), which can be modified for the local environment and be used to evaluate the potential invasiveness of species proposed as biofuels and to evaluate whether the traits selected for in biofuel species might predispose them to be invasive. There is the Australian- and the US-WRA. The cup plant, S. perfoliatum, has not been assessed yet. However, desirable traits for biofuels tend to overlap with those of invasive species, such as high productivity, low input requirements, and wide habitat breadth (Raghu et al., 2013). S. perfoliatum fits these criteria, but because generatively reproduced seeds have low germination rates, one could hypothesize that the potential invasiveness is relatively small and that the spread of S. perfoliatum can be contained. Furthermore, one could harvest before the seeds reach their full maturity.

=== Use as animal fodder ===
Although its use as an energy crop prevails, S. perfoliatum can also be used as a fodder plant thanks to its ingredients. S. perfoliatum contains amino acids, carbohydrates (inulin in rhizomes), L-ascorbic acid, terpenes with essential oils, triterpene saponins, carotenoids, phenolic acid, tannins, and flavonoids. The cup plant is considered to have a high feed value for meat and milk producing farm animals because of its longevity and high protein levels. S. perfoliatum can be stored as silage. It is recommended to harvest the plant twice a year. Otherwise, the stem gets too tough due to the high content of fibre. The high water content at the first cutting in June is not a problem when letting the plant wilt shortly.

The blooming period of S. perfoliatum takes eight or more weeks. The long blooming period and abundance of flowers provides a rich source for bees and the cultivation of honey. The honey is rich in fructose and crystalizes therefore only slowly. 150 kg honey per hectare and year are reported as a possible yield from a cup plant field.

=== Use for medical purposes ===
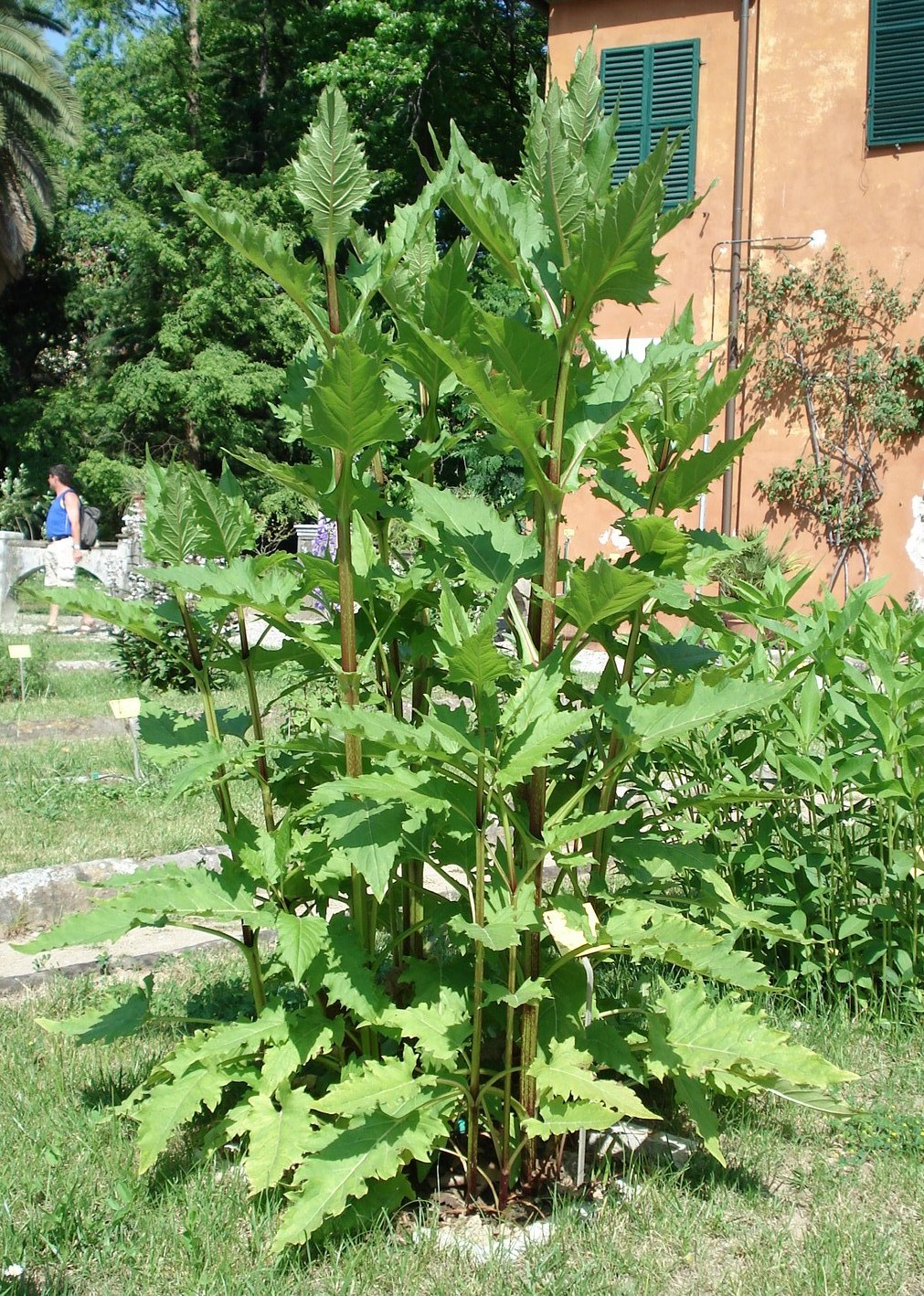
Silphium perfoliatum – Orto botanico di Pisa

S. perfoliatum produces a resin that has an odor similar to turpentine. The plant contains a gum and resin; the root has been used medicinally. The resin has been made into chewing gum to prevent nausea and vomiting. Native Americans would cut off the top of the plant stalk and collect the resinous sap that was emitted from the plant. The resin was used for a chewing gum to freshen the breath. The Winnebagos Tribe believed that a potion made from the rhizome would provide supernatural powers. The people belonging to the tribe would drink this potion before hunting. The people of the Chippewas tribe used the root extract for back and chest pains, to prevent excessive menstruation, and to treat lung hemorrhage. During the spring, the tender young leaves were cultivated as an acceptable food source by cooking or a salad.

The powdered form of S. perfoliatum has diaphoretic and tonic properties. It can help alleviate the symptoms of fevers, dry cough, asthma, spleen illness, heart and liver disease. The extract from the leaves of the plant has shown to lower cholesterol and triglycerides levels in blood. Studies show that the presence of phenolic acids is responsible for the species’ antiseptic activity to stimulate generation of IgG and IgM antibodies. In addition, it stimulates bile production of the gall bladder.

=== Use as pollinator and bird-friendly ornamental garden plants ===
The flowers of S. perfoliatum make it an attractive plant for many pollinators, the seeds along with the "cups" of water, formed along the stems, are attractive to birds as a food and water source. During the 1750s, the species was introduced to the United Kingdom and the Soviet Union, and has been prized as an ornamental plant since. It was named in 1759 by Carl Linnaeus. In the UK it has gained the Royal Horticultural Society's Award of Garden Merit.

Silphium perfoliatum is sold by a good number of native plant nurseries and some specialty nurseries in the US and Canada; rarely in conventional nurseries. It is often used in prairie and native meadow restorations and in native, naturalistic landscapes and gardens; only infrequently in conventional landscapes and gardens by landscape designers and architects that know of it as a unique looking perennial. A large patch was planted at Millennium Park in Chicago, Illinois, near the Lurie Garden, in 2010. In gardening and landscaping it is best used in groups and not individually, as it is so vertical and the flower stalks are more likely to fall over when grown singularly.
