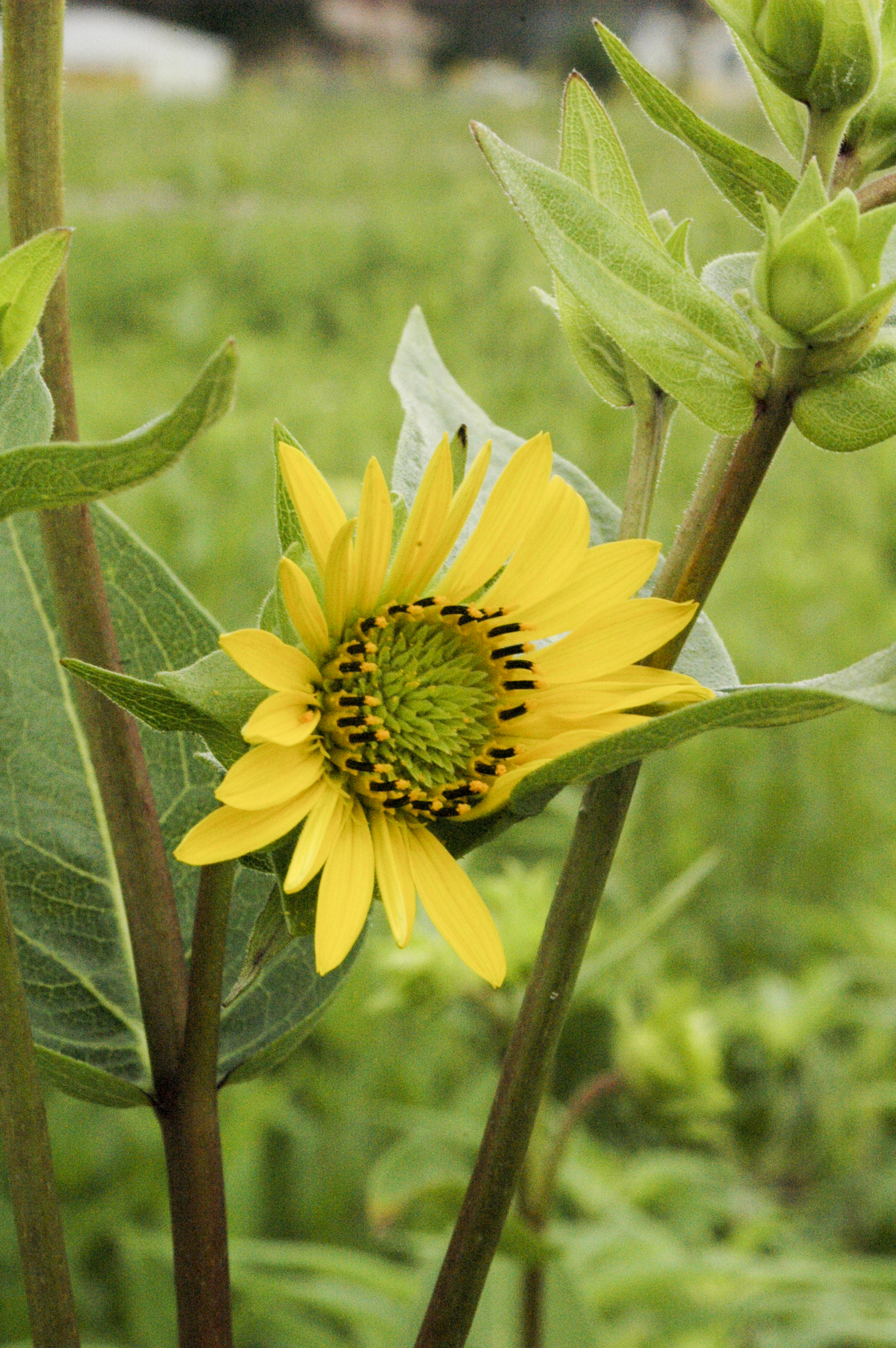

Conservation status
- Secure (NatureServe)

Scientific classification
- Kingdom: Plantae
- Clade: Tracheophytes
- Clade: Angiosperms
- Clade: Eudicots
- Clade: Asterids
- Order: Asterales
- Family: Asteraceae
- Tribe: Heliantheae
- Genus: Silphium
- Species: S. integrifolium

Binomial name
- Silphium integrifolium Michx.

= Silphium integrifolium =

Species of flowering plant

Silphium integrifolium is a species of flowering plant in the family Asteraceae. Its common names include rosinweed, whole-leaf rosinweed, entire-leaf rosinweed, prairie rosinweed, and silflower. It is native to eastern North America, including Ontario in Canada and the eastern and central United States as far west as New Mexico.

== Description ==
This species is a perennial herb growing from a fibrous root system and producing stems up to 2 meters (6 ft 7 in) tall. It can form a large clump of up to 100 stems. The stems are hairless to slightly rough-haired, and sometimes waxy in texture. The leaves are stemless and oppositely arranged on the stems. The basal leaves are lost by maturity. The leaf blades are lance-shaped to ovate, smooth-edged or toothed, hairless to rough-haired, and up to about 23 cm (9 in) long. The inflorescence holds one to 15 flower heads. The head is lined with 2 or 3 rows of phyllaries which are hairless or rough and sometimes glandular, and have rounded bases and pointed tips. The head has up to 36 yellow ray florets and many yellow disc florets. The fruit has a short pappus.

There are two varieties of the species:

- Silphium integifolium var. integrifolium – 40 to 200 cm (1 ft 4 in to 6 ft 7 in) in height
- Silphium integifolium var. laeve – generally 100 to 150 cm (3 ft 3 in to 4 ft 11 in) tall, with more florets and hairless leaves

== Ecology ==
The foliage of the plant is eaten by herbivores such as the white-tailed deer and the blister beetle Epicauta fabricius. Plants have also been noted to lose approximately 17% of their fruits to lepidopteran larvae. The most common herbivorous insect on this species is the gall wasp Antistrophus silphii. The wasp injects its eggs into the apical meristem of the plant, and as its larvae develop, a spherical gall up to 4 cm (1 1/2 in) wide forms in the meristem. This stops the shoot from growing. Up to 30 larvae overwinter in each gall, pupate, and emerge as adult wasps the following season. It is reported to be a host and nectar plant for many species of bees, butterflies, and moths.

== Domestication ==
S. integrifolium is being domesticated as an oil plant, and as forage for livestock. Characteristics of the seeds (such as the sizes of the kernel and its wing) have implications for the amount of oil that can be harvested and vary across different geographical regions. For example, the kernel tends to be larger further south and west of their geographical distribution. In general, these seeds come from pollinated flowers that are arranged along flower heads (or capitulum). The number of flower heads on a plant can vary from individual to individual or from one species in the genus to another. For example, S. integrifolium tends to have more flower heads than S. perfoliatum, a closely related perennial crop candidate.

The stems and leaves of these plants can be used as forage for livestock. S. integrifolium first grows as a rosette of large leaves, and then in subsequent growing seasons, these plants will grow multiple taller stems. Between growing seasons, these vegetative tissues die back. The amount of vegetative tissue grown by S. integrifolium tends to be less than the amount of vegetative tissue grown by S. perfoliatum.

While this type of plant may be grown for both oil seeds and forage for livestock, the same plants cannot be used efficiently for both uses in the same year because trimming the plants reduces their seed yield. Instead, different populations of Silphium plants will prioritize the production of oil or forage. S. integrifolium and S. perfoliatum can even pollinate each other, which can provide interesting combinations of traits for breeders. However, individual genotypes are incapable of pollinating themselves. S. integrifolium is also attractive for breeders because it is drought-resistant and takes up nitrogen in the soil compared to other perennial crop candidates.

Many of the traits that interest breeders for domestication are controlled by genetic factors (i.e., are heritable) rather than the environment or random chance. Some heritable traits in S. integrifolium include plant height and number of stalks. However, the importance of genetic factors is often exceeded by correlations among different sets of replicates within the same environment.

Different combinations of traits can be important for breeders because they have more traits from which to select to produce the “ideal” plant, and variation in traits can indicate that the population is not too inbred. Inbreeding can affect both vigor and fitness. Wild genotypes of S. integrifolium are often less inbred than domesticated genotypes. Domesticated genotypes of S. integrifolium are also often more inbred than many annual crops but less inbred than other perennial crop candidates.

Domestication efforts can be considered “from new” (de novo domestication) or by crossing very different genotypes or species (wide hybridization). While de novo domestication involves artificially selecting plants with desirable traits (e.g., more oil or forage), wide hybridization can help incorporate new genetic material from more widespread geographic regions.

== Uses ==
The plant had uses among Native American peoples. The Meskwaki, for example, used the roots to treat pain from injuries.

This species is cultivated for use in gardens. Compared to other Silphium species, it is shorter, less likely to topple over, and faster from seed to flower. While it looks similar to sunflowers (Helianthus), it is more manageable than most perennial sunflowers because it spreads more slowly, and it is not known to be allelopathic.

Researchers at the Land Institute, with a number of collaborating institutions, have initiated a project to domesticate this species for use as an oilseed crop. It also is under consideration as a good companion plant among solar panels.
