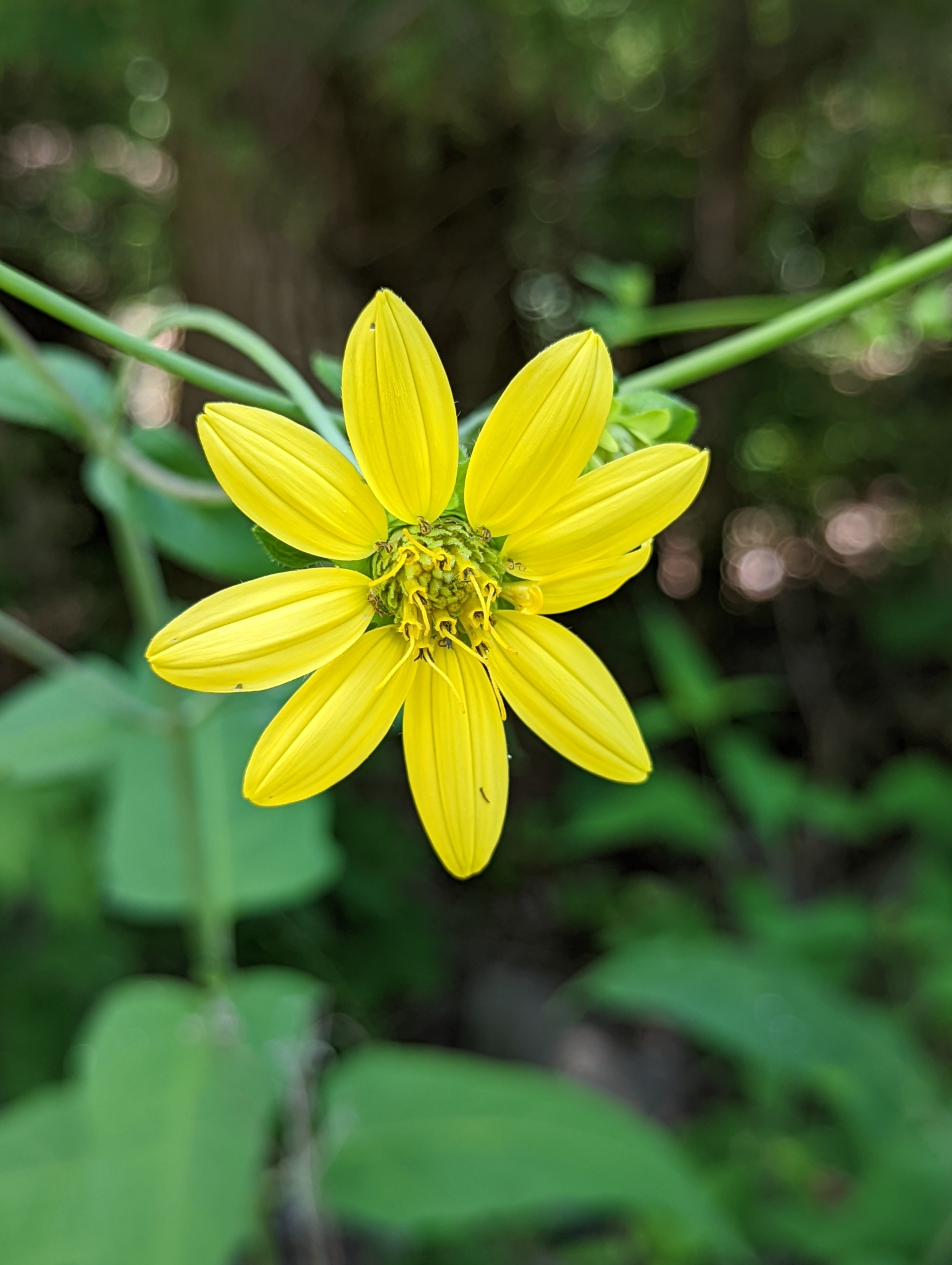

Scientific classification
- Kingdom: Plantae
- Clade: Tracheophytes
- Clade: Angiosperms
- Clade: Eudicots
- Clade: Asterids
- Order: Asterales
- Family: Asteraceae
- Tribe: Heliantheae
- Genus: Silphium
- Species: S. brachiatum

Binomial name
- Silphium brachiatum Gatt.

= Silphium brachiatum =

Species of plant

Silphium brachiatum is a species of flowering plant in the family Asteraceae known commonly as Cumberland rosinweed. It is a rare member of the genus Silphium and is native to the southern Cumberland Plateau where it is found in only a few counties of Alabama, Georgia, and Tennessee. It was described by Augustin Gattinger, the first state botanist of Tennessee.
