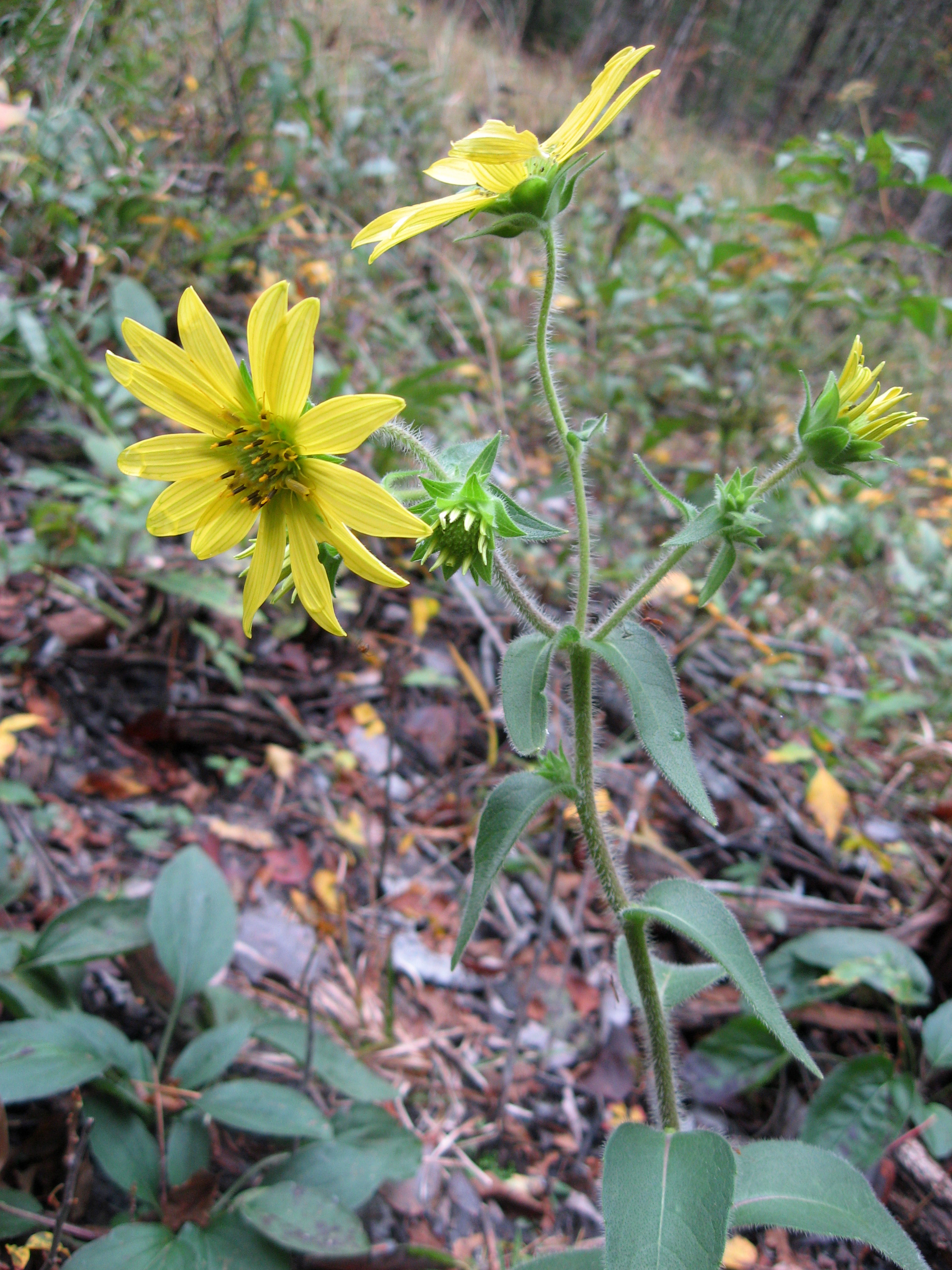

Conservation status
- Vulnerable (NatureServe)

Scientific classification
- Kingdom: Plantae
- Clade: Tracheophytes
- Clade: Angiosperms
- Clade: Eudicots
- Clade: Asterids
- Order: Asterales
- Family: Asteraceae
- Tribe: Heliantheae
- Genus: Silphium
- Species: S. mohrii

Binomial name
- Silphium mohrii Small

= Silphium mohrii =

Species of flowering plant

Silphium mohrii, known by the common names Mohr's rosinweed and shaggy rosinweed, is a species of flowering plant in the family Asteraceae. It is native to the Southeastern United States, where it is native only to northern Alabama, southern Tennessee, and extreme northwest Georgia. It is native to prairie remnants and rocky limestone openings. Because of its restricted range and severely declined habitat, it is considered a vulnerable species.

It produces heads of yellow flowers in late summer.
