= Cemetery prairie =

Remnant of original grassland ecosystem

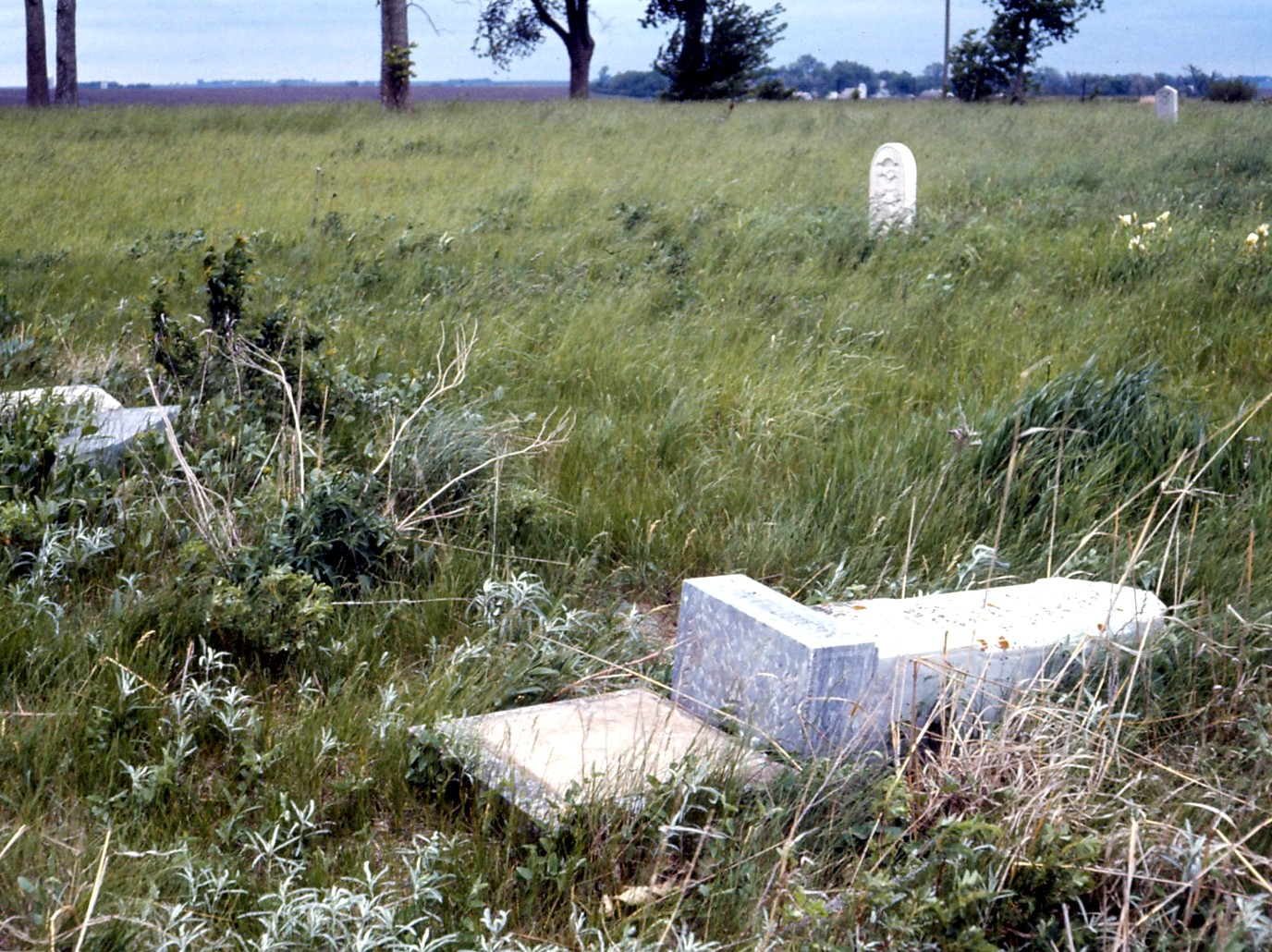
Pioneer Cemetery, Hull, Iowa

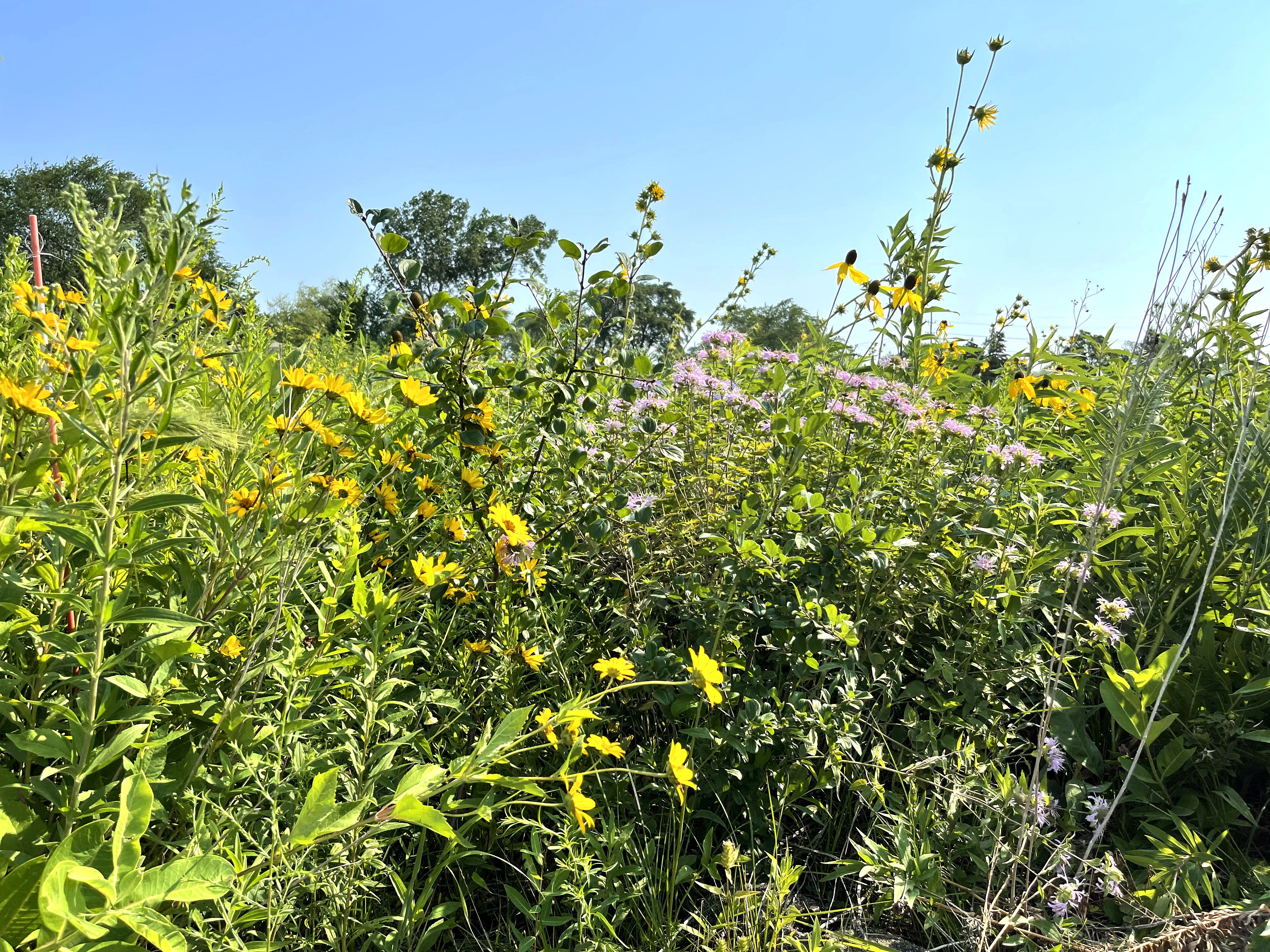
Native tallgrass prairie at James Woodworth Prairie Preserve, Illinois

Cemetery prairies are remnants of native North American prairie that survive on land set aside by settlers as burial grounds. These places were thus left unplowed and largely undisturbed, such that the cemeteries became de facto nature preserves. Natural prairie grasses are often perennial species that regrow from the roots after ruminant grazing or grassfire; plowing destroys the root system and eventually the ecosystem.

Native prairie is now vanishingly rare, so any surviving patches are considered precious. According to prairie researcher John Madson in 1974, "Most surviving tallgrass prairie preserves are relatively small. In Iowa or Illinois, as much as a square mile of virgin tallgrass prairie would be a huge and immensely valuable tract." Iowa is estimated to have 200 to 300 relic cemetery prairies totaling about 1,000 acres (400 ha; 1.6 mi^{2}; 4.0 km^{2}), which is thought to be less than 0.1 percent of the state's original native grassland. Missouri has approximately 60,000 acres (24,000 ha; 94 mi^{2}; 240 km^{2}) of original prairie, which is a larger absolute area but nonetheless still less than 0.5 percent of the prairie extent pre-settlement. Only about 2,300 acres (930 ha; 3.6 mi^{2}; 9.3 km^{2}) of original prairie are left in Illinois, the Prairie State. Fifty of those Illinois acres are found within 29 historic cemeteries. In addition to cemetery prairies, other remnants of original prairie persisted on sand ridges and rocky hillsides unsuitable for agriculture, and along railroad rights-of-way.

Remnant cemetery prairies are valuable control groups or points of comparison for scientific studies of degraded or restored grasslands. The genetic material preserved in these remnants can be drawn upon for larger ecological restorations. Scientists also use cemeteries, generally, to measure topsoil erosion. One cemetery prairie in Plainview, Illinois stands at least 1 ft (30 cm) above the surrounding cornfield, illustrating the difference in soil retention rates of perennial versus cultivated annual vegetation.

Some cemetery prairies have been abandoned over time, and some remain active community burial grounds. In both circumstances, maintenance, management and local politics are often ongoing challenges to preservation. Similarly, roads and paths that once led to the cemeteries may have disappeared over time, which simultaneously proffers a measure of security through obscurity and as a practical matter somewhat hinders preservation efforts.

== History and ecology ==
Prairie was generally found "east of the 100th meridian and north of the 35th parallel—within that great sprawl of country generally north of Tulsa, south of Winnipeg, west of Indianapolis, and east of Bismarck." Broader definitions of the Plains Grassland ecoregion put the northern extent in Alberta and the southern bound in Chihuahua. As The New York Times explained in 1970, "To the east the grass was tall, to the west, short. Only an occasional cottonwood or grove of burr oak, usually by a stream, broke the sea of grass."

Wildfire and use of the land as forage for herd animals strengthens rather than weakens a healthy, intact prairie grassland.

...the prairie had two strings to its bow. Fires thinned its grasses, but they thickened its stand of leguminous herbs; prairie clover, bush clover, wild bean, vetch, lead-plant, trefoil, and Baptisia, each carrying its own bacteria housed in nodules on its rootlets. Each nodule pumped nitrogen out of the air into the plant, and then ultimately into the soil. Thus the prairie savings bank took in more nitrogen from its legumes than it paid out to its fires. That the prairie is rich is known to the humblest deermouse; why the prairie is rich is a question seldom asked in all the still lapse of ages.

— Aldo Leopold, 1942

Native plant persistence in cemetery prairies is highly variable, as one 1970s-era survey of Illinois and Indiana prairie cemeteries detailed: "In each cemetery, certain prairie indicator species were sought, especially the warm-season grasses, such as big bluestem (Andropogon gerardii Vitman) and Indian grass (Sorghastrum nutans (L.) Nash). These grasses often persisted around tombstones and in fence rows, even in those cemeteries which had been heavily mowed. In many cases, the entire cemetery was still prairie. In others, prairie vegetation was to be found only in relatively undisturbed sections, such as areas along the perimeter."

Tallgrass prairie is highly biodiverse grassland; more than 150 species of plant on any given native prairie site would be typical. Researchers observing Rochester Cemetery Prairie in Rochester, Iowa—one of the best-studied and most notable cemetery prairies—have found 360 plant species. Most cemetery prairies are smaller than Rochester and have commensurately lower plant counts, but a survey by the Illinois Department of Natural Resources found an average of 114 native prairie and savanna species per site.

Some of the plant species that may be found in undisturbed cemetery prairie include Indian grass, big bluestem, little bluestem, compass plant, wild indigo, New Jersey tea, shooting star, blazing star, wild strawberry, bird's-foot violet, daisy fleabane, false dandelion, prairie phlox, golden Alexander, black-eyed Susan, leadplant, prairie rose, Canadian wild rye, white prairie clover, purple prairie clover, grassy death camas, lance-leaved aster, cord grass, stiff goldenrod, grama, switchgrass, sky-blue aster, white wild indigo, Indian plantain, Hill's thistle, yellow lady slipper, alum root, slender-leaved pinweed, wood lily, eastern prickly pear, wild quinine, wild petunia, showy goldenrod, slender ladies'-tresses, porcupine grass, goat's rue, silphium, purple gentian, showy tick trefoil, prairie dock, rattlesnake master, spiked lobelia, et al.

Partridges, badgers, turtles, coyotes, beaver and all manner of birds find their way into a prairie.

In a 2012 study of moth biodiversity on Illinois biofuel plantations growing maize, miscanthus or switchgrass, cemetery prairies were two of the three exemplars of native prairie used for comparison. Native prairie had the highest alpha diversity of the four types of field; the researchers found evidence that "large-scale conversion of acreage to biofuel crops may have substantial negative effects on arthropod biodiversity both within the cropping systems and in the surrounding landscape...In general, [related] studies have borne out the hypothesis that agricultural landscapes that offer a diverse flora of native perennials will harbor a higher diversity of beneficial arthropods than will extensive monocultures of annual plants such as corn and soybean." A similar message about cemeteries as useful biodiversity reservoirs for farm businesses was published by the U.S. Department of Agriculture in 1921.

Prairie cemeteries may also shelter valued introduced species such as naturalized asparagus, a favorite of foragers.

Restoration ecologists owe much to such preserved consecrated lands; their cultural place in our psyche has assured continuity of minimally disturbed ecological communities. Ironically, though, it is the neglected sacred places, those without the constant care needed to maintain carpets of lawn, as found in typical cemeteries, which have served as refuge to the native flora.

— Domenico D'Alessandro, "Sacred Space and Restoration Ecology"

== Maintenance ==
The Prairie Conference notes, "Natural vegetation management of pioneer cemeteries is typically done by people with a great deal of experience in prairie and savanna restoration but with little knowledge of caring for material culture." Prairie cemetery managers must preserve the historical integrity of grave markers and respect the socio-cultural and archeological value of a burial ground in addition to the usual considerations of maintaining a more typical natural area.

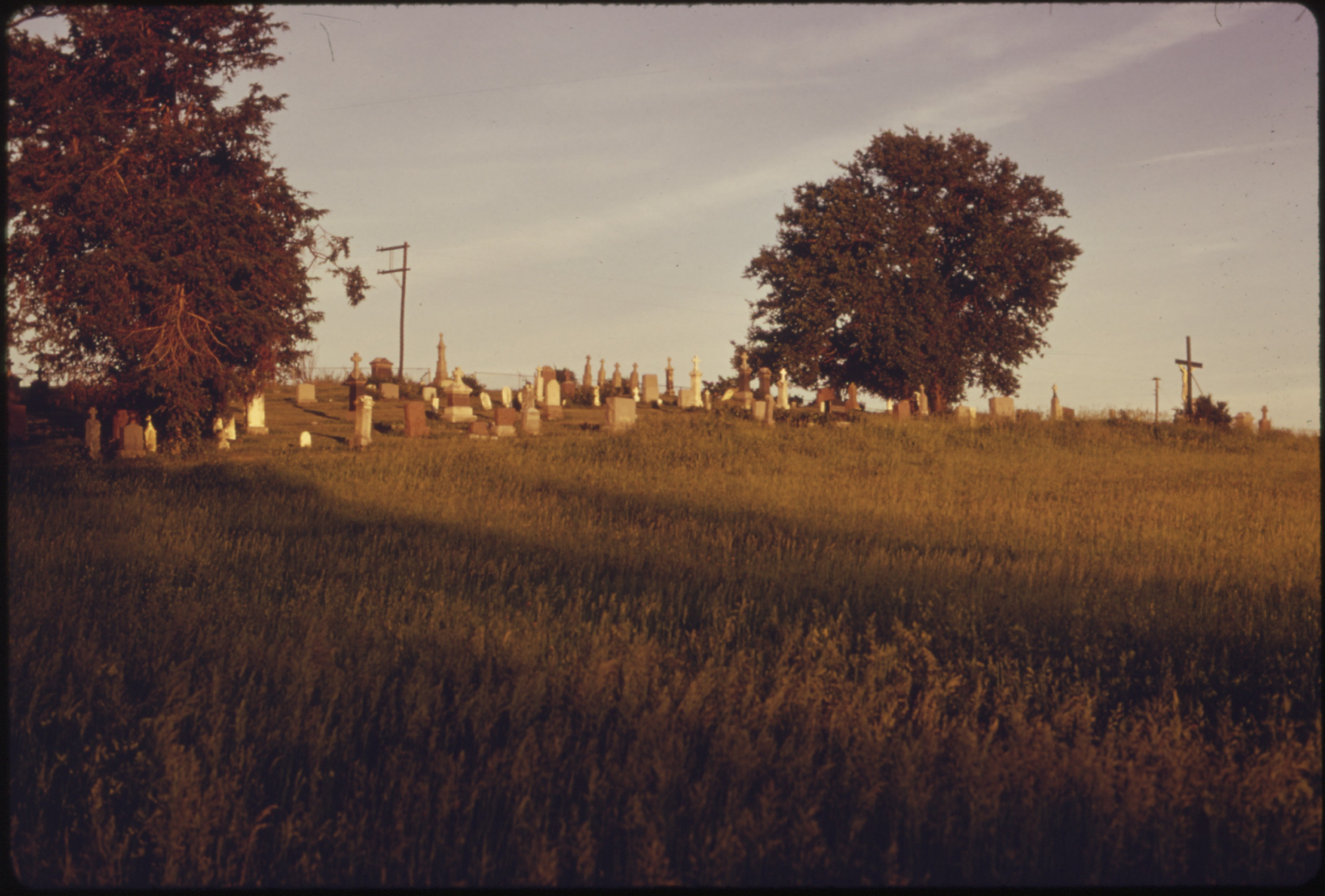
St Patrick's Catholic Cemetery, outside of Atchison, Kansas; photographed in the late afternoon sun in June 1974 for the U.S. Environmental Protection Agency

According to conservation managers, prairie needs the right combination of "care and neglect" to survive. Natural-resources specialists have found that cemeteries that are burned or cleaned once a year have the best chance of survival. Periodic controlled burns prevent tree seedlings and invasive species from overwhelming the indigenous grassland. Per the North American Prairie Conference, "While burning is very important to maintaining the historic vegetation, managers need to consider the protection of the stone markers. Excessive fuel (especially brush piles and downed trees) should be removed from the site and away from any markers to prevent heat damage. Fire-retardant chemicals or wetting agents should never be used on grave stones."

Non-native plants found in cemetery prairies typically fall into two categories: the usual suspects (opportunistic pioneers that thrive on disturbed ground, which is to say, weeds) and historically significant grave plantings and landscape trees. With grave plantings, especially, prairie stewards must strike a careful balance in ecological versus historical management. Invasive brome and red clover, which outcompete native plants, can be removed by annual spring burns followed by a cool-season grass herbicide, allowing the native seed bank in soil to gain a foothold for recovery. Unwanted trees can be girdled; the resulting snags are beneficial to wildlife.

== List of cemetery prairies ==
- Bigelow Cemetery Preserve, Ohio
- Brown School Road Cemetery, St. Joseph, Michigan
- Brownlee Prairie Cemetery Nature Preserve, Illinois
- Calvary Catholic Cemetery, St. Louis
- Clay Prairie, Allison, Iowa
- German Methodist Cemetery Prairie State Nature Preserve, Lake County, Indiana
- German Settler Cemetery, La Paz, Indiana
- Goewey Township Cemetery, Osceola County, Iowa
- Harrison Cemetery Prairie, southwest Michigan
- Hess Cemetery near Eagle Point, Illinois
- Horton Township Cemetery Prairie Preserve, Osceola County, Iowa
- Johnson Cemetery, Hillsdale County, Michigan
- Loda Cemetery Prairie, Illinois
- Mount Hope Cemetery, Barry County, Michigan
- Munson Township Cemetery Prairie Nature Preserve, north of Cambridge, Henry County, Illinois
- Pellsville Pioneer Cemetery, Butler Township, Vermilion County, Illinois
- Pioneer Cemetery, south of Baldwin City, Douglas County, Kansas
- Prospect Cemetery State Preserve
- Queen Anne Prairie Cemetery, Woodstock, Illinois
- Rochester Cemetery, Cedar County, Iowa, established 1830s on 13.5 acres (5.5 ha; 0.055 km^{2}) of hills in sand prairie-savanna grassland near the Cedar River
- Smith Cemetery Prairie Nature Preserve, Darby Township, Madison County, Ohio
- Sumnerville Cemetery, Cass County, Michigan
- Tomlinson Cemetery, Champaign County, Illinois
- Weston Cemetery Prairie, Yates Township, McLean County, Illinois

== See also ==
- Insular biogeography
- Sacred grove
- Involuntary park
- Urban prairie
- List of protected grasslands of North America
