= Weston Cemetery Prairie =

Tallgrass prairie remnant in Illinois

Coordinates: 40.7468°N 88.6142°W

- Nearest city: Weston, McLean County, Illinois
- Area: 2.2 ha (5.4 acres)
- Established: April 1972

The Weston Cemetery Prairie is a mesic tallgrass prairie remnant, described variously as being 5.61 acres (2.2 hectares) or 3.2 acres (1.3 hectares) in size, located 0.5 miles (0.8 km) east of Weston, Illinois, an unincorporated community in McLean County, Illinois. Weston Cemetery Prairie is a remnant of the vast tallgrass, black soil prairies that once covered more than 13 million acres of Illinois. This cemetery prairie is listed as a Category I site on the Illinois Natural Areas Inventory and is actively managed with periodic burns and exotic species control efforts.

== History ==
Weston Prairie is a surviving fragment from a parcel of land that was set aside by early residents in 1870 to serve as a township cemetery. The Weston Cemetery Company in 1869 or 1870 purchased 5 acres (2.0 ha) from local resident Anton Adam, who with his wife Cynthia reserved three plots within the cemetery for the family, according to an 1884 deed filed with the office of the McLean County Recorder. Although the parcel appears to have fallen out of active use as a burial ground around 1900, part of the parcel escaped the plow and was still in existence in the 1970s when surviving fragments of Illinois tallgrass prairie were located and inventoried. According to available records, more than 80 people have been laid to rest at the cemetery, with the earliest known burial believed to be 1870 or 1871, and the latest in 1955 or 1956, though most of the burials occurred between 1880 and 1915.

== Description ==
The main 3.5-acre block (1.4 ha) of high-quality prairie is owned by Yates Township and managed by the ParkLands Foundation. A narrow buffer strip that extends back to Weston along the southern edge of the train tracks was donated to the Natural Land Institute (NLI) by Florabelle (Adam) Kelleher in 1982, and the NLI donated it to the ParkLands Foundation in 1986. Florabelle Kelleher was the granddaughter of Anton and Cynthia Adam. Her sister, Iva "Pearl” Adam was interred at Weston Cemetery on Dec. 6, 1900.

The prairie is noted for exceptional plant diversity, with nearly 100 separate species identified on the tiny site. Forbs include the dwarf prairie rose, prairie shooting star, spiderwort, prairie gentian, compassplant, and woody betony. According to a count by botanist Roger Anderson, distinguished professor emeritus at ISU, Weston Cemetery contains 71 native prairie plant species, as well as 47 introduced plants. Prairie flowers on the site include four species of aster (sky blue, heath, smooth and hairy); three types of sunflowers (sawtooth, false and prairie); four goldenrods (tall, grass-leaved, early and rigid); dog bane; cream wild indigo; false toadflax; downy gentian; spiked lobelia; violet wood sorrel; false dragonhead; common mountain mint; and many others. Prairie grasses found at the cemetery include big bluestem and little blue stem, yellow star, blue-eyed, prairie dropseed and Indian grass. Current management practices being implemented to protect the prairie habitat are prescribed burning and exotic species control.

== Access ==
From U.S. Route 24, access to the prairie can be achieved by means of a half-mile-long ungraded dirt road easement. There are no trails at the cemetery prairie, so visitors are encouraged to tread lightly. Large groups are discouraged, and visitors are prohibited from collecting plants or seeds.

The nearest limited-access highway interchange is Exit 187 on Interstate 55.

== See also ==
- List of protected grasslands of North America
