= False sunflower =

False sunflower is a common name for several plants and may refer to:

- Heliopsis, especially:
  - Heliopsis helianthoides, native to eastern and central North America
- Phoebanthus
