= Philactis =

Scientific classification
- Kingdom: Plantae
- Clade: Tracheophytes
- Clade: Angiosperms
- Clade: Eudicots
- Clade: Asterids
- Order: Asterales
- Family: Asteraceae
- Subfamily: Asteroideae
- Tribe: Heliantheae
- Subtribe: Zinniinae
- Genus: Philactis; Schrad.

Type species
- Philactis zinnioides Schrad.

Genus of flowering plants

Philactis is a genus of Mexican plants in the tribe Heliantheae within the family Asteraceae.

Species

- Philactis fayi A.M.Torres - Michoacán
- Philactis nelsonii (Greenm.) S.F.Blake - Chiapas, Oaxaca
- Philactis zinnioides Schrad. - Chiapas, Oaxaca, Michoacán, Hidalgo

formerly included

see Heliopsis

- Philactis longipes A.Gray - Heliopsis longipes (A.Gray) S.F.Blake
