= Heliopsis lanceolata =

Scientific classification
- Kingdom: Plantae
- Clade: Tracheophytes
- Clade: Angiosperms
- Clade: Eudicots
- Clade: Asterids
- Order: Asterales
- Family: Asteraceae
- Genus: Heliopsis
- Species: H. lanceolata

Binomial name
- Heliopsis lanceolata S.F.Blake

Species of flowering plant

Heliopsis lanceolata is a rare South American species of flowering plant in the family Asteraceae. It has been found only in Colombia. It, H. canescens, and H. decumbens are the only three known species of their genus endemic to South America. All the other species are indigenous to North America, with one (H. buphthalmoides) found on both continents.
