= Heliopsis decumbens =

Scientific classification
- Kingdom: Plantae
- Clade: Tracheophytes
- Clade: Angiosperms
- Clade: Eudicots
- Clade: Asterids
- Order: Asterales
- Family: Asteraceae
- Genus: Heliopsis
- Species: H. decumbens

Binomial name
- Heliopsis decumbens S.F.Blake 1940

Species of plant

Heliopsis decumbens is a rare South American species of flowering plant in the family Asteraceae. It has been found only in Peru. It, H. canescens, and H. lanceolata are the only three known species of their genus endemic to South America. All the other species are indigenous to North America, with one (H. buphthalmoides) found on both continents.
