= Weston, Illinois =

Weston, Illinois may refer to:

- Weston, DuPage County, Illinois - a now-defunct town in Dupage County that voted itself out of existence to provide a location for the Fermilab National Accelerator Laboratory.
- Weston, McLean County, Illinois - a tiny unincorporated village in McLean County.
