= Sialogogue =

Substance that increases flow of saliva

A sialogogue (also spelled sialagogue, ptysmagogue or ptyalagogue) is a substance, especially a medication, that increases the flow rate of saliva. The definition focuses on substances that promote production or secretion of saliva (proximal causation) rather than any food that is mouthwatering (distal causation that triggers proximal causation).

Sialogogues can be used in the treatment of xerostomia (the subjective feeling of having a dry mouth), to stimulate any functioning salivary gland tissue to produce more saliva. Saliva has a bactericidal effect, so when low levels of it are secreted, the risk of caries increases. Not only this, but fungal infections such as oral candidosis also can be a consequence of low salivary flow rates. The buffer effect of saliva is also important, neutralising acids that cause tooth enamel demineralisation.

== Usage in dentistry ==
The following are used in dentistry to treat xerostomia:

- Parasympathomimetic drugs act on parasympathetic muscarinic receptors to induce an increased saliva flow. The M3 receptor has been identified as the principal target to increase salivary flow rates. Pilocarpine is an example; the maximum dose of this drug is 30 mg/day. Contraindications include many lung conditions, such as asthma, cardiac problems, epilepsy and Parkinson's disease; side effects include flushing, increased urination, increase perspiration, and GI disturbances.
- Chewing gum induces stimulated saliva secretion of the minor salivary glands in the oral cavity. During mastication (chewing), the resultant compression forces acting on the periodontal ligament cause the stimulated release of gingival crevicular fluid. Further salivation can be also achieved by the stimulation of taste receptors (parasympathetic fibers from the chorda tympani and the lingual nerve are involved).
- Malic and ascorbic acid are effective sialogogues, but are not ideal as they cause demineralisation of tooth enamel.

== Historical source from plants ==
A tincture is prepared from the root of the pyrethrium (pyrethrum) or pellitory (a number of plants in the Chrysanthemum family). It is found growing in Levant and parts of Limerick and Clare in Ireland. The root powder was used as flavouring in tooth powders in the past.

=== Herbs with sialogogue action ===
- Bloodroot (Sanguinaria canadensis)
- Blue flag (Iris versicolor)
- Cayenne pepper (Capsicum annuum)
- Centaury (Centaurium erythraea)
- Chilcoatl / Azteca gold root (Heliopsis longipes)
- Great yellow gentian (Gentiana lutea)
- Jambu (Acmella oleracea)
- Ginger (Zingiber officinale)
- Northern prickly-ash (Zanthoxylum americanum)
- Senega (Polygala senega)

== See also ==
- Hypersalivation
