= List of Heterospilus species =

This is a list of 131 species in Heterospilus, a genus of wasp in the family Braconidae.

== Heterospilus species ==
- Heterospilus aciculatus (Provancher, 1888)^{c g}
- Heterospilus alboapicalis Belokobylskij, 1994^{c g}
- Heterospilus alternicoloratus ^{g}
- Heterospilus annulatus Marsh, 1982^{c g}
- Heterospilus annulicornis (Ashmead, 1894)^{c g}
- Heterospilus anobiidivorus Muesebeck, 1939^{c g}
- Heterospilus anthaxiae (Ashmead, 1893)^{c g}
- Heterospilus appalachicola (Viereck, 1905)^{c g}
- Heterospilus arleiophagus Marsh & Melo, 1999^{c g}
- Heterospilus ater Fischer, 1960^{c g}
- Heterospilus atratus (Ashmead, 1890)^{c g}
- Heterospilus atriceps (Ashmead, 1893)^{c g}
- Heterospilus baeticatus (Provancher, 1880)^{c g}
- Heterospilus balicyba ^{g}
- Heterospilus boliviensis Szepligeti, 1906^{c g}
- Heterospilus brachyptera (Jakimavicius, 1968)^{c g}
- Heterospilus brasilophagus Marsh & Melo, 1999^{c g}
- Heterospilus breviatus Shi, Yang & Chen, 2002^{c g}
- Heterospilus brevicornalus Shi & Chen, 2004^{c g}
- Heterospilus bruchi Viereck, 1910^{c g}
- Heterospilus caesus (Nees, 1834)^{c g}
- Heterospilus cancellatus Shi, 2002^{c g}
- Heterospilus caophongensis Belokobylskij, 1994^{c g}
- Heterospilus ceballosi (Docavo Alberti, 1960)^{c g}
- Heterospilus cephi Rohwer, 1925^{c g}
- Heterospilus chinensis Chen & Shi, 2004^{c g}
- Heterospilus chittendenii (Ashmead, 1893)^{c g}
- Heterospilus chui ^{g}
- Heterospilus concolor (Szepligeti, 1906)^{c g}
- Heterospilus consimilis (Ashmead, 1893)^{c g}
- Heterospilus corsicus (Marshall, 1888)^{c g}
- Heterospilus curvisulcus ^{g}
- Heterospilus densistriatus ^{g}
- Heterospilus discolor (Cresson, 1865)^{c g}
- Heterospilus divisus (Wollaston, 1858)^{c g}
- Heterospilus dubitatus Brues, 1912^{c g}
- Heterospilus etiellae Rohwer, 1925^{c g}
- Heterospilus eurostae Viereck, 1917^{c g b}
- Heterospilus extasus Papp, 1987^{c g}
- Heterospilus fasciatus Ashmead, 1894^{c g}
- Heterospilus fasciiventris Brues, 1912^{c g}
- Heterospilus faustinus Marsh, 1982^{c g}
- Heterospilus ferruginus Ashmead, 1894^{c g}
- Heterospilus fischeri Belokobylskij, 1983^{c g}
- Heterospilus flaviceps (Marshall, 1897)^{c g}
- Heterospilus flavicollis (Ashmead, 1893)^{c g}
- Heterospilus flavipes (Cameron, 1905)^{c g}
- Heterospilus floridanus (Ashmead, 1893)^{c}
- Heterospilus frommeri Marsh, 1989^{c g}
- Heterospilus fujianensis ^{g}
- Heterospilus fuscexilis Shaw, 1997^{c g}
- Heterospilus fuscinervis (Cameron, 1887)^{c g}
- Heterospilus genalis Tobias, 1976^{c g}
- Heterospilus gossypii Muesebeck, 1937^{c g}
- Heterospilus gracilis Shi & Chen, 2004^{c g}
- Heterospilus hambletoni Muesebeck, 1937^{c g}
- Heterospilus hemipterus (Thomson, 1892)^{c g}
- Heterospilus hemitestaceus Belokobylskij, 1996^{c g}
- Heterospilus humeralis Ashmead, 1894^{c g}
- Heterospilus hylotrupidis (Ashmead, 1893)^{c g}
- Heterospilus indigenus Belokobylskij, 1983^{c g}
- Heterospilus jianfengensis ^{g}
- Heterospilus joni Marsh, 1982^{c g}
- Heterospilus kerzhneri Belokobylskij & Maeto, 2009^{g}
- Heterospilus koebelei (Ashmead, 1893)^{c g}
- Heterospilus languriae (Ashmead, 1893)^{c g}
- Heterospilus leptosoma Fischer, 1960^{c g}
- Heterospilus leptostyli Rohwer, 1913^{c}
- Heterospilus liopodis (Brues, 1910)^{c g}
- Heterospilus liui ^{g}
- Heterospilus longicaudus (Ashmead, 1893)^{c}
- Heterospilus longiventrius ^{g}
- Heterospilus luculentus (Belokobylskij, 1992)^{c g}
- Heterospilus luridostigmus Marsh, 2002^{c g}
- Heterospilus marchi (Docavo Alberti, 1960)^{c g}
- Heterospilus matthewsi Marsh & Melo, 1999^{c g}
- Heterospilus megalopus Marsh, 1982^{c g}
- Heterospilus melanocephalus Rohwer, 1925^{c g}
- Heterospilus melleus (Ashmead, 1893)^{c}
- Heterospilus meridionalis Brues, 1912^{c g}
- Heterospilus micronesianus Belokobylskij & Maeto, 2008^{c g}
- Heterospilus microstigmi Richards, 1935^{c g}
- Heterospilus minimus Fischer, 1960^{c g}
- Heterospilus mordellistenae Viereck, 1911^{c g}
- Heterospilus nanlingensis ^{g}
- Heterospilus niger (Szepligeti, 1906)^{c}
- Heterospilus nigrescens Ashmead, 1894^{c g}
- Heterospilus nishijimus Belokobylskij & Maeto, 2008^{c g}
- Heterospilus oculatus Belokobylskij, 1988^{c g}
- Heterospilus orientalis Belokobylskij, 1983^{c g}
- Heterospilus pacificola Belokobylskij & Maeto, 2008^{c g}
- Heterospilus pallidipes Ashmead, 1894^{c g}
- Heterospilus paradoxus (Enderlein, 1920)^{c g}
- Heterospilus pectinatus (Enderlein, 1920)^{c}
- Heterospilus pinicola Belokobylskij, 1994^{c g}
- Heterospilus pityophthori (Ashmead, 1893)^{c g}
- Heterospilus prodigiosus ^{g}
- Heterospilus prodoxi (Riley, 1880)^{c g}
- Heterospilus pronotalis Belokobylskij, Iqbal & Austin, 2004^{c g}
- Heterospilus prosopidis Viereck, 1910^{c g}
- Heterospilus punctatus ^{g}
- Heterospilus qingliangensis ^{g}
- Heterospilus quaestor (Haliday, 1836)^{c g}
- Heterospilus richardsi Marsh & Melo, 1999^{c g}
- Heterospilus rubicola Fischer, 1968^{c g}
- Heterospilus rubrocinctus (Ashmead, 1905)^{c g}
- Heterospilus rufithorax (Cresson, 1865)^{c g}
- Heterospilus scolyticida (Ashmead, 1893)^{c g}
- Heterospilus selandriae (Ashmead, 1889)^{c g}
- Heterospilus semidepressus ^{g}
- Heterospilus separatus Fischer, 1960^{c g}
- Heterospilus setosiscutum ^{g}
- Heterospilus setosus ^{g}
- Heterospilus shawi Marsh, Wild & Whitfield, 2013^{g}
- Heterospilus shoshonea (Viereck, 1907)^{c g}
- Heterospilus sicanus (Marshall, 1888)^{c g}
- Heterospilus striatiscutum Belokobylskij & Maeto, 2008^{c g}
- Heterospilus striatus Muesebeck & Walkley, 1951^{c g}
- Heterospilus tadzhicus Belokobylskij, 1983^{c g}
- Heterospilus tauricus Telenga, 1941^{c g}
- Heterospilus tenuitergum ^{g}
- Heterospilus terminalis Ashmead, 1900^{c g}
- Heterospilus testaceus (Cameron, 1905)^{c}
- Heterospilus tirnax Papp, 1987^{c g}
- Heterospilus tulyensis Belokobylskij, 1994^{c g}
- Heterospilus variegatus Ashmead, 1894^{c g}
- Heterospilus vilasi (Docavo Alberti, 1960)^{c g}
- Heterospilus watanabei Belokobylskij & Maeto, 2008^{c g}
- Heterospilus wuyiensis Chen & Shi, 2004^{c g}
- Heterospilus zaykovi van Achterberg, 1992^{c g}
- Heterospilus zeteki Rohwer, 1925^{c g}

Data sources: i = ITIS, c = Catalogue of Life, g = GBIF, b = Bugguide.net
