= Heliopsis filifolia =

Scientific classification
- Kingdom: Plantae
- Clade: Tracheophytes
- Clade: Angiosperms
- Clade: Eudicots
- Clade: Asterids
- Order: Asterales
- Family: Asteraceae
- Genus: Heliopsis
- Species: H. filifolia

Binomial name
- Heliopsis filifolia S.Watson 1890

Species of flowering plant

Heliopsis filifolia is a rare species of flowering plant in the family Asteraceae. It has been found only in the state of Coahuila in northern Mexico.
