= Heliopsis parvifolia =

Scientific classification
- Kingdom: Plantae
- Clade: Embryophytes
- Clade: Tracheophytes
- Clade: Spermatophytes
- Clade: Angiosperms
- Clade: Eudicots
- Clade: Asterids
- Order: Asterales
- Family: Asteraceae
- Tribe: Heliantheae
- Genus: Heliopsis
- Species: H. parvifolia

Binomial name
- Heliopsis parvifolia A.Gray

Species of flowering plant

Heliopsis parvifolia is a North American species of flowering plant in the family Asteraceae, known by the common name mountain oxeye.

== Range and Habitat ==
Heliopsis parvifolia is native to northern Mexico from Baja California east to Tamaulipas and south as far as Aguascalientes, as well as the southwestern United States (southern Arizona, southern New Mexico, western Texas). It grows on open rocky mountain slopes and canyons at elevations between 1200 and 2500 meters.

== Description ==
Heliopsis parvifolia is a perennial herb up to 80 cm (31 in) tall, spreading by means of underground rhizomes. The plant generally produces 1-5 flower heads per stem. Each head contains 6-19 bright yellow ray florets surrounding 40 or more yellowish-brown disc florets. The fruit is an achene about 5 mm (0.20 in) long.
