= Heliopsis annua =

Scientific classification
- Kingdom: Plantae
- Clade: Tracheophytes
- Clade: Angiosperms
- Clade: Eudicots
- Clade: Asterids
- Order: Asterales
- Family: Asteraceae
- Tribe: Heliantheae
- Genus: Heliopsis
- Species: H. annua

Binomial name
- Heliopsis annua Hemsl. 1881

Species of flowering plant

Heliopsis annua is a species of flowering plant in the family Asteraceae. It is widespread across much of northern and central Mexico from Chihuahua and Coahuila as far south as Puebla and Michoacán.
