= Heliopsis parviceps =

Scientific classification
- Kingdom: Plantae
- Clade: Tracheophytes
- Clade: Angiosperms
- Clade: Eudicots
- Clade: Asterids
- Order: Asterales
- Family: Asteraceae
- Genus: Heliopsis
- Species: H. parviceps

Binomial name
- Heliopsis parviceps S.F.Blake 1943

Species of flowering plant

Heliopsis parviceps is a Mexican species of flowering plant in the family Asteraceae. It is native western Mexico in the states of Sinaloa, Michoacán, Guerrero, and México.
