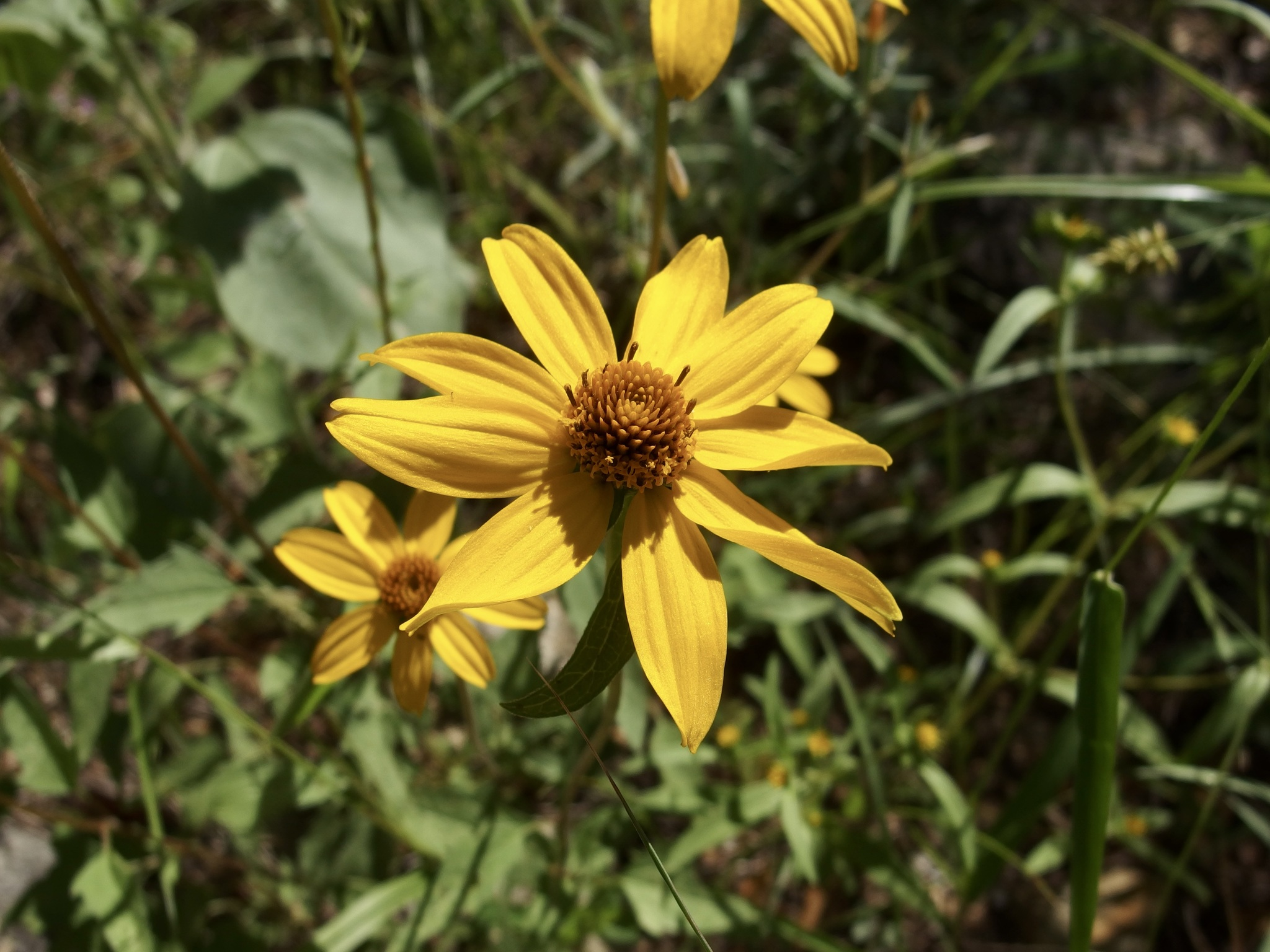

Scientific classification
- Kingdom: Plantae
- Clade: Tracheophytes
- Clade: Angiosperms
- Clade: Eudicots
- Clade: Asterids
- Order: Asterales
- Family: Asteraceae
- Genus: Heliopsis
- Species: H. procumbens

Binomial name
- Heliopsis procumbens Hemsl. 1881

= Heliopsis procumbens =

Species of flowering plant

Heliopsis procumbens is a species of flowering plant in the family Asteraceae. It is native to central Mexico from Jalisco and Michoacán east to Veracruz. Its daisy-like flowers, which have a diameter of 2-3 inches and yellow-orange rays encircling brownish-yellow center cones, are characteristic of its typical 3–4-foot growth. Throughout the summer, flowers bloom on stiff stems covered in up to six-inch-long, ovate, toothed leaves.
