= Heliopsis novogaliciana =

Scientific classification
- Kingdom: Plantae
- Clade: Tracheophytes
- Clade: Angiosperms
- Clade: Eudicots
- Clade: Asterids
- Order: Asterales
- Family: Asteraceae
- Genus: Heliopsis
- Species: H. novogaliciana

Binomial name
- Heliopsis novogaliciana B.L.Turner 1987

Species of flowering plant

Heliopsis novogaliciana is a Mexican species of flowering plant in the family Asteraceae. It is native western Mexico in the Sierra Madre Occidental in the states of Jalisco, Nayarit, Sinaloa, Chihuahua and Durango.
