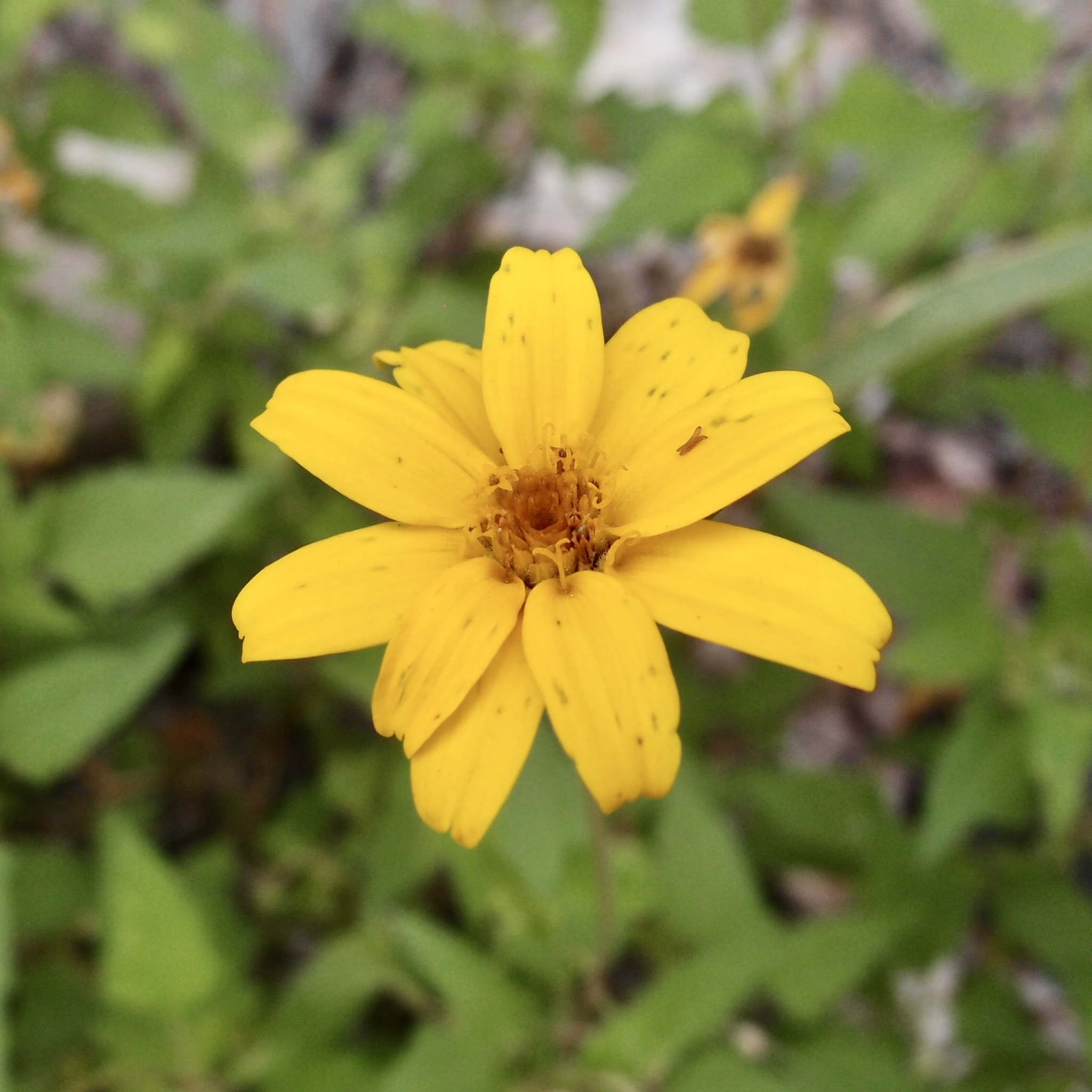

Scientific classification
- Kingdom: Plantae
- Clade: Tracheophytes
- Clade: Angiosperms
- Clade: Eudicots
- Clade: Asterids
- Order: Asterales
- Family: Asteraceae
- Genus: Heliopsis
- Species: H. anomala

Binomial name
- Heliopsis anomala (M.E.Jones) B.L.Turner

Synonyms
- Encelia anomala M.E. Jones 1933

= Heliopsis anomala =

Species of flowering plant

Heliopsis anomala is a Mexican species of flowering plant in the family Asteraceae. It is native to northwestern Mexico in mountains and canyons near the Gulf of California. It has been found in both states of the Baja California Peninsula as well as in Sonora (including Isla Tiburón).
