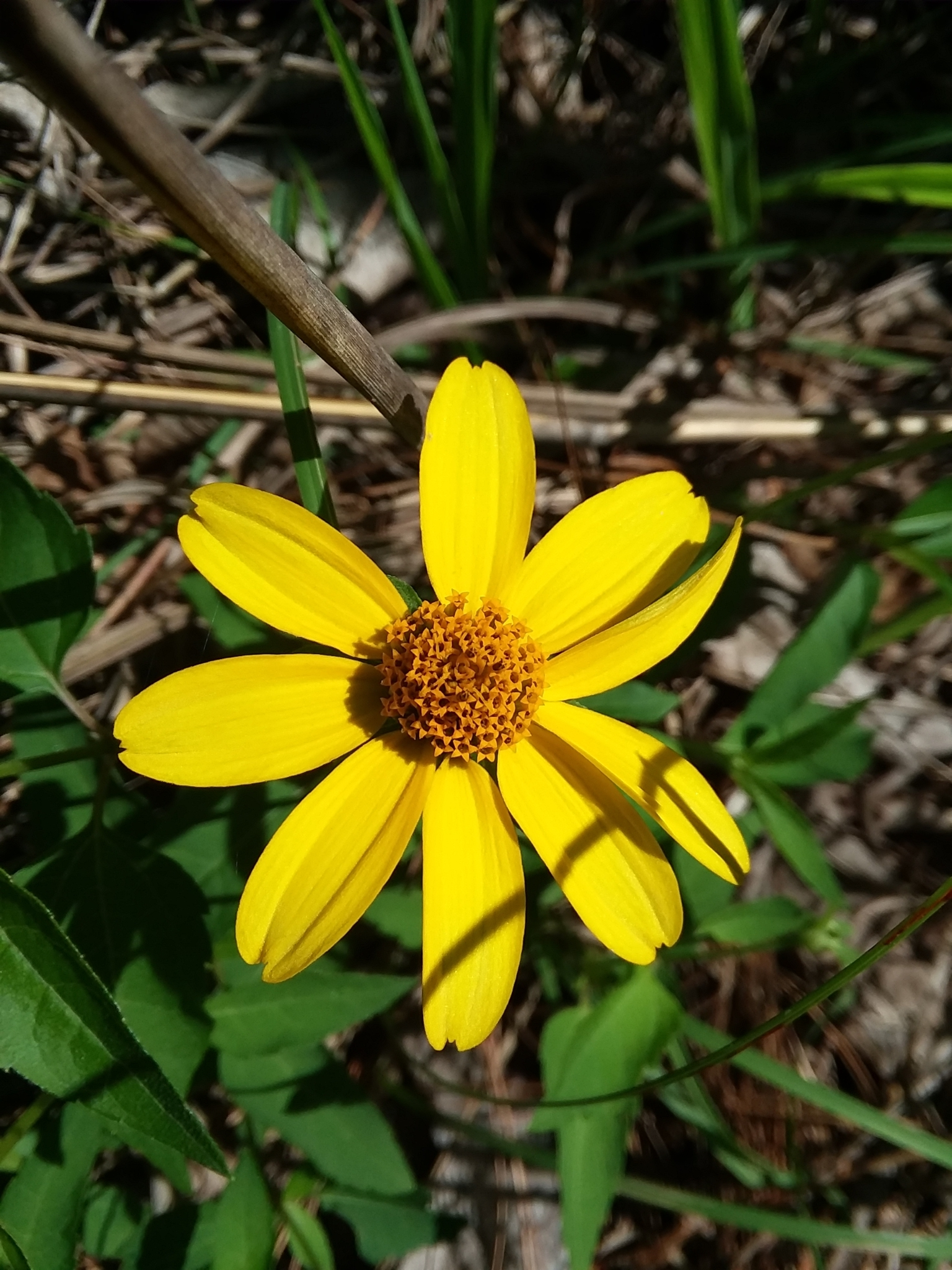

Scientific classification
- Kingdom: Plantae
- Clade: Tracheophytes
- Clade: Angiosperms
- Clade: Eudicots
- Clade: Asterids
- Order: Asterales
- Family: Asteraceae
- Tribe: Heliantheae
- Genus: Heliopsis
- Species: H. gracilis

Binomial name
- Heliopsis gracilis Nutt. 1840

Synonyms
- Heliopsis helianthoides var. gracilis (Nutt.) Gandhi & R.D.Thomas; Heliopsis laevis var. minor Hook.

= Heliopsis gracilis =

Species of flowering plant

Heliopsis gracilis is a North American species of flowering plant in the family Asteraceae, known by the common names costal plain oxeye, costal plain sunflower-everlasting, smooth oxeye and pinewoods oxeye. It is native to the southeastern and south-central United States from eastern Texas to South Carolina.

Heliopsis gracilis is a perennial herb up to 80 cm (31 in) tall, spreading by means of underground rhizomes. The plant generally produces 1-5 flower heads per stem. Each head contains 6-19 bright yellow ray florets surrounding 40 or more yellowish-brown disc florets. The fruit is an achene about 5 mm long.
