= Heterospilus alternicoloratus =

Scientific classification
- Kingdom: Animalia
- Phylum: Arthropoda
- Class: Insecta
- Order: Hymenoptera
- Family: Braconidae
- Genus: Heterospilus
- Species: H. alternicoloratus

Binomial name
- Heterospilus alternicoloratus Tang et al., 2013

Species of wasp

Heterospilus alternicoloratus is a species of braconid wasp in the family Braconidae. It was described in 2013.
