= Mordellistena aethiops =

Scientific classification
- Domain: Eukaryota
- Kingdom: Animalia
- Phylum: Arthropoda
- Class: Insecta
- Order: Coleoptera
- Suborder: Polyphaga
- Infraorder: Cucujiformia
- Family: Mordellidae
- Genus: Mordellistena
- Species: M. aethiops

Binomial name
- Mordellistena aethiops Smith, 1882

Species of beetle

Mordellistena aethiops is a species of beetle in the genus Mordellistena of the family Mordellidae discovered in 1882. Its larvae feed on the stems of Silphium laciniatum.
