= Heliopsis sinaloensis =

Scientific classification
- Kingdom: Plantae
- Clade: Tracheophytes
- Clade: Angiosperms
- Clade: Eudicots
- Clade: Asterids
- Order: Asterales
- Family: Asteraceae
- Genus: Heliopsis
- Species: H. sinaloensis

Binomial name
- Heliopsis sinaloensis B.L.Turner 1987

Species of flowering plant

Heliopsis sinaloensis is a rare species of flowering plant in the family Asteraceae. It has been found only in the state of Sinaloa in northwestern Mexico.
