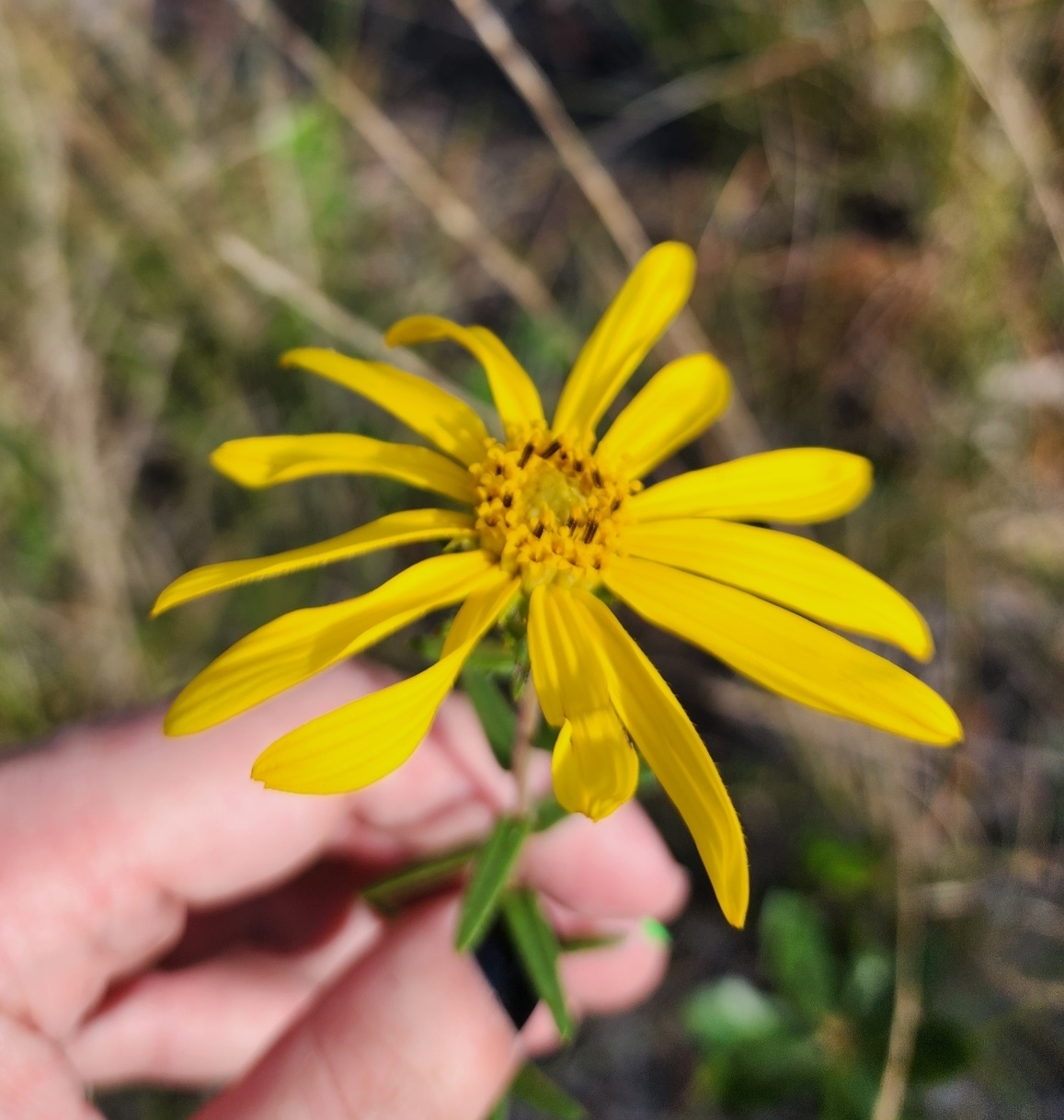

Conservation status
- Vulnerable (NatureServe)

Scientific classification
- Kingdom: Plantae
- Clade: Tracheophytes
- Clade: Angiosperms
- Clade: Eudicots
- Clade: Asterids
- Order: Asterales
- Family: Asteraceae
- Tribe: Heliantheae
- Genus: Phoebanthus
- Species: P. grandiflorus

Binomial name
- Phoebanthus grandiflorus Torr., A.Gray

= Phoebanthus grandiflorus =

Species of flowering plant

Phoebanthus grandiflorus, commonly called Florida false sunflower, is a species of perennial flowering plant endemic to peninsular Florida in the U.S.

== Habitat ==
It occurs in sandy, fire-dependent pine habitats of Florida including pine flatwoods and longleaf pine sandhill.

== Gallery ==
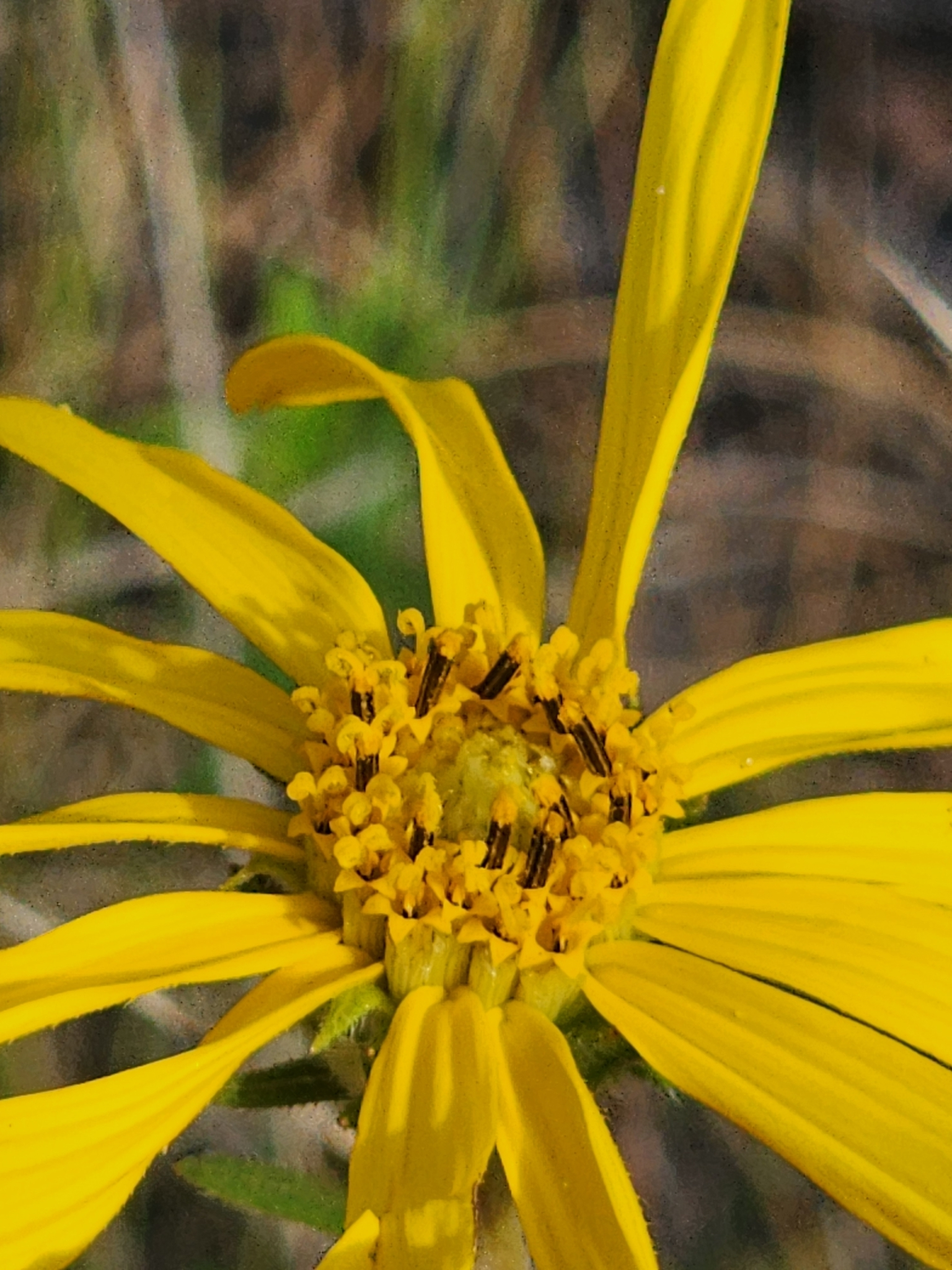
Flower

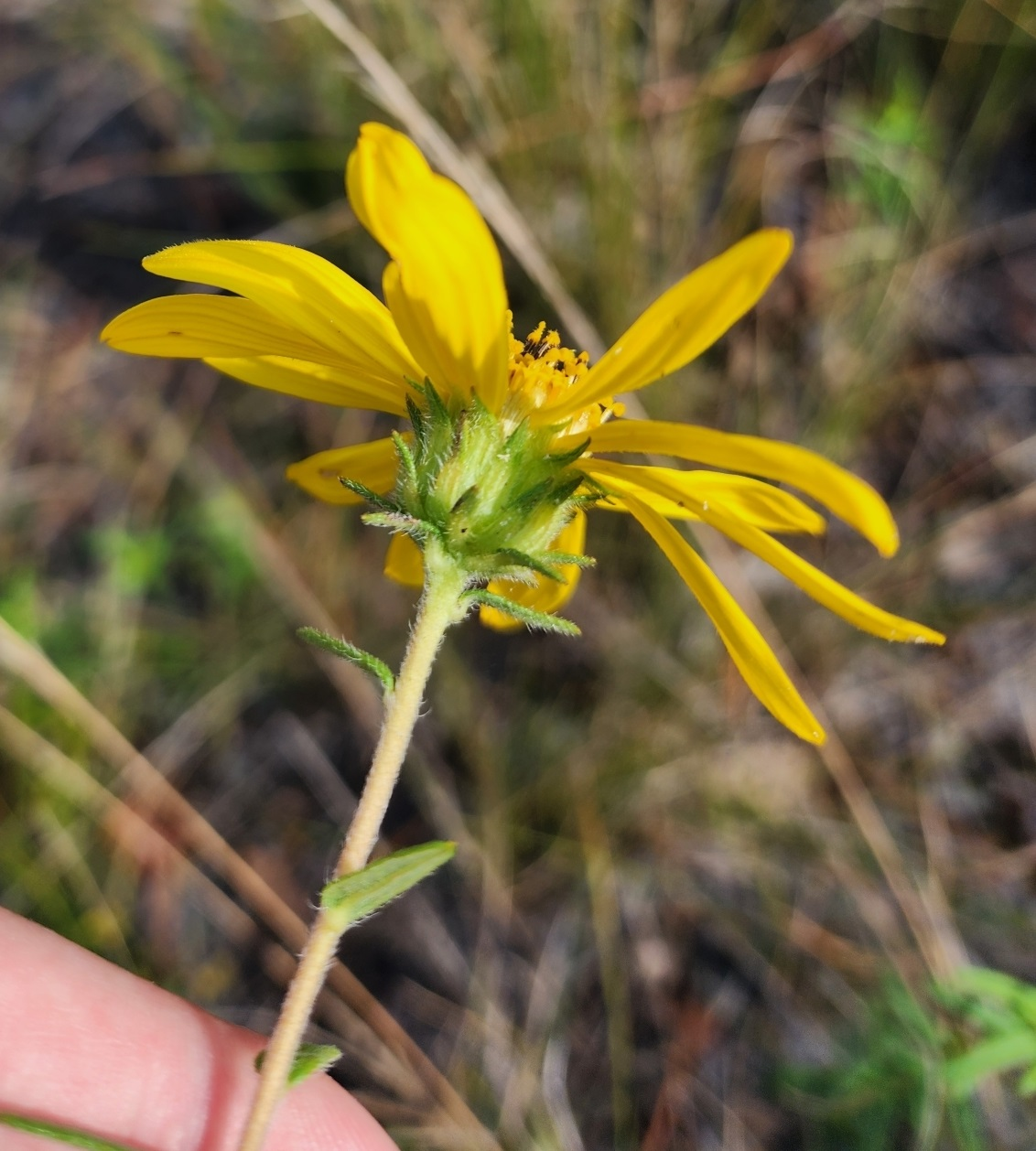
Rear of flower

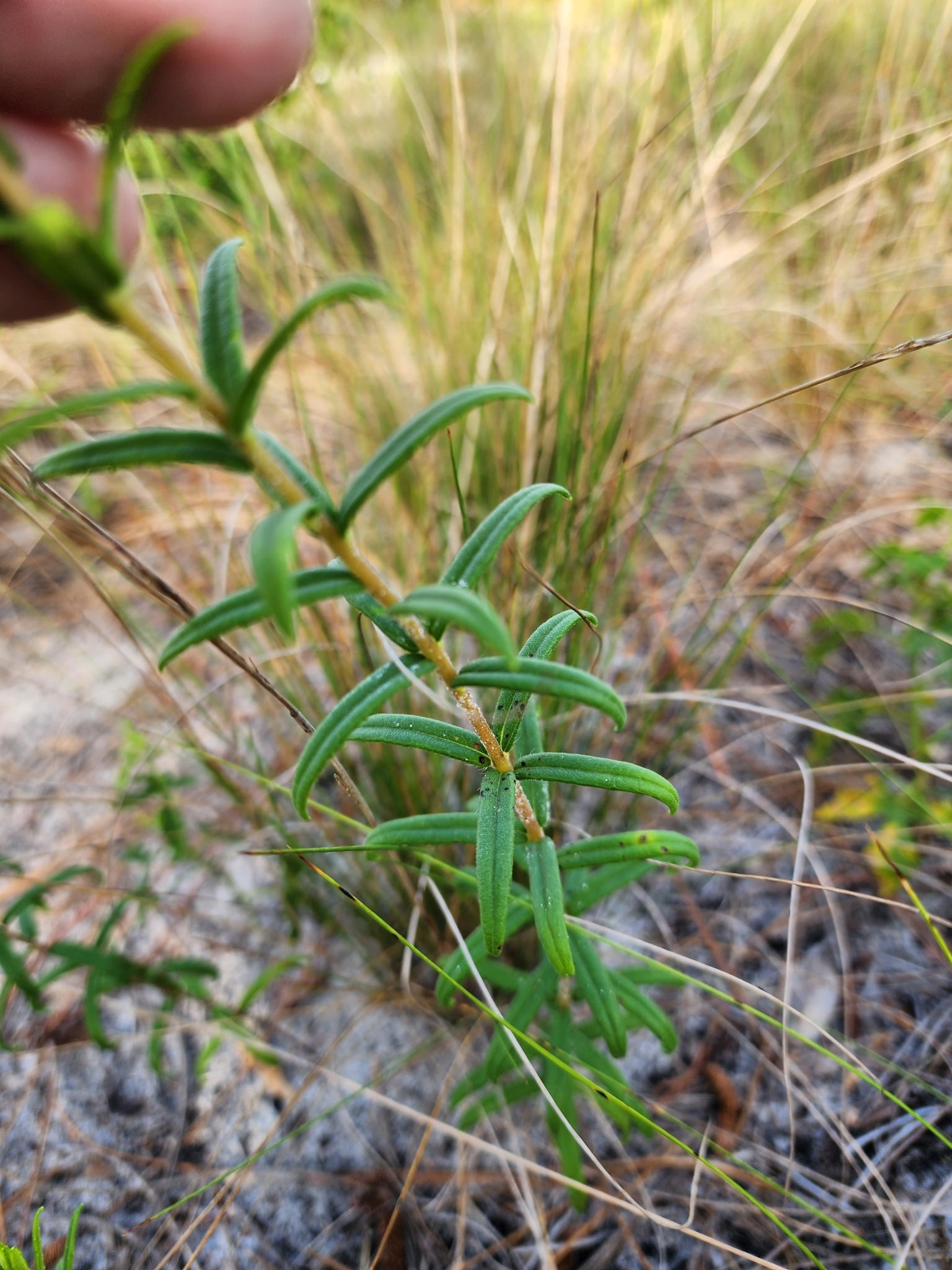
Leaves
