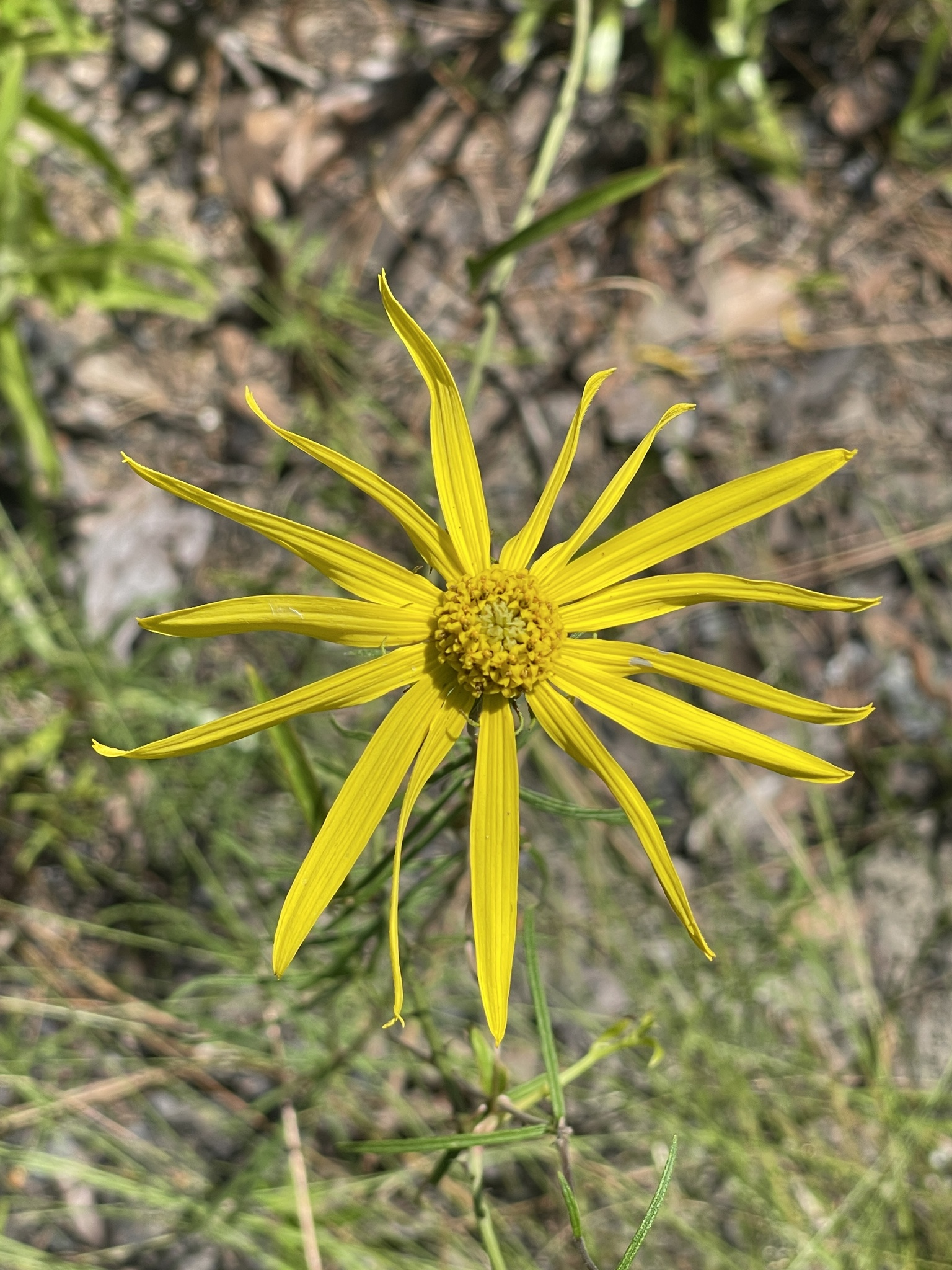
- Phoebanthus tenuifolius

Scientific classification
- Kingdom: Plantae
- Clade: Tracheophytes
- Clade: Angiosperms
- Clade: Eudicots
- Clade: Asterids
- Order: Asterales
- Family: Asteraceae
- Subfamily: Asteroideae
- Tribe: Heliantheae
- Subtribe: Helianthinae
- Genus: Phoebanthus; S.F.Blake

Type species
- Phoebanthus grandiflorus (Torr. & A.Gray) S.F.Blake

= Phoebanthus =

Genus of flowering plants

Phoebanthus, called false sunflower, is a genus of North American plants in the tribe Heliantheae within the family Asteraceae.

Phoebanthus includes two species of herbaceous perennials that are both native to the southeastern United States The genus is a close relative of Helianthus, the genus of the common sunflower, and the plants have the general appearance of a sunflower.

== Taxonomy ==
Phoebanthus is characterized by having a pappus of short scales that are usually persistent (don't fall off) compared to the pappus of two deciduous awns (and sometimes a few scales) in Helianthus, and Phoebanthus is also characterized by a distinctive type of slender, horizontal tuber that forms the perennating organ.

Species

- Phoebanthus tenuifolius is a diploid that occurs in a relatively small area in the panhandle area of Florida, where it occurs in only 4 counties (Calhoun, Franklin, Gulf, and Liberty) and it is listed by the state as a "Threatened Species". It has also been reported from Escambia County in Alabama.
- Phoebanthus grandiflorus is a tetraploid that occurs in peninsular Florida where it has a somewhat broader distribution from Clay and Alachua counties in the north as far south as the area just north of Lake Okeechobee.

The relationship between the two species has never been closely analyzed, but it does not appear that P. grandiflorus is simply an autotetraploid of P. tenuifolius.
