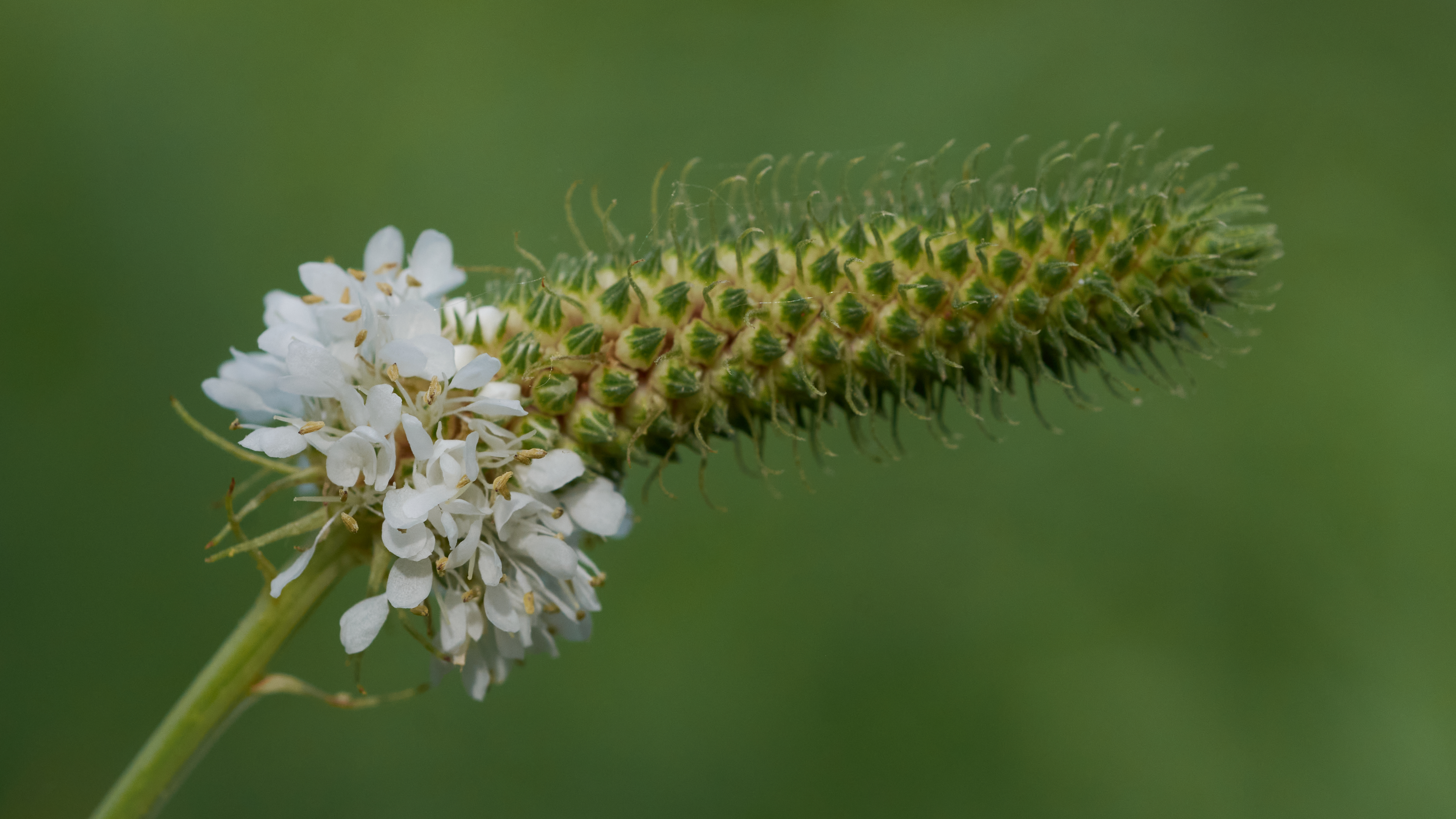

Conservation status
- Secure (NatureServe)

Scientific classification
- Kingdom: Plantae
- Clade: Tracheophytes
- Clade: Angiosperms
- Clade: Eudicots
- Clade: Rosids
- Order: Fabales
- Family: Fabaceae
- Subfamily: Faboideae
- Genus: Dalea
- Species: D. candida

Binomial name
- Dalea candida Willd.

Varieties
- Dalea candida var. candida; Dalea candida var. oligophylla (Torr.) Shinners

Synonyms
- Kuhnistera candida (Willd.) Kuntze; Petalostemon candidus (Willd.) Michx.; Psoralea candida (Willd.) Poir.

= Dalea candida =

Species of flowering plant in the pea family

Dalea candida is a species of flowering plant in the legume family known by the common name white prairie clover. It is native to North America, where it can be found throughout central Canada, the central United States, and northern Mexico. It can sometimes be found outside its range as an introduced species. It grows in many types of habitats, including several types of prairie, foothills, woods, forests, and disturbed areas.

It is a perennial herb growing erect to a maximum height around 1 meter (3 ft 3 in), its taproot growing up to 5 or 6 feet (1.5 or 1.8 m) deep. The alternately arranged leaves are each composed of several narrow, gland-dotted, light green leaflets. The inflorescence is a dense cylindrical spike of flowers at the tip of each stem or stem branch. The spike is packed with the pointed green calyces of sepals, the lower ones bearing corollas of white petals and the higher ones blooming later. The fruit is a green oval legume pod containing one seed.

A specimen of this species was collected by Meriwether Lewis in Nebraska in 1804.

== Uses ==
Among the Ramah Navajo, the candida variety is used for stomachache and as a "life medicine", especially for fever. A compound decoction is used to treat "snake infection" in sheep.

== Ecology ==
It is popular with pollinators and, as it is a legume, it is a nitrogen fixer. It is classified by the USDA as a "high" nitrogen fixer, a category few native plants fit into. It is a larval host to the clouded sulphur, marine blue, Reakirt's blue, and southern dogface.
