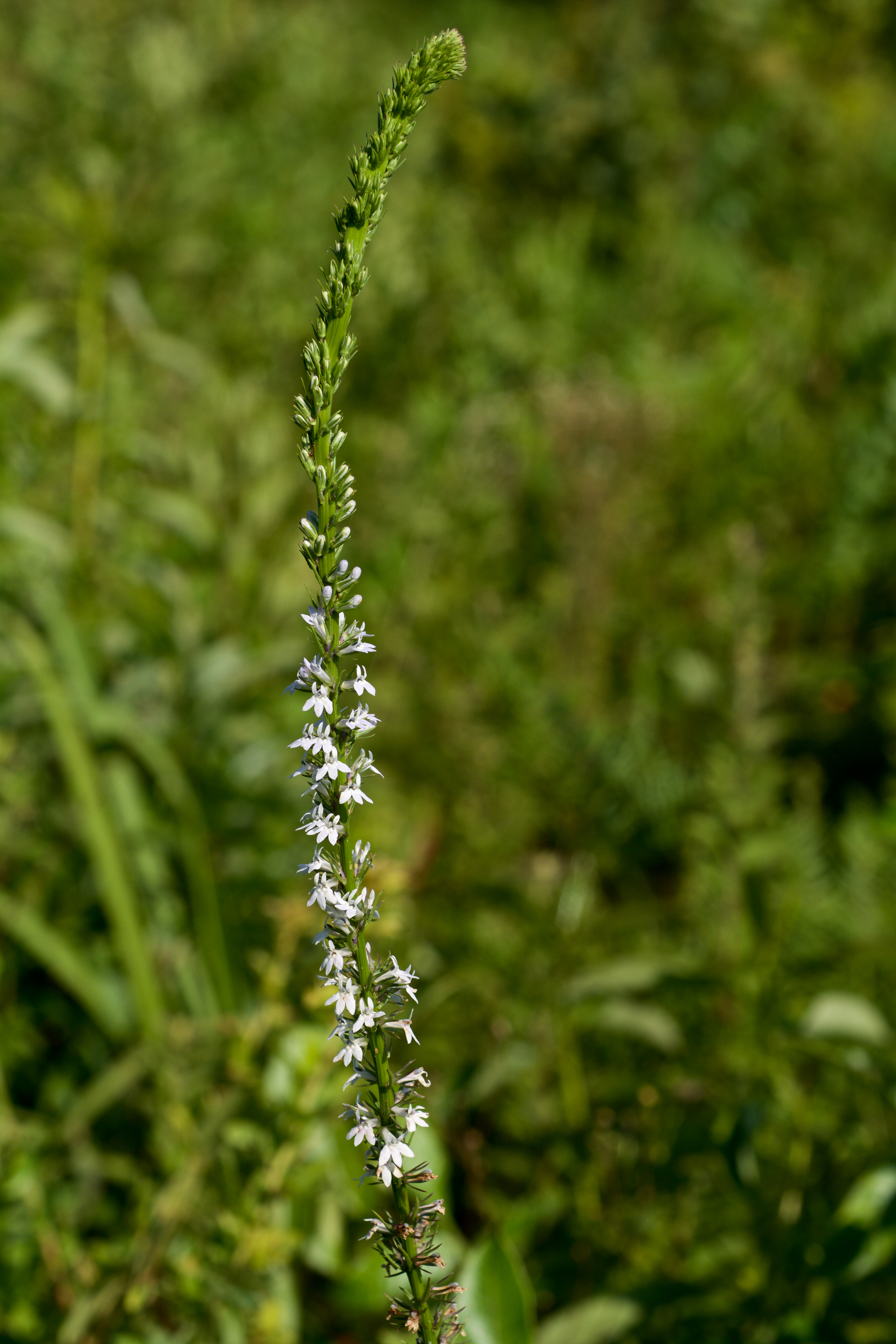

Conservation status
- Least Concern (IUCN 3.1)

Scientific classification
- Kingdom: Plantae
- Clade: Tracheophytes
- Clade: Angiosperms
- Clade: Eudicots
- Clade: Asterids
- Order: Asterales
- Family: Campanulaceae
- Genus: Lobelia
- Species: L. spicata

Binomial name
- Lobelia spicata Lamarck

= Lobelia spicata =

Species of flowering plant

Lobelia spicata, commonly called the pale spiked lobelia, is a flowering plant in the bellflower family.

It is native to North America, where it is widespread in southern Canada and the eastern United States. It is found in a variety of sunny and semi-shade habitats, including prairies, glades, woodlands, and disturbed areas. Several varieties have been recognized across its range, although their distinction is still uncertain.

It is a short-lived perennial, usually flowering below taller grasses and forbs. It produces a spike of white or pale blue flowers in the summer.
