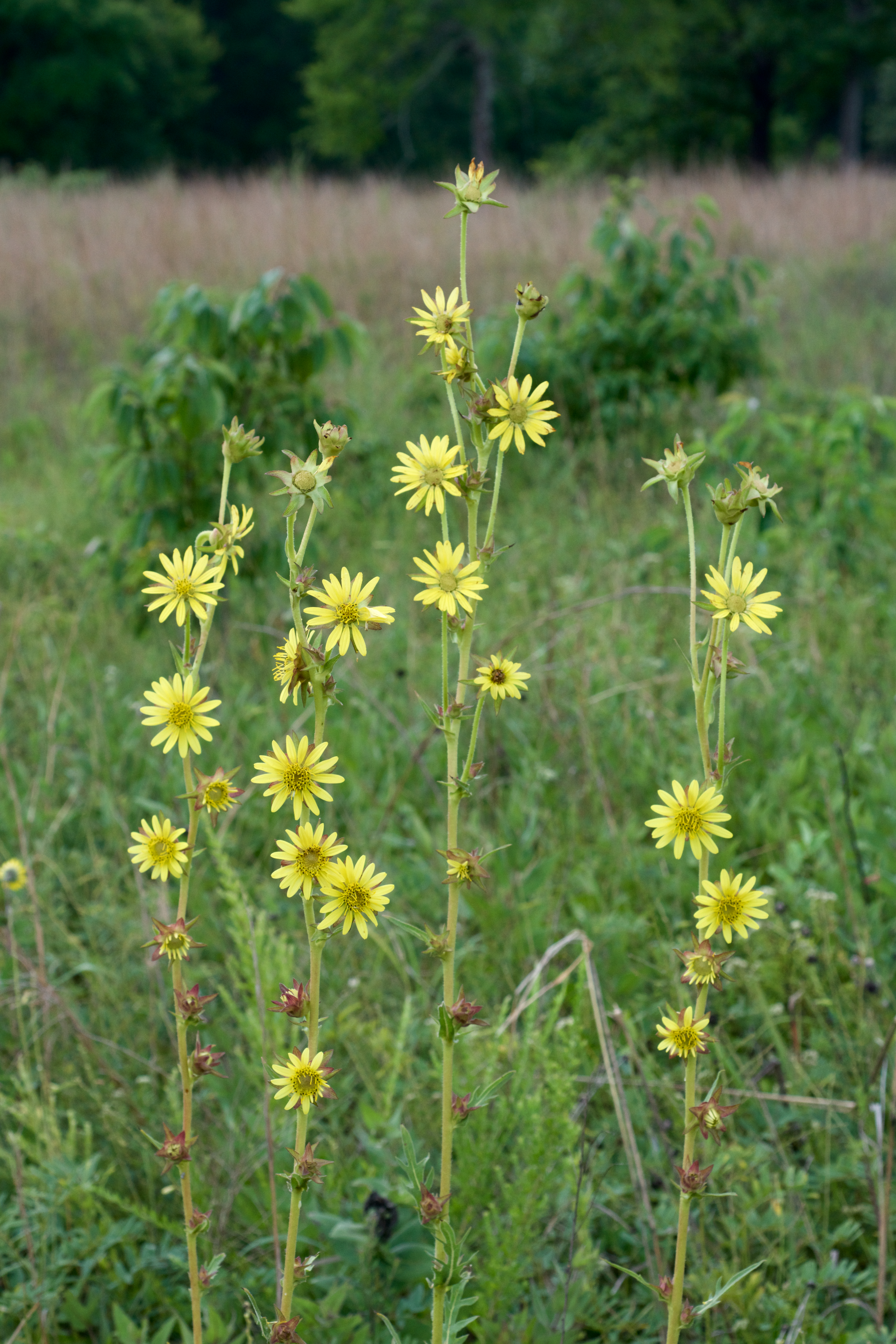

Conservation status
- Secure (NatureServe)

Scientific classification
- Kingdom: Plantae
- Clade: Tracheophytes
- Clade: Angiosperms
- Clade: Eudicots
- Clade: Asterids
- Order: Asterales
- Family: Asteraceae
- Tribe: Heliantheae
- Genus: Silphium
- Species: S. laciniatum

Binomial name
- Silphium laciniatum L.

= Silphium laciniatum =

Species of flowering plant

Silphium laciniatum is a species of flowering plant in the family Asteraceae known commonly as compassplant or compass plant. It is native to North America, where it occurs in Ontario in Canada and the eastern and central United States as far west as New Mexico. Other common names include prairie compass plant, pilotweed, polarplant, gum weed, cut-leaf silphium, and turpentine plant. It is a rosinweed of genus Silphium.

== Description ==
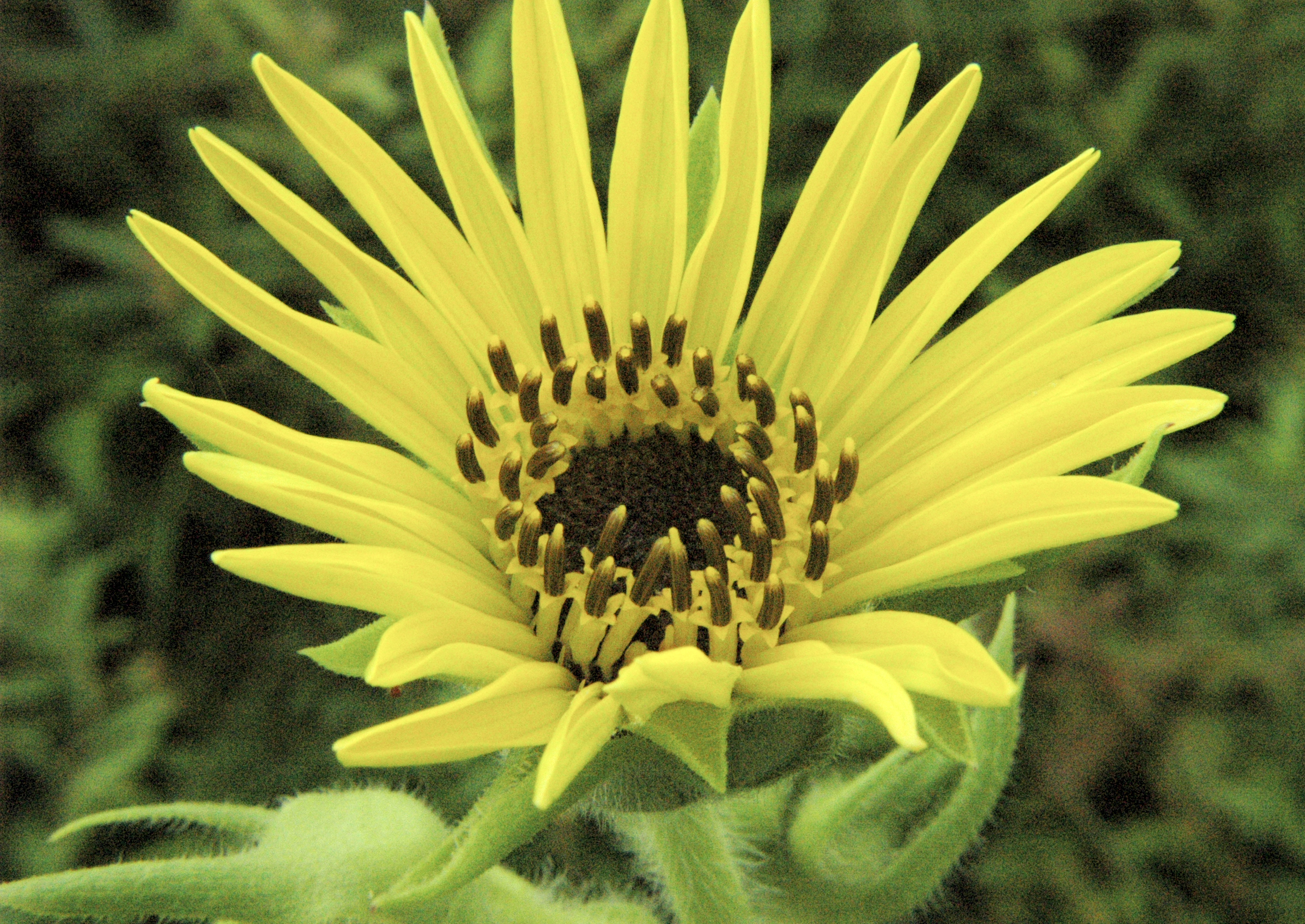
Flower head

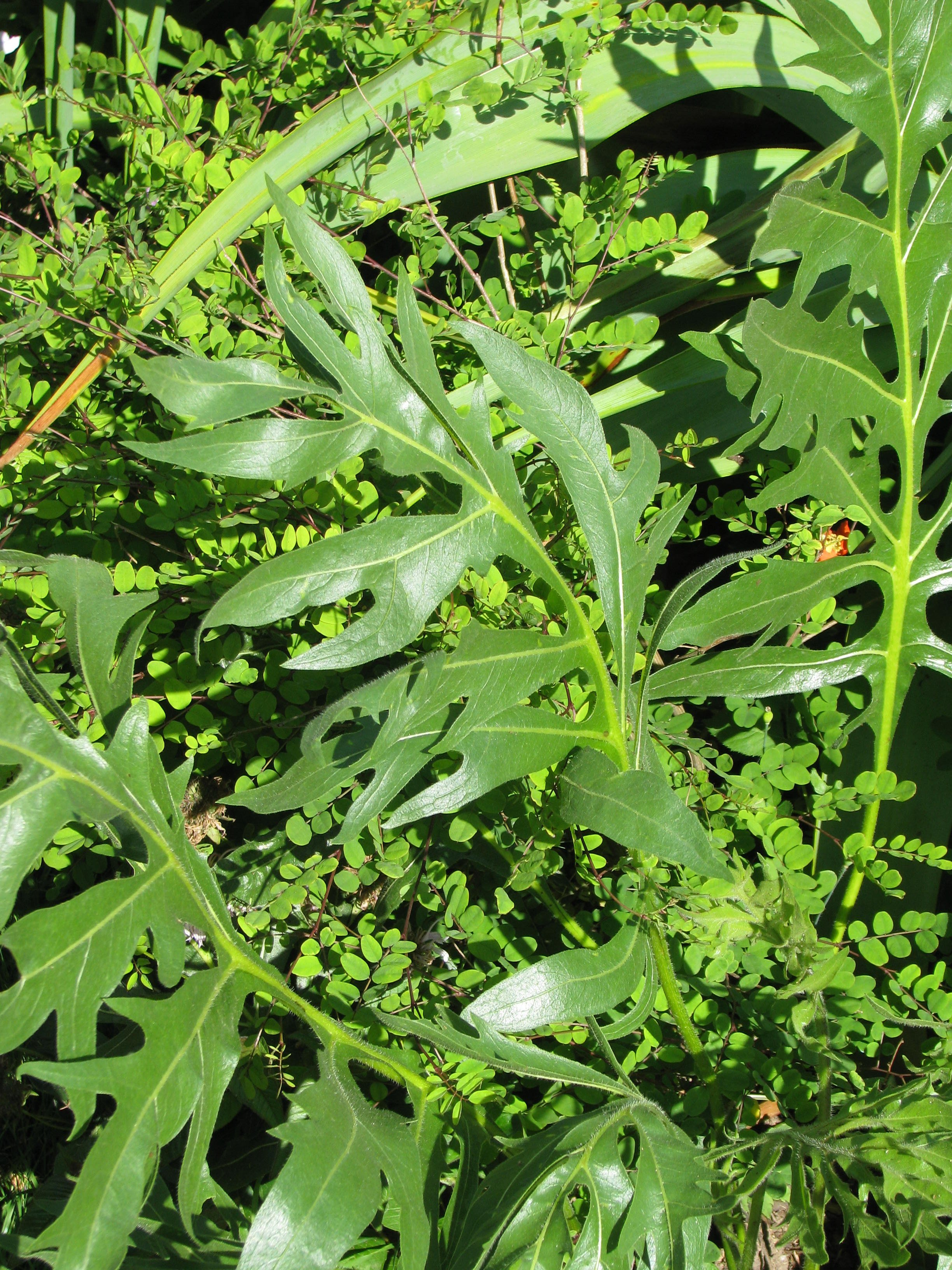
Leaves

This plant is a taprooted perennial herb producing rough-haired stems usually one to three meters tall. The leaves are variable in shape and size, being 4 to 60 cm (1 1/2 to 23 1/2 in) long and 1 to 30 cm (1/2 to 11 3/4 in) wide. They are hairy, smooth-edged or toothed, and borne on petioles or not. The back of the flower head has layers of rough, glandular phyllaries. The head contains 27 to 38 yellow ray florets and many yellow disc florets. The fruit is a cypsela which can be almost 2 cm (3/4 in) long and is tipped with a pappus of two short awns.

== Biology ==
The common name compass plant was inspired by the "compass orientation" of its leaves. The large leaves are held vertically with the tips pointing north or south and the upper and lower surfaces of the blades facing east or west. A newly emerging leaf grows in a random direction, but within two or three weeks it twists on its petiole clockwise or counterclockwise into a vertical position. Studies indicate that the sun's position in the early morning hours influences the twisting orientation. This orientation reduces the amount of solar radiation hitting the leaf surface. Vertical leaves facing east-west have higher water use efficiency than horizontal or north-south-facing blades.

Early settlers on the Great Plains could make their way in the dark by feeling of the leaves.

An early, (if not the earliest) descriptive naming of the compass plant is found in the 1843 hunting trip of William Clark Kennerly, who upon leaving Westport Kansas in May 1843, observed the plant and began its description in his trip: "Westward we went, and still westward, through a flat, arid country with no verdure except the compass plant, which we named for the reason that its large, flat leaves always pointed north and south".

== Ecology ==
Surveys of the insect fauna on typical compass plants have noted many different taxa, often present in large numbers. One plant can produce up to 12 stems. Surveys counted an average of nearly 80 insects on each stem or within its tissues. The vast majority of insects on the stems are the gall wasps Antistrophus rufus and A. minor, and the many types of parasitoids that attack them. The gall wasps, especially A. rufus, inject eggs into the stem, an action that induces the formation of a gall in the plant tissue. The larva of the wasp lives and feeds inside the gall, overwinters there, and emerges as an adult the following spring. Over 600 galls can be in a single stem. The galls are internal in this species, and generally not visible. The adult female A. rufus locates an appropriate site to oviposit by detecting plant volatiles emitted by the fresh growing stem of its host plant, a mix of monoterpenes. The male A. rufus also uses the volatiles in his search for mates. Females mate immediately upon emergence from the gall, and the male uses volatiles to find a gall containing a female, as evidenced by the movements of his antennae upon the plant's surface. He then waits there for her to emerge.

Other insects found in the plant include several species of parasitoid wasps that attack A. rufus larvae in the galls, the two most common being Eurytoma luta and Ormyrus labotus. Others include Eupelmus vesicularis and species of the genera Brasema and Homoporus. The beetle Mordellistena aethiops lives on the plant, its larvae boring into the stems, and it is attacked by parasitoid wasps of the genera Schizopyramnus, Heterospilus, and Tetrastichus.

Many birds and mammals feed on the fruits of the plant. The eastern kingbird perches on the tall plant to watch for insect prey. Livestock find it palatable.

== Uses ==
The plant had a variety of uses among Native American groups. The bitter, resinous sap could be made into a chewing gum. The Pawnee made a tisane ( herbal tea) with it. Many groups burned the dried root as a charm during lightning.

The plant is cultivated in gardens.

== Literature ==
In 1882 Benjamin Alvord reviewed the literature on the plant and offered his observations.

In the environmental classic, A Sand County Almanac, Aldo Leopold devotes much of the July entry to Silphium—its hardiness, but its slow disappearance nevertheless, a harbinger of the fate of the prairie. "It is easy now to predict the future. For a few years my Silphium will try in vain to rise above the mowing machine, and then it will die. With it will die the prairie epoch."
