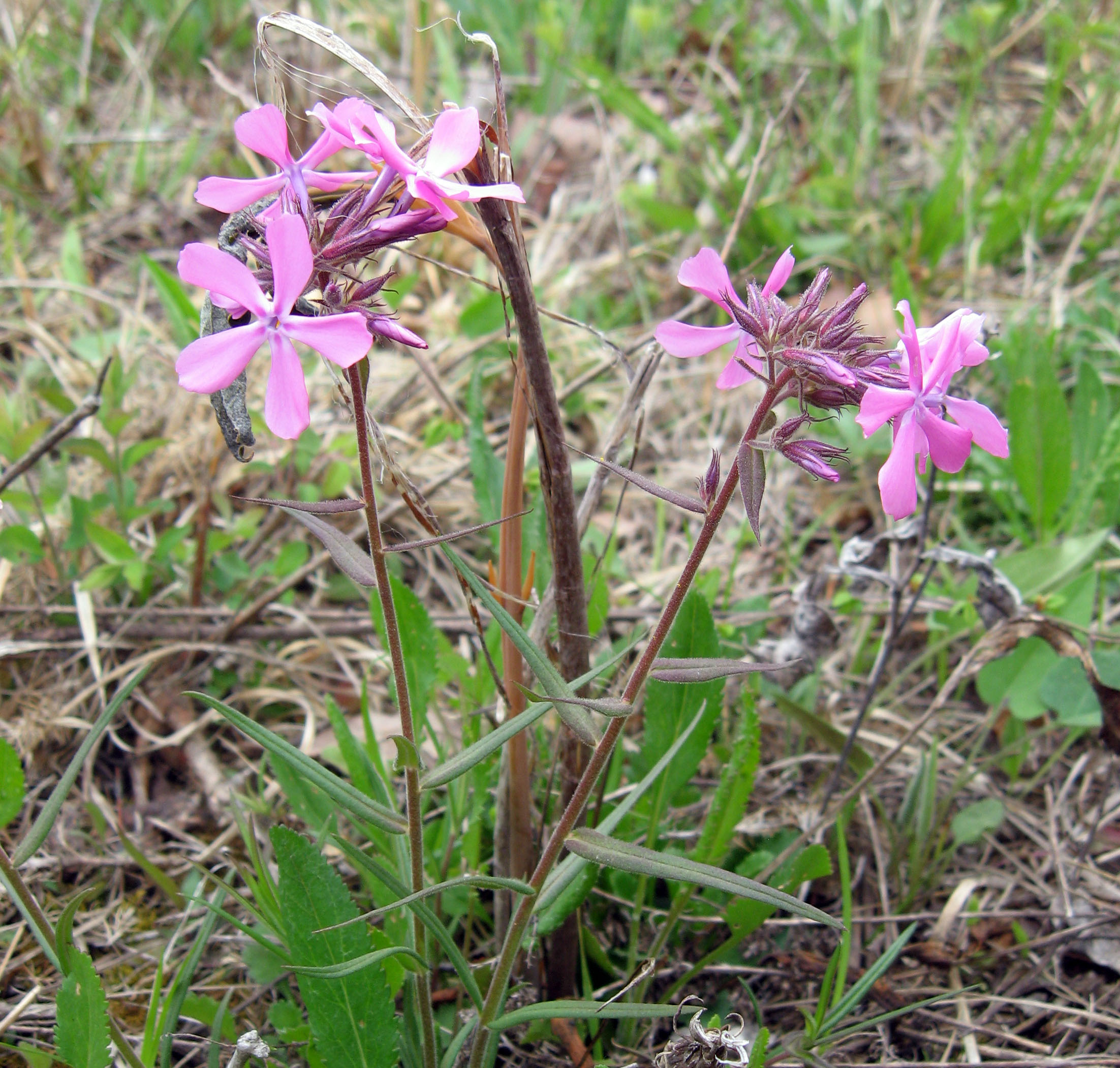

Scientific classification
- Kingdom: Plantae
- Clade: Tracheophytes
- Clade: Angiosperms
- Clade: Eudicots
- Clade: Asterids
- Order: Ericales
- Family: Polemoniaceae
- Genus: Phlox
- Species: P. pilosa

Binomial name
- Phlox pilosa L.

= Phlox pilosa =

Species of flowering plant

Phlox pilosa, the downy phlox or prairie phlox, is an herbaceous plant in the family Polemoniaceae. It is native to eastern North America, where it is found in open areas such as prairies and woodlands.

== Description ==
Downy phlox is a perennial that grows 6–24 in (15–61 cm) high. The stems are upright and sometimes branched near the top. Leaves, stems, and sepals are covered with hairs and the plant is sticky to the touch. Leaves are long and narrow and have pointed tips; they can be up to 3 in (8 cm) long and 1/8–1/2 in (3–13 mm) wide. The flowers grow in rounded clusters up to 3 in (8 cm) at the top of stems. The stems have opposite leaves. Each flower has five lobes (petals) that are pale pink, lavender, or purple, and is 1/2–3/4 in (13–19 mm) across.

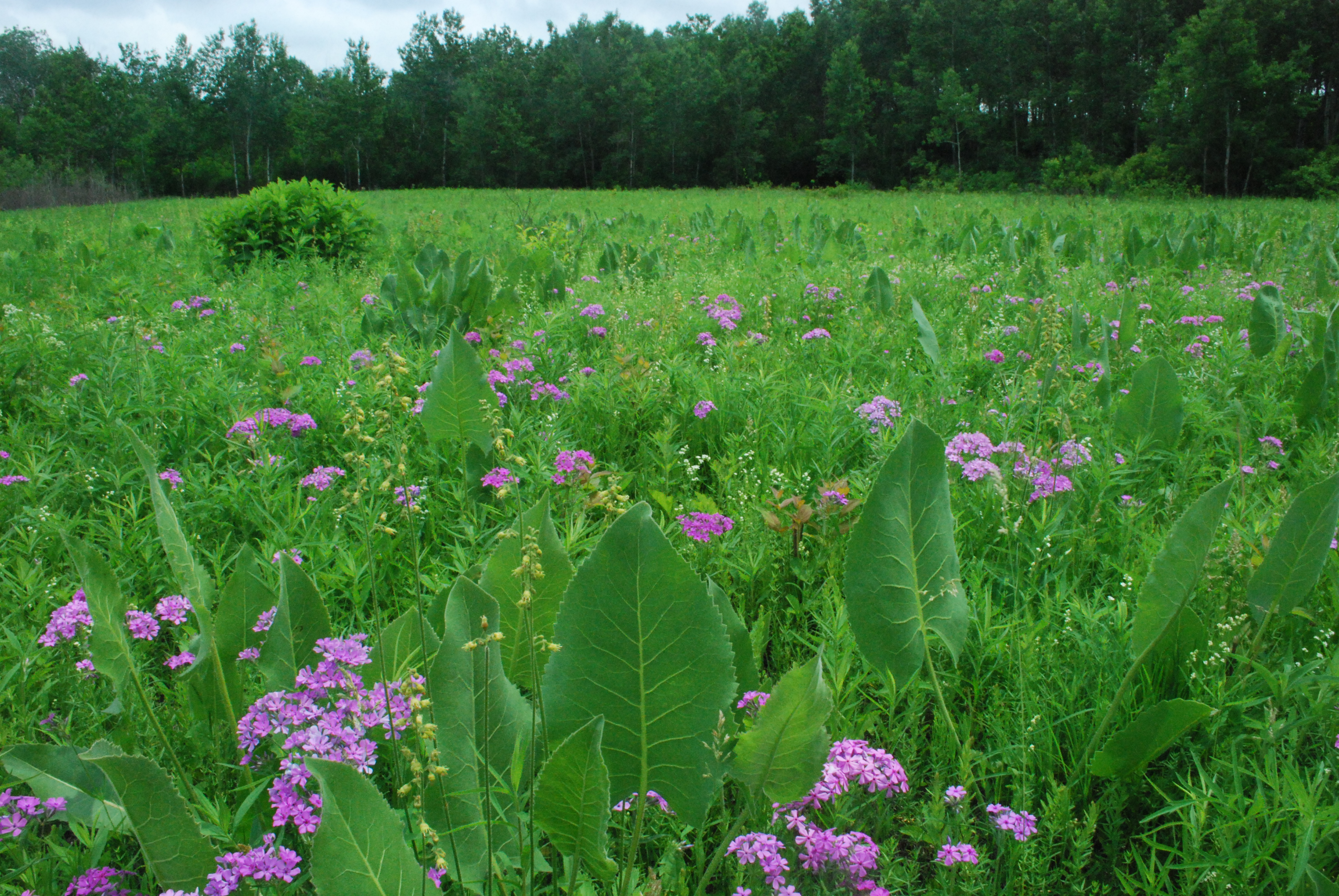
Downy phlox blooming in its natural habitat, in a Wisconsin prairie. (The large-leafed plant is Silphium terebinthinaceum.)

== Ecology ==
The flowers produce pollen on anthers near the end of the corolla tube, and nectar at the bottom of the corolla. Only butterflies, moths, skippers, and very long-tongued bees (the largest bumblebees) have long enough tongues to reach the nectar. Shorter-tongued bees and flower flies visit to feed on or gather pollen. It is a larval host to the phlox moth (Schinia indiana).

The flowers are self-incompatible. Unless they are cross-pollinated, they will not produce any seed. Butterflies, skippers, and moths are the most effective pollinators. As they insert their proboscis into the corolla tube, it touches the anthers and picks up pollen. When they roll up their proboscis and move to the next flower, some pollen remains and is transferred to the stigma as they insert their proboscis into the next flower.
