= Tall goldenrod =

Tall goldenrod is a common name for several species of plants and may refer to:

- Solidago altissima
- Solidago canadensis
- Solidago gigantea
