= Weston, McLean County, Illinois =

Weston, Illinois
- Unincorporated community
- Location of Weston within Illinois Weston (the United States)
- Coordinates: 40°44′50″N 88°37′19″W
- Country: United States
- State: Illinois
- County: McLean
- Elevation: 702 ft (214 m)
- Time zone: UTC-6 (CST)
  - Summer (DST): UTC-5 (CDT)
- ZIP code: 61726
- Area codes: 815, 779
- GNIS ID: 420966

Weston is an unincorporated community located in McLean County, Illinois. It currently is still in existence, as opposed to its now-defunct namesake in DuPage County.

== History ==
Weston was laid out 26 August 1867 by W. F. Bryan. The Original Town included 288 small lots, five blocks that were not subdivided and a Public Park. The depot and town hall were on the south side of the tracks. It was a station along the Toledo Peoria and Western Railroad. In 1895 there were four churches. Just east of town an area of natural tall grass prairie survives at Weston Cemetery Prairie.
