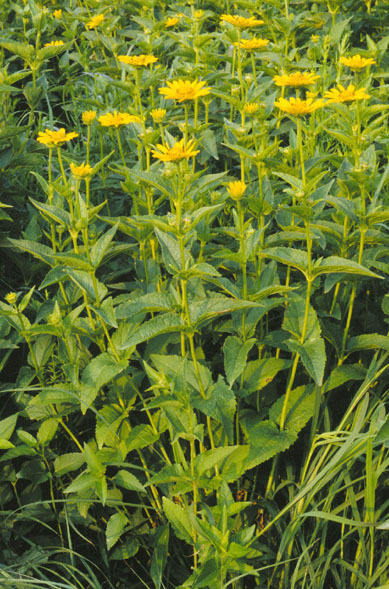
- Heliopsis helianthoides

Scientific classification
- Kingdom: Plantae
- Clade: Tracheophytes
- Clade: Angiosperms
- Clade: Eudicots
- Clade: Asterids
- Order: Asterales
- Family: Asteraceae
- Subfamily: Asteroideae
- Tribe: Heliantheae
- Subtribe: Zinniinae
- Genus: Heliopsis; Pers. 1807

Synonyms
- Kallias (Cass.) Cass.; Helenomoium Willd. ex DC.; Heliopsis subg. Kallias Cass.; Helepta Raf.; Andrieuxia DC.

= Heliopsis =

Genus of flowering plants

Heliopsis is a genus of herbaceous flowering plants in the family Asteraceae, native to dry prairies in North and South America. The sunflower-like composite flowerheads are usually yellow, up to 8 cm (3 in) in diameter, and are borne in summer. Species are commonly called ox-eye or oxeye.

The name Heliopsis (pronounced /ˌhiːliˈɒpsɪs/, from Greek helios for "sun" and opsis for "appearance") refers to the bright yellow color of the flowers.

Species are found widely in cultivation in temperate climates, notably varieties of H. helianthoides.

== Species ==
There are about 18 species, including:

- Heliopsis annua – Zacatecas, Oaxaca, Coahuila, Michoacán, Querétaro, Guanajuato, Nuevo León, Puebla, México State, Hidalgo, San Luis Potosí
- Heliopsis anomala – Baja California Sur
- Heliopsis buphthalmoides (synonym Heliopsis canescens) – Chiapas, Oaxaca, Panama, Honduras, Costa Rica, Guatemala, Colombia, Ecuador, Venezuela, Peru, Bolivia
- Heliopsis decumbens – Peru
- Heliopsis filifolia – Coahuila
- Heliopsis gracilis – smooth oxeye, pinewoods oxeye – southeastern and south-central United States
- Heliopsis helianthoides – smooth oxeye, false sunflower, oxeye, rough oxeye – most of eastern and central USA and Canada
- Heliopsis lanceolata – Colombia
- Heliopsis longipes – gold root – San Luis Potosí
- Heliopsis novogaliciana – Jalisco, Durango, Sinaloa
- Heliopsis parviceps – Guerrero
- Heliopsis parvifolia – mountain oxeye – northern Mexico, southwestern United States
- Heliopsis procumbens – Durango, Jalisco, Mexico State, Distrito Federal, Sinaloa
- Heliopsis sinaloensis – Sinaloa
- Heliopsis suffruticosa – Zacatecas
