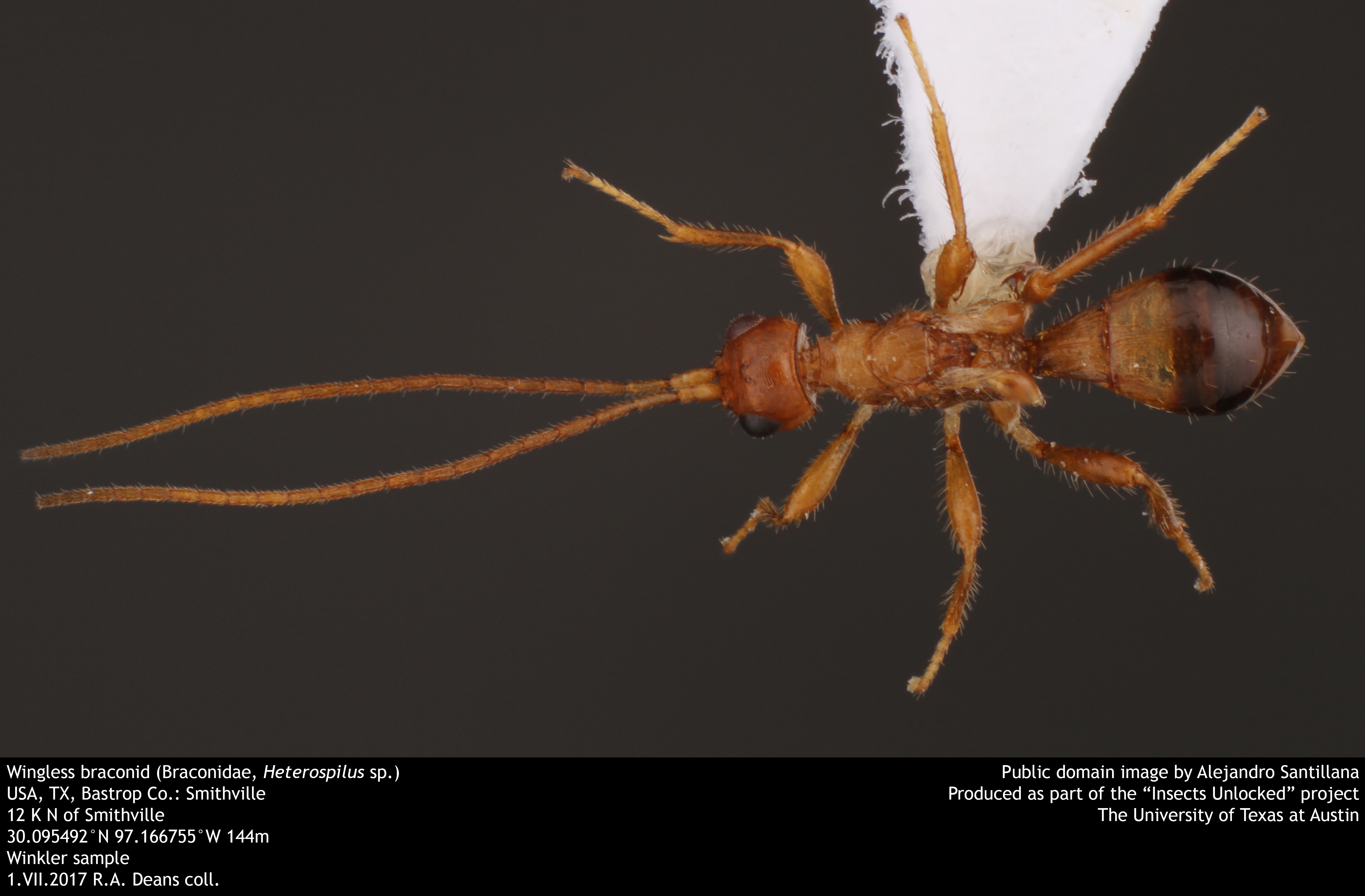

Scientific classification
- Kingdom: Animalia
- Phylum: Arthropoda
- Class: Insecta
- Order: Hymenoptera
- Family: Braconidae
- Subfamily: Doryctinae
- Genus: Heterospilus; Haliday, 1836

= Heterospilus =

Genus of wasps

Heterospilus is a genus of wasp in the family Braconidae. There are at least 130 described species in Heterospilus.

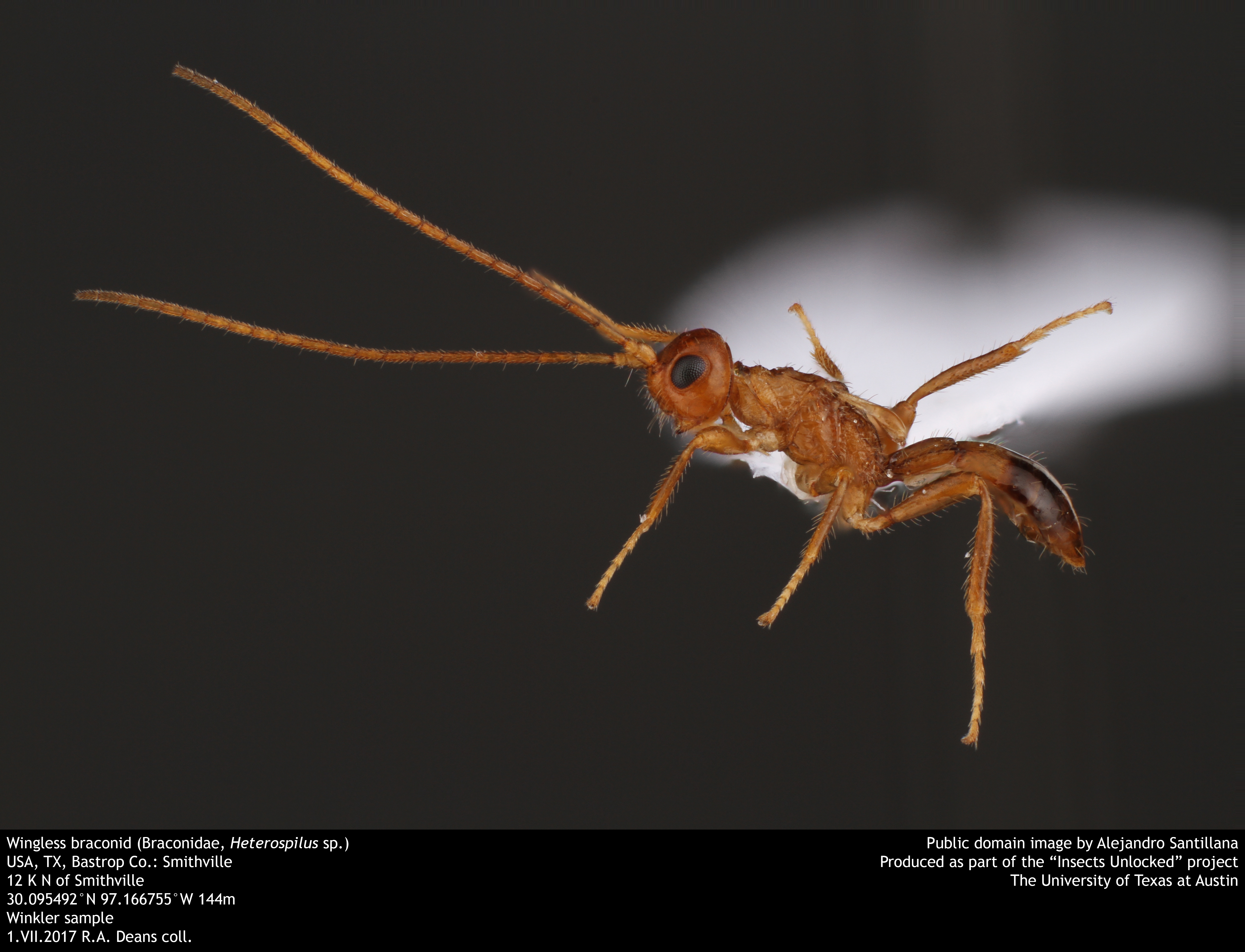

== See also ==
- List of Heterospilus species
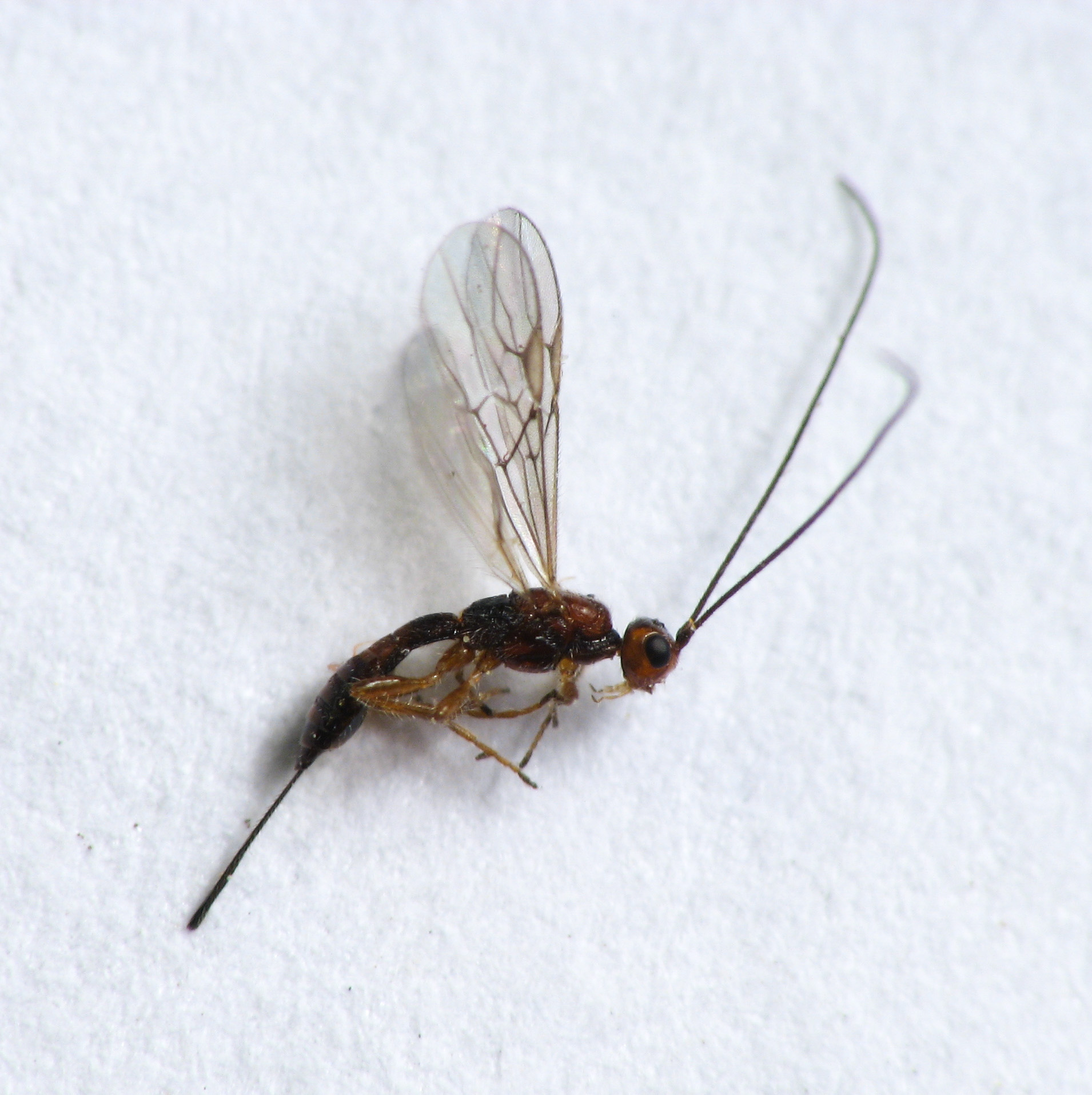
Heterospilus eurostae female

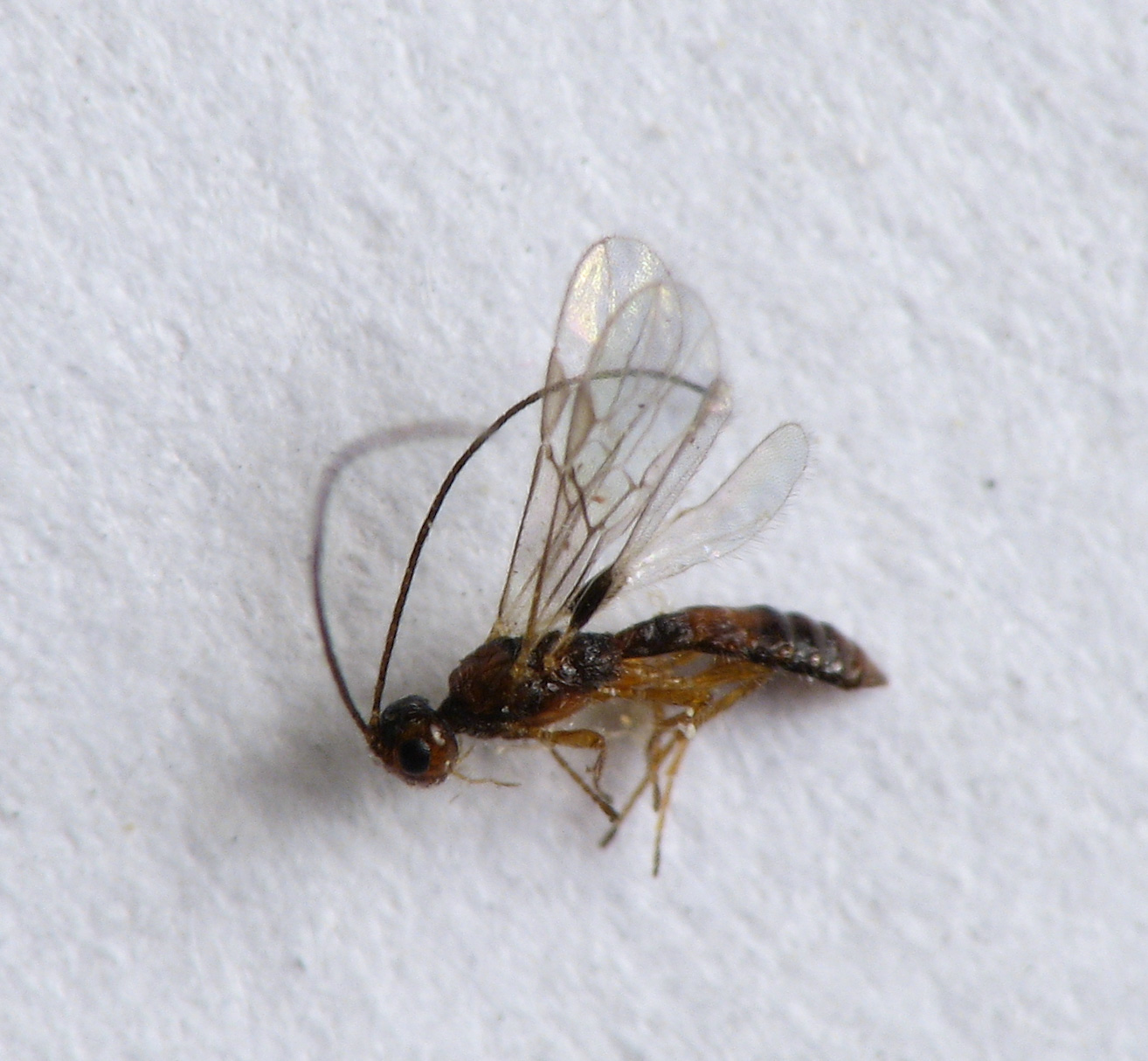
Heterospilus eurostae male
