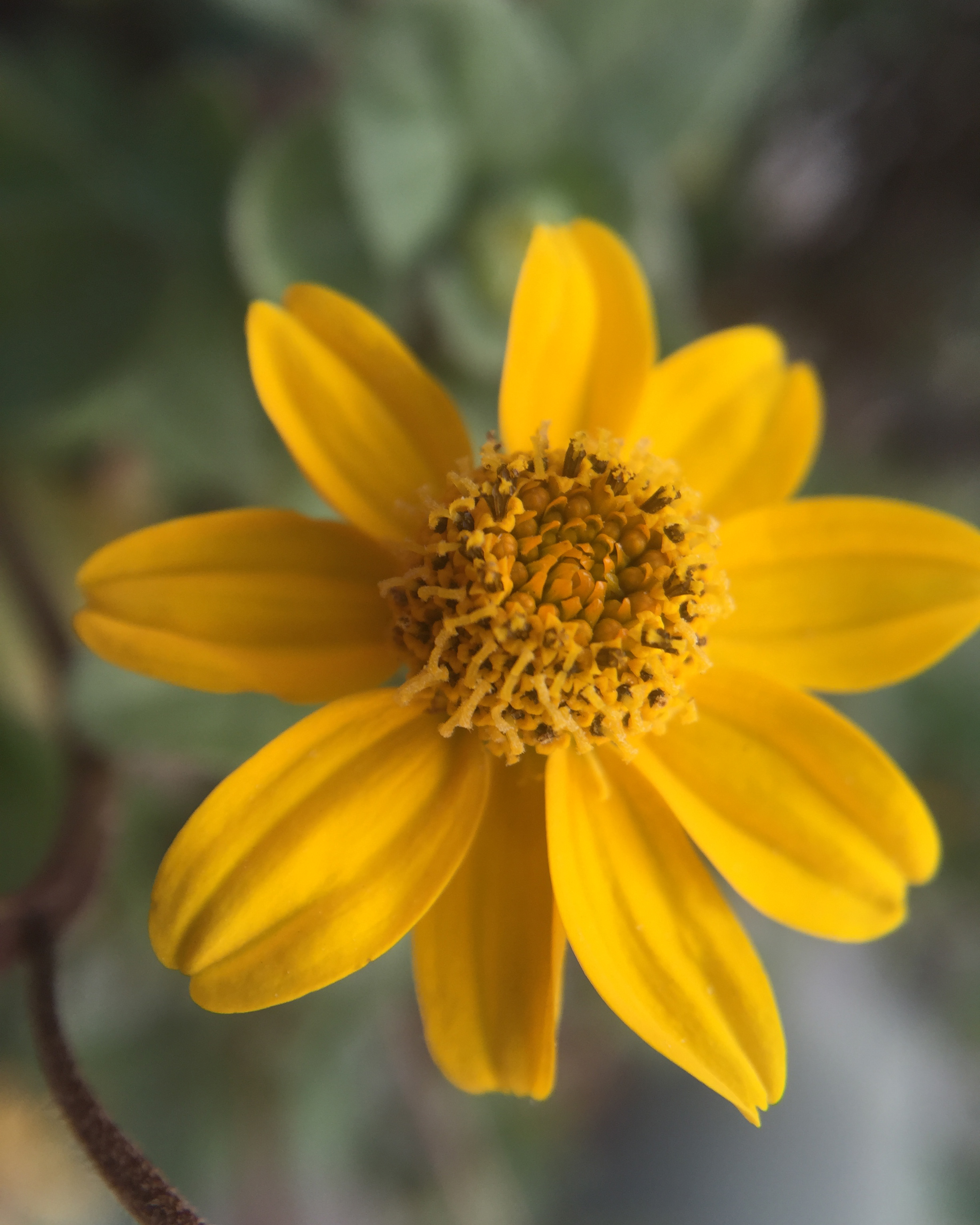

Scientific classification
- Kingdom: Plantae
- Clade: Tracheophytes
- Clade: Angiosperms
- Clade: Eudicots
- Clade: Asterids
- Order: Asterales
- Family: Asteraceae
- Tribe: Heliantheae
- Genus: Heliopsis
- Species: H. longipes

Binomial name
- Heliopsis longipes (A.Gray) S.F.Blake 1924

Synonyms
- Philactis longipes A.Gray

= Heliopsis longipes =

Species of flowering plant

Heliopsis longipes is a rare species of flowering plant in the family Asteraceae. It has been found only in the states of Guanajuato, San Luis Potosí, Hidalgo, and Querétaro in north-central Mexico.

Locally called chilcuague, Azteca gold root, and many other names, it was considered powerful medicine for the prehispanic populations of México.

== Use and healing properties ==
The root is chewed to numb the tongue and relieve pain in the teeth and throat. It has antibiotic properties (so it is traditionally used against throat infection, pharyngitis, tonsillitis, laryngitis, esophagitis, gingivitis and other infections even on the skin), it is also recognized as a powerful antifungal (traditionally used against athlete's foot, onychomycosis, dandruff and candidiasis or milkweed), is analgesic, antiseptic, anesthetic it is traditionally used in the painful dentition presented by babies helping to immediately eliminate the discomfort caused by the appearance of the first teeth).

It is also used as a condiment in foods and alcoholic beverages. It has depurative properties. Upon ingestion, it produces abundant secretions of bodily fluids such as saliva, sweat and urine due to its influence on the maxillary gland, which is why it was used by Chichimecas both as a condiment and as a natural medicine.

The word chilcuague has its origin in the Nahuatl because this plant was recognized as Chilcoatl (chil for spicy and coatl for the shape of its root that looks like a snake), in the markets it is also known with the following names: herb grindstone, chil cuas, chilcuan, chilcmecatl, Aztec root, gold root, chili de palo, palo de duende, among others. When chewing it has a sialogogous effect (stimulating the production of saliva), which in turn has several effects on the organism, among them those produced by the digestive enzymes present in saliva (amylase and lipase), buffering and neutralizing the pH of the stomach and the oral cavity, instantaneously controlling reflux, acidity and gastritis, and promoting the secretion of endorphins.
