= Heliopsis buphthalmoides =

Scientific classification
- Kingdom: Plantae
- Clade: Tracheophytes
- Clade: Angiosperms
- Clade: Eudicots
- Clade: Asterids
- Order: Asterales
- Family: Asteraceae
- Tribe: Heliantheae
- Genus: Heliopsis
- Species: H. buphthalmoides

Binomial name
- Heliopsis buphthalmoides (Jacq.) Dunal 1819 not Brandegee 1889

Synonyms
- Synonymy: Acmella buphthalmoides (Jacq.) Rich.; Acmella buphthalmoides Pers.; Andrieuxia mexicana DC.; Anthemis buphthalmoides Jacq. 1797; Anthemis oppositifolia Lam.; Anthemis ovalifolia Ortega; Heliopsis dubia Dunal; Heliopsis oppositifolia (Lam.) S.Díaz; Heliopsis pulchra T.R.Fisher; Kallias ovata Cass.; Spilanthes oppositifolia (Lam.) D'Arcy; Verbesina ovata Hort. ex Poir.

Species of flowering plant

Heliopsis buphthalmoides is a New World species of flowering plant in the family Asteraceae. It is the only member of its genus native to both North America and South America. It is found in Mexico (from Durango and Sinaloa south to Chiapas), all 7 countries of Central America, and western South America (Colombia, Venezuela, Perú, and Bolivia).
