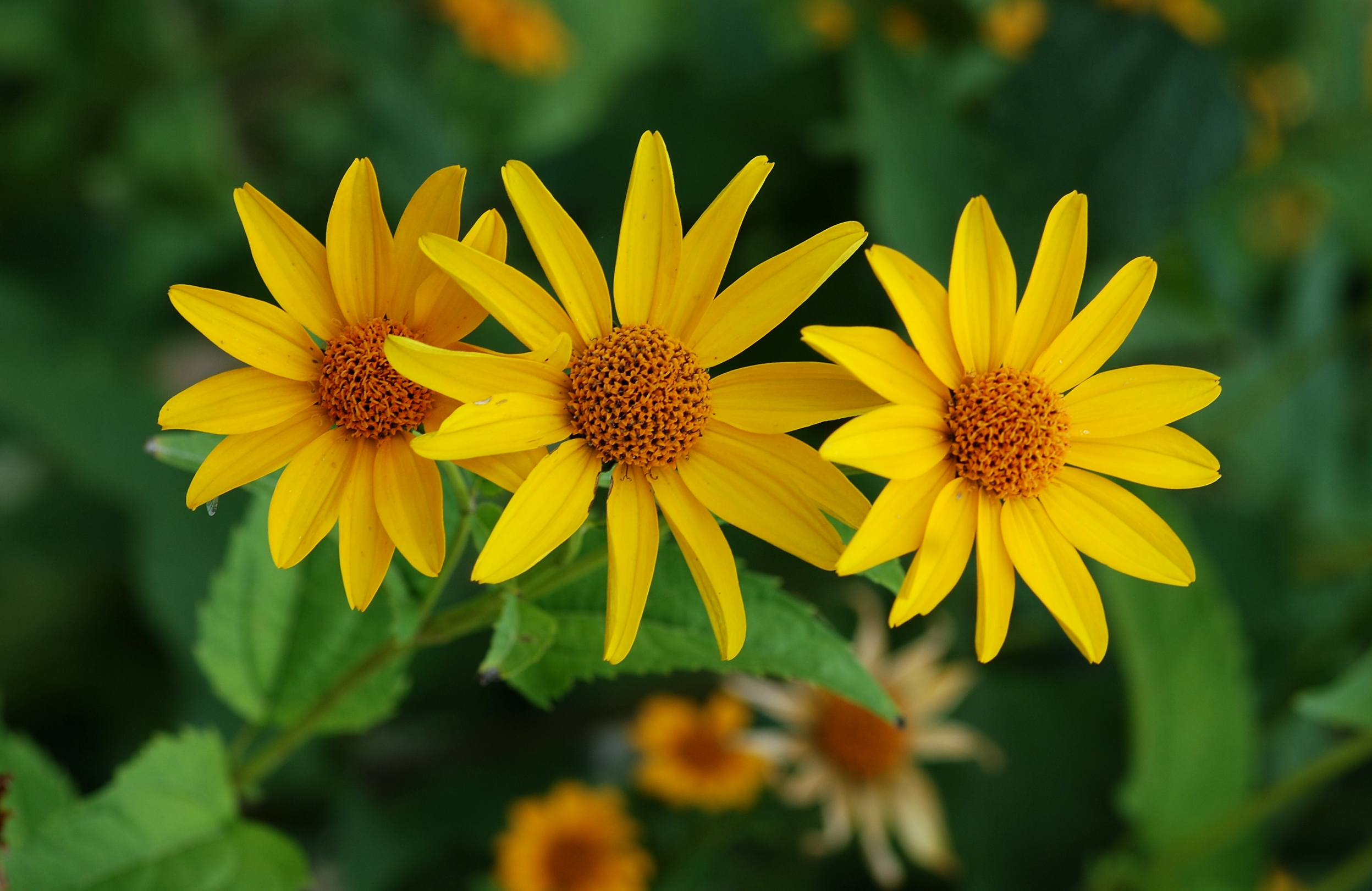

Conservation status
- Secure (NatureServe)

Scientific classification
- Kingdom: Plantae
- Clade: Embryophytes
- Clade: Tracheophytes
- Clade: Spermatophytes
- Clade: Angiosperms
- Clade: Eudicots
- Clade: Asterids
- Order: Asterales
- Family: Asteraceae
- Tribe: Heliantheae
- Genus: Heliopsis
- Species: H. helianthoides

Binomial name
- Heliopsis helianthoides (L.) Sweet

Synonyms
- Synonymy: Buphthalmum helianthoides L. 1753; Acmella flavicaulis Raf.; Acmella nudicaulis Raf.; Acmella parvifolia Raf.; Heliopsis oppositifolia (L.) Druce; Rudbeckia oppositifolia L.; Silphium solidaginoides L.; Buphthalmum melissoides Poir.; Heliopsis minor (Hook.) C.Mohr; Heliopsis scabra

= Heliopsis helianthoides =

Species of flowering plant

Heliopsis helianthoides is a species of flowering plant in the family Asteraceae, known by the common names rough oxeye, smooth oxeye and false sunflower. It is native to eastern and central North America from Saskatchewan east to Newfoundland and south as far as Texas, New Mexico, and Georgia.

Heliopsis helianthoides is a rhizomatous herbaceous perennial growing 40–150 cm (16–59 in) tall. The toothed leaf blades are oval to triangular or lance-shaped and may be smooth or hairy or rough in texture. The flowers are produced from midsummer to early autumn (fall). The inflorescence contains one to many composite flowerheads. Each head contains yellow ray florets which are generally 2–4 cm (3/4–1 1/2 in) long. The rays are fertile, having a small forked pistil at the base; this distinguishes them from true sunflowers. At the center are many yellow to brownish disc florets. The fruit is an achene about 5 mm (0.20 in) long.

In the wild, H. helianthoides may be found in wooded areas and tallgrass prairie, and sometimes along roadsides.

It is a popular garden plant for moist, fertile soil in full sun. Plants grow stiff and tall, so may require staking. Several cultivars are available with flowers of varying colors and shades. These include "Summer Sun", "Golden Plume", and "Prairie Sunset". The "Benzinggold", "Goldgefieder", "Light of Loddon", and "Spitzentänzerin" cultivars of H. helianthoides var. scabra ("rough") have gained the Royal Horticultural Society's Award of Garden Merit.

The Botanical Latin species name helianthoides means "resembling sunflowers".

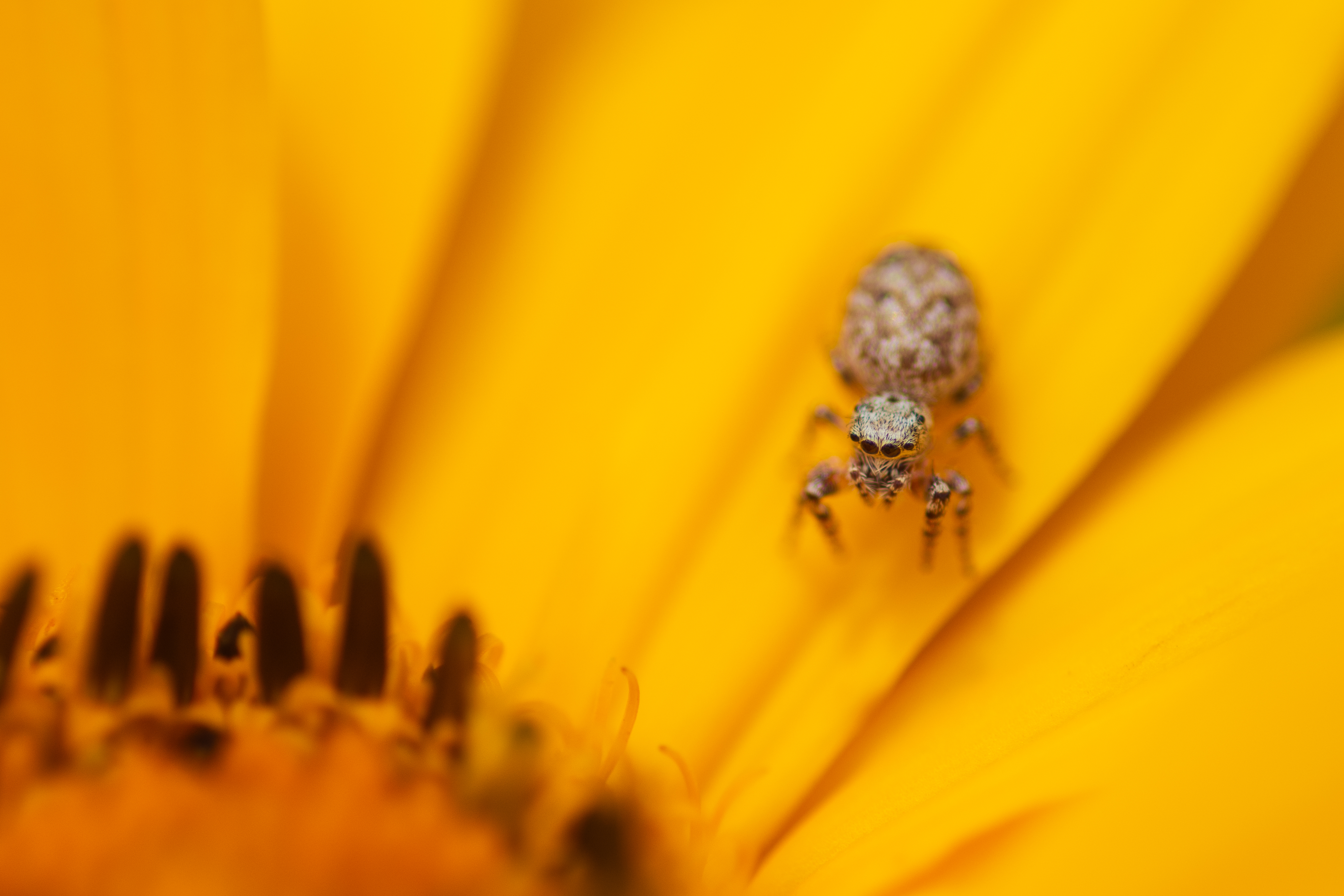
False sunflower attracts a range of predatory arthropods including jumping spiders, which use the open flower heads as hunting platforms for visiting pollinators.
