= List of nature centers in Illinois =

This is a list of nature centers in the U.S. state of Illinois.

== Nature centers ==
| Name | Location | County | Region | Summary |
|---|---|---|---|---|
| Adams Wildlife Sanctuary | Springfield | Sangamon | Central | 40 acres, operated by the Illinois Audubon Society |
| Andresen Nature Center | Fulton | Whiteside | Northwest | information, operated by volunteers, open for city events and education programs, features displays of local wildlife, insects, and flora found along the local watershed of the upper Mississippi River |
| Anita Purves Nature Center | Urbana | Champaign | Central | website, operated by Urbana Park District, exhibits on the natural history of Illinois, interactive and hands-on displays, live animals, located in Crystal Lake Park, adjacent to Busey Woods, a 59-acre forest preserve |
| Army Trail Nature Center | Addison | DuPage | Chicago area | website, 17 acres, outdoor classroom, partnership of the Addison Park District, Addison Elementary School District 4 & DuPage High School District 88 |
| Ballard Nature Center | Altamont | Effingham | Central | website, 210 acre nature preserve and educational center. It includes 107 acres of woodland, 15 acres of restored prairie, 10 acres of shallow water wetlands and 85 acres of agricultural land. |
| Barkhausen Cache River Wetlands Center | Cypress | Johnson | Southern | Exhibits about natural history of the Cache River Wetlands and Cypress Creek National Wildlife Refuge, managed by the Illinois Department of Natural Resources |
| Bartlett Nature Center | Bartlett | DuPage | Chicago area | Located in the James "Pate" Philip State Park, operated by the Bartlett Park District |
| Black Hawk State Historic Site | Rock Island | Rock Island | Northern | 208-acre park includes Singing Bird Nature Center for outdoor education programs and native bird section, and a museum of Native American life |
| Cabin Nature Center | Wood Dale | DuPage | Chicago area | website, operated by the Wood Dale Park District |
| Creek Bend Nature Center | St. Charles | Kane | Chicago area | website, operated by the Forest Preserve District of Kane County in 439-acre LeRoy Oakes Forest Preserve, interpretive displays including prairie ecology and Fox River |
| Crabtree Nature Center | Barrington | Cook | Chicago area | website, operated by the Forest Preserve District of Cook County, over 1,000 acres, features outdoor nature play area |
| Crystal Lake Nature Center | Crystal Lake | McHenry | Northern | website, operated by the Crystal Lake Park District in 130-acre Veterans Acres Park, seasonal butterfly house |
| Douglas-Hart Nature Center | Mattoon | Coles | Central | 70 acre preserve with prairie, woodlands and wetlands habitat, 2 miles of trails, interactive displays of local wild life, live reptiles and amphibians, a bird observation area, children's discovery den, library |
| Eden Place Nature Center | Chicago | Cook | Chicago area | website, 3-acre urban nature preserve with a focus on food production and environmental education |
| Emily Oaks Nature Center | Skokie | Cook | Chicago area | website, 13 acres, operated by the Skokie Park District |
| Forest Park Nature Center | Peoria | Peoria | Central | website, operated by the Peoria Park District, 540 acre preserve, 7 miles of trails, natural history museum and bird observation room, musical and educational programs |
| Four Rivers Environmental Education Center | Channahon | Will | Chicago area | website, operated by the Forest Preserve District of Will County in 525-acre McKinley Woods - Kerry Sheridan Grove |
| Fullersburg Woods Nature Education Center | Oak Brook | DuPage | Chicago area | Operated by the Forest Preserve District of DuPage County, 226 acres, exhibits on area natural history |
| The Grove | Glenview | Cook | Chicago area | Operated by the Glenview Park District, 123 acres, natural and cultural history displays, 1856 period house, log cabin, Native American longhouse, replica one-room schoolhouse, wetland greenhouse |
| Hawthorne Hill Nature Center | Elgin | Kane | Chicago area | website, 67 acres, operated by the City |
| Heller Nature Center | Highland Park | Lake | Chicago area | website, operated by the City, 97 acre preserve with 3 miles of trails |
| Hidden Oaks Nature Center | Bolingbrook | Will | Chicago area | website, operated by the Bolingbrook Park District, almost 80 acres, hands-on discovery center, nature playground, outdoor amphitheater, Seedlings Nature Preschool |
| Kent Fuller Air Station Prairie/Tyner Center | Glenview | Cook | Chicago area | website, operated by the Glenview Park District, 32-acre remnant of a tall-grass prairie, seasonal educational programs about the prairie, the environment and "green" programs |
| Kildeer Nature Center | Kildeer | Lake | Chicago area | website, 5 acres of open space, operated by the Village |
| Ladd Arboretum & Evanston Ecology Center | Evanston | Cook | Chicago area | 23 acre arboretum and nature education facility |
| Lake Katherine Nature Center and Botanic Gardens | Palos Heights | Cook | Chicago area | website, operated by the City, 85-acre park, 20-acre man-made lake with gardens, woodlands, and prairie |
| Lake Renwick Preserve | Plainfield | Will | Chicago area | Operated by the Forest Preserve District of Will County, 320 acre site and 200 acre lake where great blue herons, great egrets, black-crowned night herons, double-crested cormorants, and cattle egrets nest together, features Lake Renwick Heron Rookery Visitor Center with birding programs |
| Lakeview Nature Center | Macomb | McDonough | Central | website, operated by the City, adjacent to Spring Lake Park, 55 acres of prairie, interactive displays and hands on programs that emphasize exploration and investigation of the environment |
| Laws of Nature Center | Yorkville | Kendall | Chicago area | operated by the Kendall County Forest Preserve District, exhibits about prairies, insects, Native Americans, live bees, snakes, salamanders and frogs |
| Lincoln Memorial Garden and Nature Center | Springfield | Sangamon | Central | 100-acre (0.4 km^{2}) woodland and prairie garden owned by the city of Springfield and managed by the Abraham Lincoln Memorial Garden Foundation |
| Little Red Schoolhouse Nature Center | Willow Springs | Cook | Chicago area | website, operated by the Forest Preserve District of Cook County, interactive exhibits, live animals |
| Lockhart Family Nature Center | Lake Forest | Lake | Chicago area | website, operated by Lake Forest Open Lands, located on 50-acre Mellody Farm Nature Preserve with the adjacent 514-acre Middlefork Savanna Forest Preserve |
| Lost Valley Visitor Center | Crystal Lake | McHenry | Northern | website, operated by the McHenry County Conservation District in 3,200-acre Glacial Park |
| Lyman Woods Nature Center | Downers Grove | DuPage | Chicago area | website, operated by the village, 150 acres of oak woods, prairie, and marsh habitat, William F. Sherman, Jr. Interpretive Center features changing exhibits and activities, native landscaping, butterfly and rain gardens |
| Morton Arboretum | Lisle | DuPage | Chicago area | 1,700 acres, offers extensive nature-entered education programs |
| Natural Resources Education Center at Russell Preserve | Genoa | DeKalb | Chicago area | website, operated by the DeKalb County Forest Preserve for environmental education programs |
| North Park Village Nature Center | Chicago | Cook | Chicago area | website, forty-six acre nature preserve and an educational facility, operated by City |
| Peck Farm Park | Geneva | Kane | Chicago area | website, operated by the City, 385 acre park featuring a visitor center with hands-on nature and history displays, observation silo, trails, sports facilities, outdoor education center |
| Pilcher Park Nature Center | Joliet | Will | Chicago area | website, operated by the City, over 640 acres |
| Plum Creek Nature Center | Beecher | Will | Chicago area | Operated by the Forest Preserve District of Will County in 891-acre Goodenow Grove Nature Preserve, natural playscape featuring a pollinator garden, rain garden, and interactive play elements |
| Prairie Grass Nature Museum | Round Lake | Lake | Chicago area | website, operated by the village, features realistic habitats, live animals, nature activities and programs |
| Red Oak Nature Center | North Aurora | Kane | Chicago area | website, operated by the Fox Valley Park District, 40+ acres, hands-on displays, live animals, nature preschool, cave |
| River Trail Nature Center | Northbrook | Cook | Chicago area | website, operated by the Forest Preserve District of Cook County, live animals, nature programs |
| Rivershire Park and Nature Center | Lincolnshire | Lake | Chicago area | operated by the village, 15 acres, outdoor education programs |
| Robert Allerton Park | Willow Branch | Piatt | Central | 1,517-acre (614 ha) park, nature center and conference center |
| Rock Springs Conservation Area & Nature Center | Decatur | Macon | Central | 1,300 acres, operated by the Macon County Conservation District, includes nature center museum, restored farmhouse, about nine miles of hiking trails, and a paved bike trail |
| Ruth Edwards Nature Center | Dixon | Lee | Northwestern | Operated by the Dixon Park District, Great horned owl on display, education, nature preserve, trails on 200 acres of woodland and meadows, disc golf course, outdoor shelters available, playgrounds including a zip line, boat launch available on the Rock River |
| Sagawau Environmental Learning Center | Lemont | Cook | Chicago area | website, operated by the Forest Preserve District of Cook County, exhibits on geology, history, and habitat management |
| Sand Ridge Nature Center | South Holland | Cook | Chicago area | website, operated by the Forest Preserve District of Cook County, 235 acres, exhibits on the natural and cultural history of the Calumet region, native animals, reproduction early 19th century log cabins |
| Severson Dells Nature Center | Rockford | Winnebago | Northern | website, operated by the County, 369-acre county forest preserve |
| Springbrook Nature Center | Itasca | DuPage | Chicago area | website, operated by the village, 2 miles of trails, aquarium, butterfly garden |
| Stillman Nature Center | South Barrington | Cook | Chicago area | website, private, non-profit center for environmental education located on 80 acres of woods, lake and prairie, live birds of prey |
| Stronghold Camp & Retreat Center | Oregon | Ogle | Chicago area | website, 360 acres, outdoor classroom, can host up to 180 people. |
| Sugar Grove Nature Center | Funk's Grove | McLean | Central | Located within the 18-acre Funk's Grove Nature Preserve, interpretive environmental exhibits, sensory displays, live animals and a wildlife viewing area |
| Thorn Creek Nature Center and Preserve | Park Forest | Will | Chicago area | Operated by the Forest Preserve District of Will County, 985 acres, over 3 miles of trails |
| Trailside Museum of Natural History | River Forest | Cook | Chicago area | website, operated by the Forest Preserve District of Cook County, displays of live native animals, wildflower gardens, information about local wildlife and their habitats |
| Vera Meineke Nature Center at Spring Valley | Schaumburg | Cook | Chicago area | website, operated by City, 135 acres, earth-sheltered, passive-solar visitor center, includes hands-on exhibits, discovery niches and a natural history library, park includes Volkening Heritage Farm, an 1880s living history farm |
| Volo Bog State Natural Area | Ingleside | Lake | Chicago area | Over 1100 acres including a 45-acre bog, visitor center with exhibits, bog tours, prairie walks, insect and aqua safari's, summer bat programs and more |
| Watershed Nature Center | Edwardsville | Madison | Metro East | website, owned by the City of Edwardsville, managed by the Nature Preserve Foundation, Inc., over 40 acres, 1 mile trail, restored prairie, wetlands and woods |
| Wildlife Discovery Center | Lake Forest | Lake | Chicago area | website, operated by the City, located at 670-acre Elawa Farm, includes nature center, live animals, wildlife sanctuary, museum, and biological station |
| Wildwood Nature Center | Park Ridge | Cook | Chicago area | website, operated by Park Ridge Park District, 5 acres, live animals, nature exhibits |
| Willowbrook Wildlife Center | Glen Ellyn | DuPage | Chicago area | Operated by the Forest Preserve District of DuPage County, native wildlife rehabilitation facility with rehabilitated animals on display, education, trails |

== See also ==
- List of nature centers in the United States
