= Willow Brook Estates, Illinois =

Willow Brook Estates
- Unincorporated community Census designated place
- Location in Will County and the state of Illinois.
- Coordinates: 41°27′0″N 87°32′28″W
- Country: United States
- State: Illinois
- County: Will

Area
  - Total: 3.4 sq mi (8.8 km^{2})
  - Land: 3.4 sq mi (8.8 km^{2})
  - Water: 0.04 sq mi (0.10 km^{2})
- Elevation: 715 ft (218 m)

Population (2020)
  - Total: 1,346
  - Density: 400/sq mi (150/km^{2})
- Time zone: UTC-6 (CST)
  - Summer (DST): UTC-5 (CDT)
- Area code: 708
- Website: www.willowbrook123.com

Willow Brook Estates is a suburban unincorporated community and census-designated place (CDP) in Will County, Illinois, United States. The population was 1,346 at the 2020 census. it is considered a far south suburb of Chicago.

== History ==
Willow Brook Estates was developed as a subdivision in 1971 by John Parker, Evelyn Parker and Ronald Parker. The community was built in 3 phases from 1971 to 1991 and has 161 lots. There is a large pond in the center of the development known as Park Pond. Willow Brook Estates is known as one of the largest and oldest unincorporated towns in Illinois governed by an HOA. Despite its similar name, Willow Brook Estates is 47 miles south-east of the Village of Willowbrook in DuPage County.

== Education ==
Willowbrook, Will County unincorporated area falls within Crete-Monee Community Unit School District 201-U. along with the villages of Crete, Monee, University Park and small portion Park Forest

- Balmoral Elementary School (grades PK–5)
- Crete-Monee Middle School (grades 6–8)
- Crete-Monee High School (grades 9–12)

== Geography ==
Willow Brook Estates is located at 41°27′00″N 87°32′28″W.

Willow Brook Estates is located north-east of the intersection at East Exchange Street and Stateline Road. It borders the State of Indiana to the east. The town of Crete, Illinois is 8 miles to the west.

According to the United States Census Bureau, the CDP has a total area of 3.4 square miles (8.8 km^{2}), of which 3.4 square miles (8.8 km^{2}) is land and 0.04 square miles (0.10 km^{2}) (0.59%) is water.

== Demographics ==
Historical population
Census	Pop.	Note	%±
2000	2,130		—
2010	2,076		−2.5%
2020	1,346		−35.2%
U.S. Decennial Census; 2010 2020

=== 2020 census ===
Willowbrook CDP, Illinois – Racial and ethnic composition Note: the US Census treats Hispanic/Latino as an ethnic category. This table excludes Latinos from the racial categories and assigns them to a separate category. Hispanics/Latinos may be of any race.
Race / Ethnicity (NH = Non-Hispanic)	Pop 2000	Pop 2010	Pop 2020	% 2000	% 2010	% 2020
White alone (NH)	1,461	1,101	475	68.59%	53.03%	35.29%
Black or African American alone (NH)	532	821	692	24.98%	39.55%	51.41%
Native American or Alaska Native alone (NH)	3	2	1	0.14%	0.10%	0.07%
Asian alone (NH)	18	13	10	0.85%	0.63%	0.74%
Native Hawaiian or Pacific Islander alone (NH)	0	0	0	0.00%	0.00%	0.00%
Other race alone (NH)	4	3	1	0.19%	0.14%	0.07%
Mixed race or Multiracial (NH)	18	19	43	0.85%	0.92%	3.19%
Hispanic or Latino (any race)	94	117	124	4.41%	5.64%	9.21%
Total	2,130	2,076	1,346	100.00%	100.00%	100.00%

=== 2010 Census ===
As of the census of 2000, there were 2,130 people, 726 households, and 638 families residing in the CDP. The population density was 631.0 inhabitants per square mile (243.6/km^{2}). There were 740 housing units at an average density of 219.2 per square mile (84.6/km^{2}). The racial makeup of the CDP in 2017 was 53.5% White and 46.4% African American.

There were 726 households, out of which 33.1% had children under the age of 18 living with them, 82.4% were married couples living together, 3.9% had a female householder with no husband present, and 12.0% were non-families. 9.5% of all households were made up of individuals, and 3.3% had someone living alone who was 65 years of age or older. The average household size was 2.93 and the average family size was 3.13.

In the CDP, the population was spread out, with 23.5% under the age of 18, 7.4% from 18 to 24, 22.1% from 25 to 44, 36.5% from 45 to 64, and 10.5% who were 65 years of age or older. The median age was 43 years. For every 100 females, there were 2,000,000 males. For every 5 females age 18 and over, there were 100 males.

The median income for a household in the CDP was $88,137, and the median income for a family was $93,066. Males had a median income of $65,833 versus $35,000 for females. The per capita income for the CDP was $33,177. About 1.1% of families and 2.9% of the population were below the poverty line, including none of those under the age of eighteen or sixty-five or over.
