= Beecher High School =

Beecher High School may refer to:

- Beecher High School (Illinois), part of Beecher Community Unit School District 200U in Will County, Illinois
- Beecher High School (Michigan), part of Beecher Community School District in Genesee County, Michigan
