= Monee Township, Illinois =

Monee Township
- Township
- Location in Will County

- Will County's location in Illinois
- Coordinates: 41°25′28″N 87°43′25″W
- Country: United States
- State: Illinois
- County: Will
- Established: November 6, 1849

Government
  - Supervisor: Donna T. Dettbarn

Area
  - Total: 35.9 sq mi (92.9 km^{2})
  - Land: 35.80 sq mi (92.72 km^{2})
  - Water: 0.069 sq mi (0.18 km^{2}) 0.20%
- Elevation: 774 ft (236 m)

Population (2010)
  - Estimate (2016): 15,490
  - Density: 437.7/sq mi (169.0/km^{2})
- Time zone: UTC-6 (CST)
  - Summer (DST): UTC-5 (CDT)
- ZIP codes: 60417, 60449, 60466, 60484
- Area code: 708
- FIPS code: 17-197-49958
- Website: www.moneetownship.com

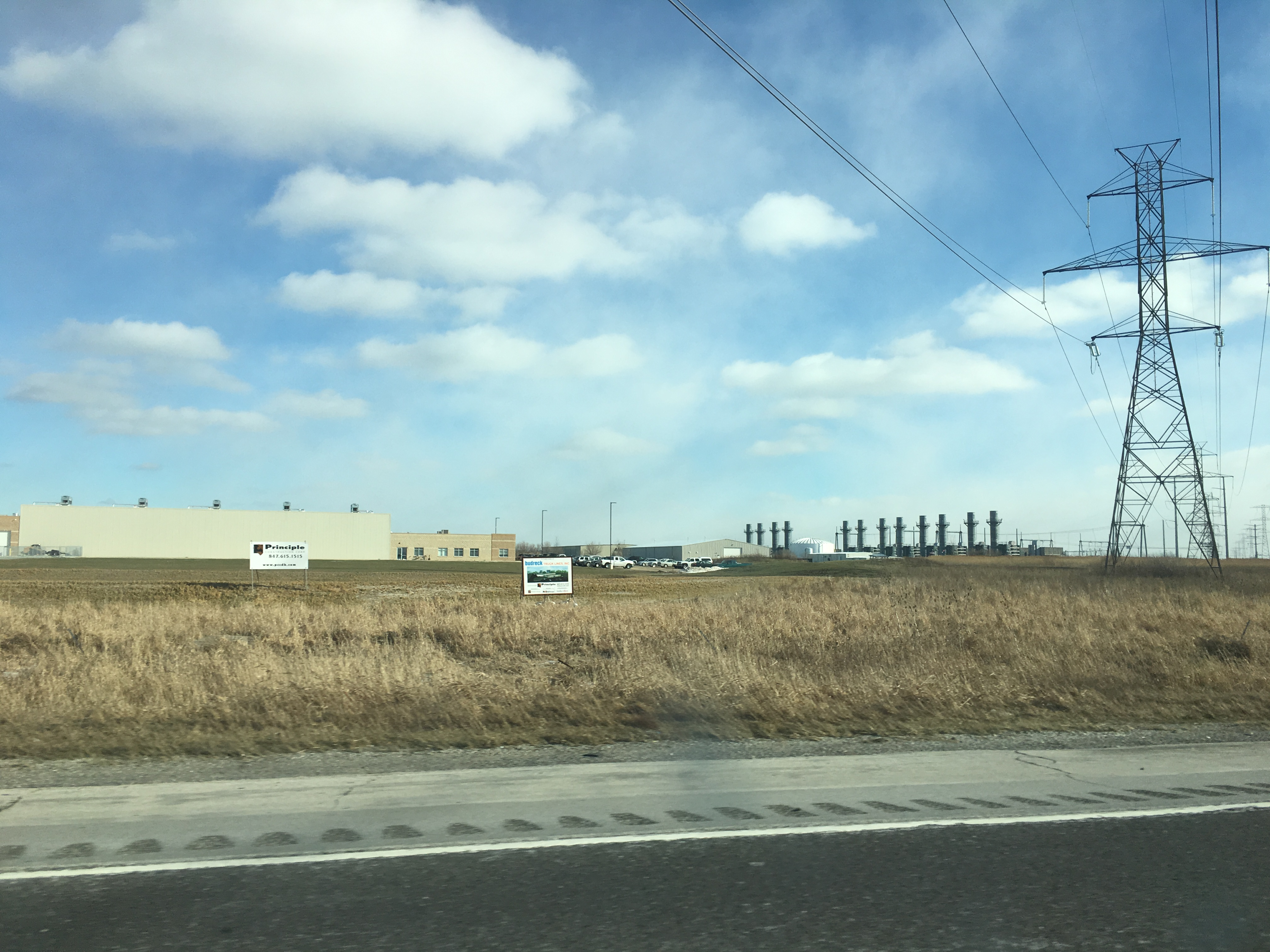
Monee Township

Monee Township is one of 24 townships in Will County, Illinois. As of the 2010 census, its population was 15,669 and it contained 6,182 housing units. Monee Township used to be known as Carcy Township, but the name was changed at an unknown date.

== History ==
=== Raccoon Reservation ===
After the 1832 Treaty of Tippecanoe, daughters of Marie Bailly, an Odawa or Potawatomi woman, were granted 1,280 acres of land in Monee Township surrounding the site of today's Raccoon Grove Nature Preserve. The reservation was purchased by William B. Ogden of Chicago in 1851.

=== Cyclone of 1917 ===
On May 26, 1917, Monee Township was hit by a devastating cyclone. The cyclone, which appeared to have multiple tornadoes, was visible from neighboring Peatone, and left a two to three mile wide path of destruction as it moved from west to east through Will County. Crops were damaged, and at least 50 horses and 100 cattle were killed in Monee and Green Garden townships. The cyclone destroyed multiple homes, wrecked an Illinois Central freight train, drove the water out of Monee Reservoir, and made the road through the wooded picnic grounds at Raccoon Grove impassible. Many trees were downed in the village of Monee, but most structures were spared.

== Geography ==
According to the 2010 census, the township has a total area of 35.87 square miles (92.9 km^{2}), of which 35.8 square miles (93 km^{2}) (or 99.80%) is land and 0.07 square miles (0.18 km^{2}) (or 0.20%) is water. It includes all of Monee, almost all of University Park as well as a small portion of Park Forest.

=== Boundaries ===
Monee Township is bordered by Western Avenue on the east, Steger Road on the north (where Cook County and Will County share a border), Harlem Avenue on the west, and Offner Road on the south.

=== Cities, towns, villages ===
- Monee
- University Park (vast majority)
- Park Forest (small portion)
- Frankfort (small portion)

=== Adjacent townships ===
- Rich Township, Cook County (north)
- Bloom Township, Cook County (northeast)
- Crete Township (east)
- Washington Township (southeast)
- Will Township (south)
- Peotone Township (southwest)
- Green Garden Township (west)
- Frankfort Township (northwest)

=== Cemeteries ===
The township contains the Saint Paul's United Church of Christ Cemetery.

=== Major highways ===
- Illinois Route 50
- Interstate 57

=== Lakes ===
- Pine Lake

=== Landmarks ===
- Raccoon Grove Nature Preserve

== Demographics ==
Monee Township, Illinois – Racial and ethnic composition Note: the US Census treats Hispanic/Latino as an ethnic category. This table excludes Latinos from the racial categories and assigns them to a separate category. Hispanics/Latinos may be of any race.
Race / Ethnicity (NH = Non-Hispanic)	Pop 2000	Pop 2010	Pop 2020	% 2000	% 2010	% 2020
White alone (NH)	6,266	6,167	4,804	47.13%	39.36%	30.90%
Black or African American alone (NH)	6,206	7,946	8,609	46.68%	50.71%	55.37%
Native American or Alaska Native alone (NH)	8	9	31	0.06%	0.06%	0.20%
Asian alone (NH)	78	212	164	0.59%	1.35%	1.05%
Native Hawaiian or Pacific Islander alone (NH)	1	4	4	0.01%	0.03%	0.03%
Other race alone (NH)	38	17	79	0.29%	0.11%	0.51%
Mixed race or Multiracial (NH)	274	294	576	2.06%	1.88%	3.70%
Hispanic or Latino (any race)	423	1,020	1,282	3.18%	6.51%	8.24%
Total	13,294	15,669	15,549	100.00%	100.00%	100.00%

Historical population
Census	Pop.	Note	%±
2016 (est.)	15,490
U.S. Decennial Census

== Political districts ==
- Illinois's 2nd congressional district
- State House District 29
- State House District 80
- State Senate District 15
- State Senate District 40
