= Douglas-Hart Nature Center =

Nature reserve in Illinois, United States

Coordinates: 39.495°N 88.310°W

Douglas–Hart Nature Center
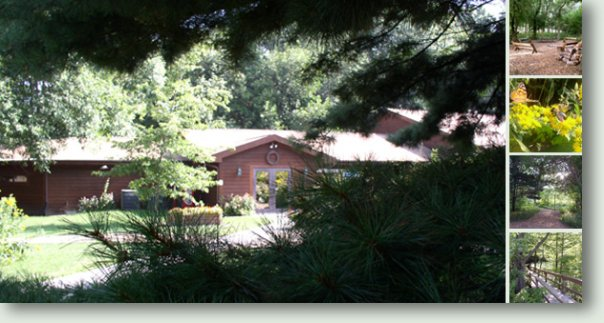
- Visitors' trails at Douglas–Hart Nature Center

- Location within Illinois
- Location: Mattoon, Coles County, Illinois, United States
- Area: 65 acres (26 ha)
- Designation: Nature reserve / Nature center
- Established: 1960s
- Governing body: Douglas–Hart Foundation (a 501(c)(3) nonprofit)
- Website: www.dhnature.org

The Douglas-Hart Nature Center, located in Mattoon, Illinois is a nature reserve that offers visitors different Illinois habitats, field programs, environmental educational classes, and volunteer opportunities for all ages.

In the 1960s, Helen Douglas-Hart and her foundation began work on a 33-acre nature preserve in Coles County, Illinois. Today, DHNC provides protection for three of Illinois primary habitats: tall grass prairie, native forest woodlands, and wetlands, on approximately 70 acres. There are two miles of trails that pass through each local habitat.

== Illinois Habitats ==
Conservation of the three environmental biotopes native to Illinois is the primary directive of Douglas-Hart Nature Center. The biological communities that compose Illinois tall grass prairies, native forest woodlands, and wetlands are area specific, including plant and animal inhabitants, soil and growth characteristics.

=== Tall Grass Prairies ===
The native tall grass prairies under protection of DHNC are the most important habitat on the conservancy site. Before widespread settling in Illinois, prairie habitat covered 2/3 of the state. Now, prairie grass covers less than 1% of Illinois. Given the rampant destruction of this endangered habitat, both plants and animals that require the conditions of this biotope have decreased exponentially. Some populations of grassland birds, over the last century, have declined by 95%. Figures such as these reiterate the important role conservancies such as DHNC play in maintaining Illinois habitats.

=== Wetlands ===
The aquatic habitats found at DHNC consist of natural wetlands. In many cases, wetlands, as we have come to know them, are modified or completely artificial. The wetlands on the conservancy site are made up of the following types:

- Forested Wetland,
- Sedge Meadow,
- Surface Pond, and
- Marshland.

Each of these aquatic environments supports various waterfowl, migratory birds, and provides breeding grounds for native species of reptiles and amphibians. These varied wetlands comprise 12 of the 70 acres at DHNC and are equipped with an observation or “lookout” area. However, the wetlands on the conservancy site are in danger. Like many of the natural wetland areas in Illinois, climatic shift is negatively impacting this natural biotope.""

=== Native Forest Woodlands ===
Native deciduous and coniferous trees comprise the majority of the woodlands at DHNC. According to a survey of the area conducted by The University of Illinois, native trees were present at the site in a 2:1 ratio. Also, the site boosts over 60 species of trees, many natives to the state of Illinois. Many of the trees native to the area are labeled for ease of identification by visitors. Even though this biotope is perhaps the best preserved of the three habitats at DHNC, woodlands in Illinois require just as much conservation as the others. Only 12% of the land area in Illinois remains forested, compared to 40% before European settling. This represents a nearly 75% decrease in forested area in the state of Illinois alone. Thus, the native forest woodlands are requiring just as much care as the other habitats.

== Douglas-Hart Nature Center's Plant Registry ==
The following list of live plants and trees at Douglas-Hart Nature Center, in Mattoon, Illinois, is supplied by specialists currently working at the conservancy site.

=== Native Plants of the Tallgrass Prairie Habitat ===
- Andropogon gerardi (big bluestem)
- Apocynum cannabinum (Indian hemp, prairie dogbane)
- Asclepias incarnata (swamp milkweed)
- Asclepias syriaca (common milkweed)
- Symphyotrichum novae-angliae (formerly "aster novae-angliae", New England aster)
- Astragalus canadensis (Canadian milk vetch)
- Baptisia alba (white indigo)
- Bidens aristosa (swamp marigold)
- Bouteloua curtipendula (sideoats grama)
- Chamaecrista fasciculata (partridge pea)
- Coreopsis tripteris (tall coreopsis, tall tickseed)
- Dalea candida (white prairie clover)
- Dalea purpurea (purple prairie clover)
- Desmanthus illinoensis (Illinois bundleflower, prairie mimosa)
- Desmodium sessilifolium (Sessile-leaved tick trefoil)
- Dodecatheon meadia (Midland Shooting Star)
- Echinacea pallida (pale purple coneflower)
- Echinacea purpurea (purple cone flower)
- Elymus canadensis (Canada wild rye)
- Erigeron strigosus (plains fleabane daisy)
- Eryngium yuccifolium (rattlesnake master)
- Eupatorium altissimum (bonest)
- Geranium carolinianum (Carolina cranesbill)
- Helianthus mollis (downy sunflower)
- Helianthus sp. (sunflower)
- Heliopsis helianthoides (ox-eye daisy; false sunflower)
- Hibiscus trionum (flower-of-an-hour)
- Lespedeza capitata (round-headed bush clover)
- Liatris spicata (dense blazing star)
- Monarda fistulosa (wild bergamot)
- Oenothera fruticosa (narrow-leaved sundrops)
- Parthenium integrifolium (wild quinine)
- Penstemon digitalis (foxglove beardtongue)
- Potentilla arguta (prairie cinquefoil)
- Potentilla recta (sulphur cinquefoil)
- Physostegia virginiana (obedient plant)
- Pycnanthemum tenuifolium (slender mountain mint)
- Pycnanthemum virginianum (sweet mountain mint, common mountain mint)
- Ratibida pinnata (grey-headed prairie coneflower)
- Rudbeckia hirta (black-eyed Susan)
- Rudbeckia triloba (brown-eyed Susan)
- Solanum carolinense (Carolina horse-nettle)
- Schizachyrium scoparium (little bluestem)
- Senna marilandica (wild senna, Maryland senna)
- Silphium integrifolium (rosinweed)
- Silphium laciniatum (compass plant)
- Silphium perfoliatum (cup plant)
- Silphium terebinthinaceum (prairie doc)
- Solidago rigida (stiff goldenrod)
- Solidago speciosa (showy goldenrod)
- Sorghastrum nutans (yellow Indian grass)
- Spartina pectinata (prairie cordgrass)
- Tradescantia ohiensis (Ohio spiderwort)
- Triodanis perfoliata (clasping Venus' looking-glass)
- Verbena stricta (hoary vervain)
- Vernonia fasciculata (common ironweed)
- Veronicastrum virginicum (culver's root)
- Zizia aurea (golden alexanders)

=== Invasive Species found on Site ===
- Alliaria petiolata (garlic root)
- Alnus glutinosa (black alder)
- Cirsium arvense (Canada thistle)
- Dipsacus fullonum (wild teasel)
- Elaeagnus umbellata (autumn olive)
- Lonicera maackii (Amur honeysuckle)
- Robinia pseudoacacia (black locust)
- Solidago canadensis (Canada goldenrod)
- Ulmus pumila (Siberian elm)

=== Native trees of the Woodland Habitat ===
- Quercus palustris (pin oak)
- Pinus strobus (eastern white pine)
- Rhus glabra (smooth sumac)
- Quercus alba (white oak)
- Acer negundo (box elder)
- Celtis occidentalis (northern hackberry)
- Sambucus canadensis (American elderberry)
- Quercus rubra (northern red oak)
- Prunus serotina (wild black cherry)
- Liquidambar styraciflua (sweet gum)
- Betula nigra (river birch)
- Crataegus mollis (red hawthorn)
- Platanus occidentalis (American sycamore)
- Cornus drummondii (roughleaf dogwood)
- Maclura pomifera (osage orange)
- Taxodium distichum (bald cypress)
- Quercus macrocarpa (bur oak)
- Acer saccharinum (silver maple)
- Juniperus virginiana (red cedar)
- Catalpa bignonioides (southern catalpa)
- Populus deltoides (cottonwood poplar)
- Cercis canadensis (eastern redbud)
- Cornus florida (flowering dogwood)
- Liriodendron tulipifera (tulip poplar)
- Acer rubrum (red maple)
- Diospyros virginiana (American persimmon)
- Nyssa sylvatica (sour gum)
- Juglans nigra (eastern black walnut)
- Fraxinus pennsylvanica (green ash)
- Fraxinus americana (white ash)
- Prunus americana (American plum)
- Viburnum recognitum (smooth arrowwood)

=== Native Plants of the Woodland Habitat ===
- Amsonia tabernaemontana (eastern bluestar)
- Aquilegia canadensis (Canada columbine)
- Arabis sp. (rock cress)
- Arisaema triphyllum (Jack-in-the-Pulpit)
- Asarum canadense (Canada wild ginger)
- Dodecatheon meadia (Midland Shooting Star)
- Erythronium albidum (white dogtooth violet)
- Erythronium americanum (yellow dogtooth violet)
- Geranium maculatum (wild geranium)
- Mertensia virginica (Virginia bluebell)
- Podophyllum peltatum (mayapple)
- Polemonium reptans (false Jacob's ladder)
- Polygonum virginianum (Virginia knotweed, jumpseed)
- Sambucus canadensis (American elderberry)
- Sanguinaria canadensis (bloodroot)
- Senecio sp. (butterweed)
- Smilacina racemosa (false Solomon's seal)
- Smilacina stellata (little false Solomon's seal)
- Tradescantia virginiana (Virginia spiderwort)
- Trillium sp. (wakerobin)
- Ribes missouriense (Missouri gooseberry)
- Viola sp. (violet)

== Visitor’s Center ==
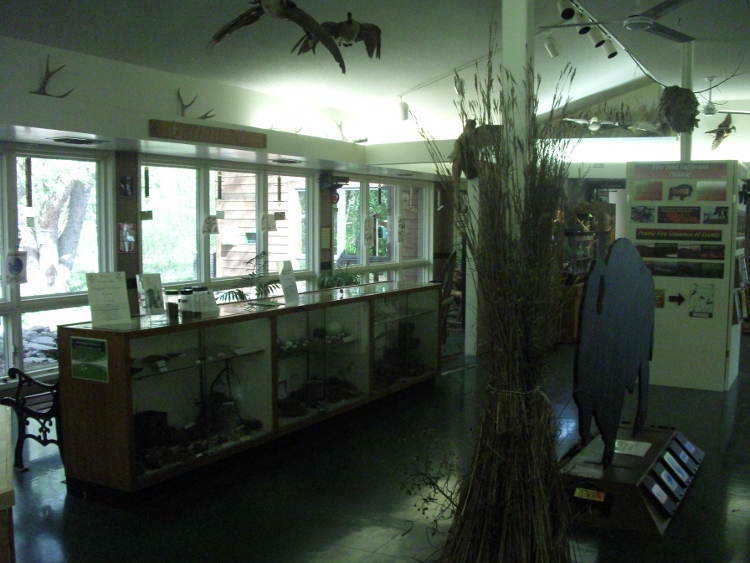

The visitor's facilities at Douglas-Hart Nature Center features interactive displays of local wild life, live reptiles and amphibians, a bird observation area, children's discovery den, library, classrooms and a gift shop. Programs are offered for families, children, school groups, scout groups and more.

== Hiking & Outdoor Recreation ==
Douglas-Hart Nature Center offers two miles of easily accessible, mapped trails to those interested in viewing the conservation site's habitats. There are five different trails on the property that tender distinct wildlife and biotope observations. There is also a picnic area.

== Publications ==
Douglas-Hart Nature Center produces its own quarterly news-letter titled, NutHatch News. The goal of the conservancy's publication is "to bring useful information to the community about DHNC, its programs, services, and staff, as well as helpful and interesting articles about nature and the environment".
