= Forest Preserve District of Will County =

Coordinates: 41°29′0.6″N 88°2′36.5″W

The Forest Preserve District of Will County was created by referendum on July 25, 1927, to preserve open spaces in Will County, Illinois, US. The first land acquisition was in 1930. As of December 2010, the District owns or manages 21,916 acres (8,869 ha) of land. Current Will County board members make up a board of commissioners, which oversees the affairs of the Forest Preserve District.

== Forest and nature preserves ==
The Forest Preserve District of Will County owns or manages land in 70 forest preserves, including 10 designated as Illinois Nature Preserves for their rare natural features. Many preserves offer amenities such as picnic shelters, campsites, canoe/kayak/boat launches, fishing access, ice skating ponds, playgrounds, and sled hills. The Forest Preserve District also operates three off-leash dog parks, which require a permit for use.

== Trails ==
The Forest Preserve District of Will County owns or manages more than 116 miles (187 km) of trails for biking, cross-country skiing, hiking, horseback riding, in-line skating, running, and/or snowshoeing, depending on the trail surface. Many of the trails are part of regional trail systems, such as the Grand Illinois Trail and the American Discovery Trail.

== Visitor centers ==
The district's visitor centers provide information regarding historical sites and natural settings along with environmental education. The visitor centers each provide unique services and have varying hours of operation. Seven visitor centers are located throughout Will County:

- Four Rivers Environmental Education Center, McKinley Woods - Kerry Sheridan Grove, Channahon
- Isle a la Cache Museum, Romeoville
- Lake Renwick Heron Rookery Visitor Center, Plainfield
- Monee Reservoir, Monee
- Plum Creek Nature Center at Goodenow Grove Nature Preserve, Beecher
- Sugar Creek Administration Center, Sugar Creek Preserve, Joliet

== Conservation and land management ==
In 2010, Will County's population was 677,560, 35% higher than in 2000, making it one of the nation's fastest-growing counties. As the population increases, there is a decrease in available land for open space. To preserve the limited open space, the Forest Preserve District of Will County acquires land through property sales, donations, and leases.

Once property is acquired, the Forest Preserve District implements its Land Management Program. The program involves protection, maintenance, restoration, or reconstruction of native ecosystems to preserve the diversity of native flora and fauna. This is accomplished through removal of invasive plant species, installation of native plant species, controlled burns, and other activities.

== Events and programming ==
Each year, family friendly special events are hosted by the Forest Preserve District of Will County. These events range from bike rides to festivals that are attended by thousands of people.

Smaller, more frequent programming offered by the Forest Preserve District provides individuals and families opportunities to learn and experience new things year-round. Learning to kayak, bird watching with a naturalist, and talking to an historical re-enactor are some of the programs that are typically offered.

The Forest Preserve District also offers environmental, historical, and cultural education programs for students in the classroom and at visitor centers throughout Will County as well as programming for youth groups.

== See also ==
- Thorn Creek Nature Center and Preserve
