= Community Unit School District 200 =

Community Unit School District 200 may refer to any of several school districts in Illinois:

- North Boone Community Unit School District 200 in Boone County
- Community Unit School District 200 (DuPage County, Illinois) — covering primarily Warrenville and Wheaton
- Woodstock Community Unit School District 200 in McHenry County
- Beecher Community Unit School District 200U in Will County
