= Milt Pappas =

American baseball player (1939–2016)

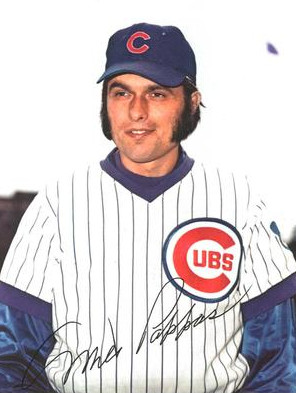
- Pappas in 1973 with the Chicago Cubs
- Pitcher
- Born: May 11, 1939; Detroit, Michigan, U.S.
- Died: April 19, 2016 (aged 76); Beecher, Illinois, U.S.
- Batted: Right Threw: Right

MLB debut
- August 10, 1957, for the Baltimore Orioles

Last MLB appearance
- September 18, 1973, for the Chicago Cubs

MLB statistics
- Win–loss record: 209–164
- Earned run average: 3.40
- Strikeouts: 1,728
- Stats at Baseball Reference

Teams
- Baltimore Orioles (1957–1965); Cincinnati Reds (1966–1968); Atlanta Braves (1968–1970); Chicago Cubs (1970–1973)

Career highlights and awards
- 3× All-Star (1962, 1962², 1965); Pitched a no-hitter on September 2, 1972; Baltimore Orioles Hall of Fame

Milton Steven Pappas (/ˈpæpəs/ PAP-əs; May 11, 1939 – April 19, 2016) was an American professional baseball player. He played in Major League Baseball as a right-handed pitcher from 1957 through 1973. Nicknamed "Gimpy", the 17-year veteran pitched for the Baltimore Orioles (1957–1965), Cincinnati Reds (1966–1968), Atlanta Braves (1968–1970) and Chicago Cubs (1970–1973). A control specialist, Pappas pitched in 520 games, starting 465, with 209 wins, 164 losses, 43 shutouts, 1,728 strikeouts and a 3.40 ERA in 3,186 innings pitched. He was a three-time All-Star player for the Orioles and was inducted into the Baltimore Orioles Hall of Fame in 1985. He was also a member of the 1960s Baltimore Orioles Kiddie Korps.

== Baltimore Orioles ==
Pappas was born in Detroit, Michigan, to Greek parents, and his birth name was Miltiades Stergios Papastergios. In 1957, as a senior at Cooley High School, Pappas was scouted by several teams and signed with the Orioles at the suggestion of Hal Newhouser, a former star pitcher for the Detroit Tigers who lived in the Detroit area. Pappas signed for $4,000 and pitched only three games in the minor leagues before being called up in August. He made his Major League debut on August 10 in relief against the New York Yankees. In 1958 he made the Orioles’ starting rotation and began a streak of 11 consecutive double-digit win seasons with a 10–10 record.

Pappas soon became the ace of the Orioles' staff, and was named an All-Star in 1962, pitching in both All-Star games (from 1959 to 1962, Major League Baseball had two All-Star games). He was also named starting pitcher in the 1965 All-Star Game. In each year from 1959 through 1965, Pappas never had a losing record, winning between 13 and 16 games.

In 1998, as Mark McGwire and Sammy Sosa surpassed Roger Maris’s single-season home run record, Pappas admitted that he threw nothing but fastballs to Maris in giving up Roger's 59th home run in 1961. Pappas explained that he was upset that commissioner Ford Frick was planning to list separately the new home run mark if Maris did not eclipse Babe Ruth's 60 home runs in 1927 on or before the Yankees’ 154th game.

== Cincinnati Reds ==
In December 1965, Pappas and another pitcher, Jack Baldschun, and outfielder Dick Simpson were traded to the Cincinnati Reds for superstar and future Baseball Hall of Famer Frank Robinson. Reds president Bill DeWitt believed that Robinson was "not a young 30." The outrage from the Cincinnati fans over the deal made it difficult for Pappas to adjust to pitching in Cincinnati. He posted a winning record in 1966 (12–11), but with a 4.29 ERA — more than a run above his career ERA to that point.

In 1967 Pappas won a team- and career-high 16 games, but when he got off to a slow start in 1968, he was dealt along with Bob Johnson and Ted Davidson by the Reds to the Atlanta Braves for Tony Cloninger, Clay Carroll and Woody Woodward on June 11, 1968.

== Atlanta Braves ==
Pappas went 10–8 for the Braves with a 2.37 ERA. In 1969 injuries sidelined him for much of the first four months of the season, and he won only six games with 10 losses with a 3.63 ERA. Yet Atlanta won the National League West title (both leagues were now split into two divisions after expanding from 10 teams to 12) for the franchise's first postseason berth since the 1958 World Series as the Milwaukee Braves, and Pappas finally achieved his goal of playing in the postseason. In the playoffs against the New York Mets, Pappas made his only post-season appearance, allowing three runs in three innings in relief.

== Chicago Cubs ==
In 1970, the Braves pulled Pappas from their rotation after only three starts after he compiled a 6.06 ERA and allowed six home runs. On June 23, they sold his contract to the Chicago Cubs, where he got another chance to prove he was still a major league starter. Pappas posted a 7–2 record with a 2.36 ERA at home and a 10–8 record with a 2.68 ERA overall.

In 1971, Pappas went 17–14 (the wins being a career best) with a 3.51 ERA. On September 24 of that year, against the Philadelphia Phillies at Wrigley Field, Pappas struck out all three batters on nine total pitches in the fourth inning of a 6–1 loss, becoming the 10th National League pitcher and the 16th pitcher in major-league history to accomplish an immaculate inning. Five days later, against the Montreal Expos at Jarry Park, Pappas was again part of baseball history, albeit on the other side, as he was responsible for Ron Hunt's 50th hit by pitch of the season, which broke the single-season record of 49 set by Hughie Jennings in 1896. Pappas complained unsuccessfully to home plate umpire Ken Burkhart that the pitch had been over the plate, and that Hunt had made no effort to get out of the way. (Later research credited Jennings with 51 HBPs, giving him the single-season record once again.)

In 1972, Pappas went 17–7 with a 2.77 earned run average, his best full-season ERA since his 2.60 in 1965, his last year in Baltimore. On September 2 of that year, at Wrigley Field, Pappas no-hit the San Diego Padres 8–0. He retired the first 26 batters and was one strike away from a perfect game with a 2–2 count on pinch-hitter Larry Stahl, but home-plate umpire Bruce Froemming called the next two pitches—both of which were close—balls. Pappas believed he had struck out Stahl, and even decades later in 2008, he continued to begrudge Froemming. Some 25 years later, a Chicago radio personality, during an interview with Pappas, got Froemming on the phone and the two argued on the air. Pappas also said in 2006 that he has seen videotape footage of that game on WGN and can see Froemming smirking immediately after the walk was issued; Froemming denied the charge.

Pappas ended the game by retiring the next batter, ex-Cub Garry Jestadt. Until Carlos Zambrano no-hit the Houston Astros on September 14, 2008, Pappas's had been the last no-hitter the Cubs had been involved in, either pitching it or having it pitched against them. They had gone the longest of all Major League teams since they had last been involved in a no-hitter. It was also the last no-hitter pitched at Wrigley Field until the Philadelphia Phillies' Cole Hamels no-hit the Cubs on July 25, 2015. Eleven days after his no-hitter, Pappas recorded his 200th career victory, also at Wrigley Field, defeating the Montreal Expos 6–2.

In 1973, he won only 7 games with 12 losses and a 4.28 ERA. He fell one victory short of joining Cy Young and Jim Bunning as the only pitchers to win at least 100 games in each the American and National Leagues at the time when he was released by the Chicago Cubs on April 2, 1974. He retired with 209 victories, becoming the first-ever 200-game winner who did not win 20 games in any one season—a feat later matched by Jerry Reuss, Frank Tanana, Charlie Hough, Dennis Martínez, Chuck Finley, Kenny Rogers, and Tim Wakefield.

During his career, Pappas was in the top 10 in ERA eight seasons, in wins six seasons, fewest walks per nine innings nine seasons, complete games seven seasons, shutouts eight seasons, and he was tied for the league lead with a perfect fielding percentage (1.000) in four seasons. Only posting a career .123 batting average, Pappas hit 20 home runs as a pitcher; as of 2020, he is one of 13 pitchers to hit at least 20 home runs. On August 27, 1961, while with the Orioles, Pappas pitched a two-hit, 3–0 shutout against the Minnesota Twins at Metropolitan Stadium and helped his own cause by homering twice off Pedro Ramos. Pappas also homered off Bill Stafford in the Orioles' 1–0 victory over the New York Yankees on April 18, 1962; he was the last American League pitcher in the pre-designated hitter era to hit a home run in a 1–0 game. No other American League pitcher accomplished this feat until Nathan Karns in 2015.

== Wife's disappearance ==
On September 11, 1982, Pappas’s wife, Carole, disappeared after leaving the couple's home in the Farnham subdivision in the Chicago suburb of Wheaton. For five years, no sign was found of her car, her clothing, or her body. One theory was that Carole Pappas was killed by a group of four men known as the Ripper Crew, as part of a satanic ritual. In 1984, Tom Kokoraleis, who was convicted for the murder of Lorraine Borowski, led police to a field where Carole Pappas was allegedly buried, but searchers could not find any remains.

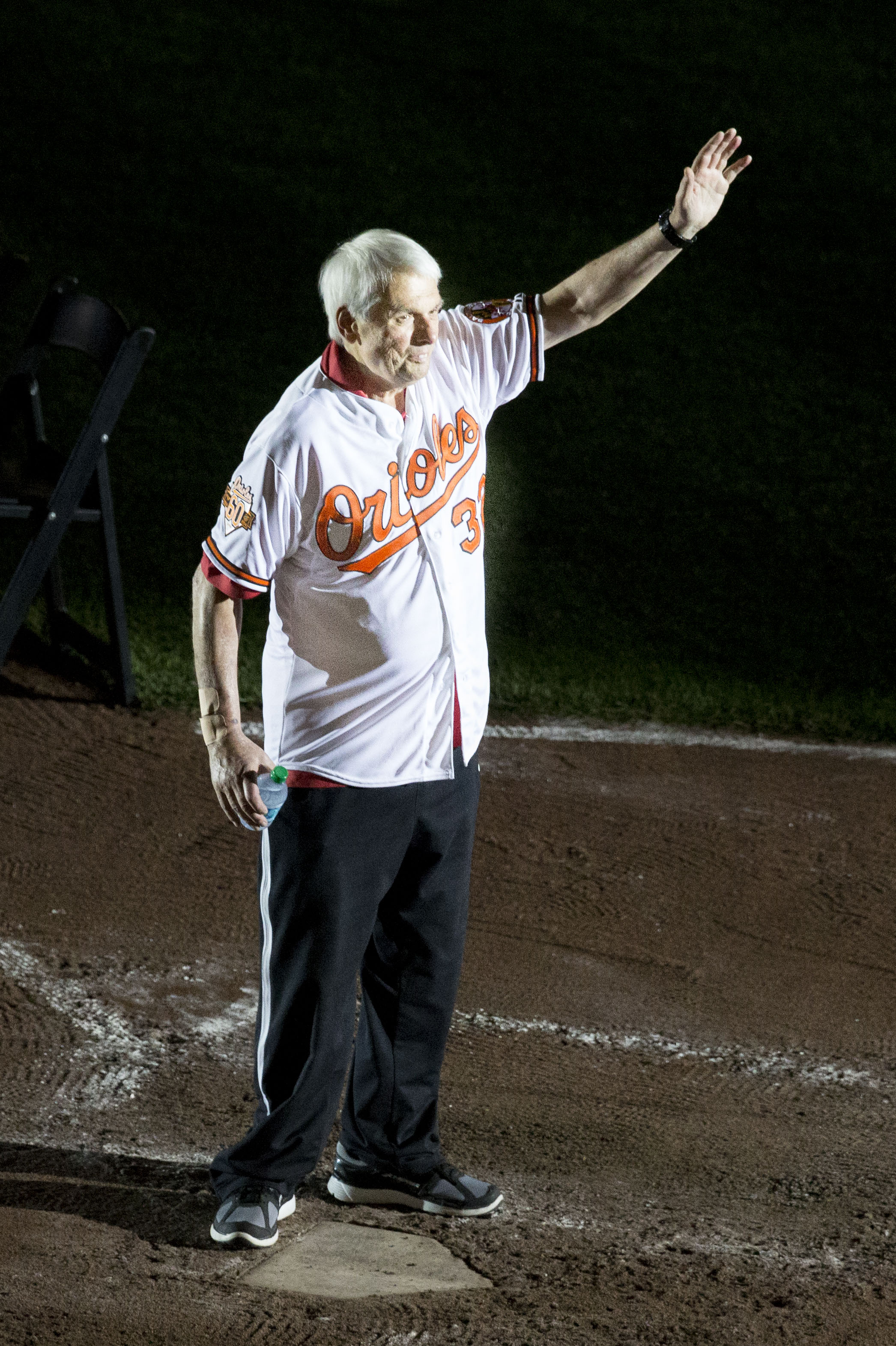
Pappas at the Baltimore Orioles' 60th Anniversary season postgame celebration on 8 August 2014.

On August 7, 1987, workers draining a shallow pond four blocks from the Pappas home discovered the car she had been driving, a white and burgundy 1980 Buick, as well as her body. A DuPage County coroner's jury ruled the cause of death as accidental drowning. Police theorized she mistook a driveway near the pond for a road leading to her subdivision, vaulting 25–30 feet (7.6–9.1 m) from the bank into the pond. Carole Pappas, a recovering alcoholic, may have been drinking; however, blood alcohol content could not be confirmed.

== Life outside baseball ==
Pappas managed the Chicago Storm of the American Professional Slow-Pitch League (APSPL) during their 1977 season. Former Cub teammate Gene Hiser played for the Storm.

Milt and Carole Pappas had two children, Michelle and Steve. Carole had been his childhood sweetheart and they were married 22 years. After baseball he owned a restaurant in Baltimore, Milt Pappas' Scotch & Sirloin; worked for a beer and wine distributor; and later sold building supplies.

In 1990, Pappas sold his house in Wheaton and moved with his second wife, Judi (Bloome), a teacher of special needs children, to Beecher, Illinois, with their 5-year-old daughter Alexandria. Judi is administrative dean of students at Crete-Monee High School.

He was seriously injured in a February 2013 single-vehicle accident in Kankakee County when he crashed into a utility pole and rolled his Jeep Cherokee, fracturing eight ribs and lacerating an ear. He was hospitalized several days before being released.

Pappas died of natural causes on April 19, 2016.

== See also ==
- List of Major League Baseball all-time leaders in home runs by pitchers
- List of Major League Baseball career wins leaders
- List of Major League Baseball no-hitters
- List of solved missing person cases: 1950–1999

Achievements
Preceded by Burt Hooton	No-hitter pitcher September 2, 1972	Succeeded by Bill Stoneman
