= Isle a la Cache =

Coordinates: 41.641°N 88.069°W

Isle a la Cache, a 101-acre riparian island, is located in the Des Plaines River in Romeoville, Illinois. The island is a forest preserve, owned and operated by the Forest Preserve District of Will County. The county has built the Isle a la Cache Museum on the island in celebration of the island's heritage in the North American fur trade.

== Description ==
Isle a la Cache is managed as an urban park and element of the Des Plaines River wildlife corridor. Birds sighted here include the belted kingfisher and the hooded merganser. Trees that grow on this silty, wet-footed island include the chinquapin oak and the black ash, although the ash trees of the Chicago area are, as of 2014, gravely threatened by the emerald ash beetle.

The island features a network of short trails, officially 0.44 miles in length, that connect the island by bridge with the Centennial Trail/I&M Canal Trail.
