= Lucas Spence =

American baseball player (born 2003)

Houston Astros – No. 28
- Outfielder
- Born: January 27, 2003 (age 23); Chicago Heights, Illinois, U.S.
- Bats: Left Throws: Left

MLB debut
- July 17, 2026, for the Houston Astros

MLB statistics (through 2026 season)
- Batting average: .218
- Home runs: 4
- Runs batted in: 12
- Stats at Baseball Reference

Teams
- Houston Astros (2026–present)

Lucas Edward Spence (born January 27, 2003) is an American professional baseball outfielder for the Houston Astros of Major League Baseball (MLB).

== Amateur career ==
Spence graduated from Crete-Monee High School in Crete, Illinois. He played college baseball at the Black Hawk College and Southern Illinois University Edwardsville. In summer 2024, he played collegiate summer baseball with the Rockford Rivets of the Northwoods League.

== Professional career ==
After going unselected in the 2024 Major League Baseball draft, Spence signed with the Houston Astros as an undrafted free agent. Spence made his professional debut with the Fayetteville Woodpeckers. He started 2025 with Fayetteville before being promoted to the Asheville Tourists and Corpus Christi Hooks.

After catching an 11-pound, 30 1/2-ounce (5.85-kilogram) walleye during the All-Star break, Spence had his contract selected by the Astros from the Triple–A Sugar Land Space Cowboys on July 17, 2026. He made his MLB debut in a 3–2 home loss to the Baltimore Orioles later that night, drawing a walk in his first plate appearance and hitting a leadoff single off Grant Wolfram in the seventh inning.

On September 24, 2026, despite previously having had only six hits in 40 at-bats in his MLB career, none of which were for extra bases, Spence hit three home runs in a game against the Athletics, in Sacramento, California. This made him only the third player in MLB history to hit his first three career home runs in the same game. Spence appeared in 19 games at the major league level, all in center field. In 63 plate appearances, Spence hit .218/.317/.509/.827, nine runs, 12 hits, seven walks, two doubles, one triple, four home runs, and 12 RBI. He made his playoff debut during the 2026 American League Wild Card Series, going 1-for-8 in both games prior to a sweep of the Astros by the Chicago White Sox.
