= Crete Monee Community Unit School District 201U =

School district in Illinois, United States

Crete-Monee School District 201-U

Address
- 690 West Exchange Street Crete, Will County, Illinois, 60417; United States

District information
- Type: Public
- Grades: PreK-12
- NCES District ID: 1711250

Students and staff
- Students: 4,902
- Teachers: 292
- District mascot: Warriors

Other information
- Website: www.cm201u.org

Crete-Monee Community Unit School District 201 U, more commonly known as District 201-U, is a unified public school district located in Crete, Illinois, in the south suburbs of Chicago, Illinois in the Chicago metropolitan area., United States. It serves the communities of Crete, Monee, University Park and portions of Park Forest. The district provides education for children from Pre-Kindergarten through 12th Grade.

== Schools ==
As of 2017, there are nine facilities in the district:

- Balmoral Elementary
- Coretta Scott King Magnet School
- Crete Elementary
- Crete-Monee High School
- Crete-Monee Middle School
- Early Learning Center
- Bridges
- Monee Elementary
- Talala Elementary

== Structure ==
Students in the district attend kindergarten through fifth grade at local elementary schools. They then go to the Middle School, which houses sixth through eighth grades. Gifted students may apply to CSK Magnet School from kindergarten through fifth grade. All students attend Crete-Monee Middle School from sixth to eighth grade, and Crete-Monee High School from ninth to twelfth grade. High school students have the opportunity to take Advanced Placement courses at the high school for college credit and may also apply to and attend classes at Kankakee Community College or Prairie State College to earn dual credit.
