= Isle a la Cache Museum =

Museum in Illinois, United States

- Location: 501 E. Romeo Road; Romeoville, Illinois
- Coordinates: 41.6397°N 88.0692°W
- Type: History
- Website: Isle a la Cache Museum

The Isle a la Cache Museum is a free-standing museum operated by the Forest Preserve District of Will County on Isle a la Cache, an island in the Des Plaines River. Located in Romeoville, Illinois, the museum and island are served by Illinois Route 53 and by the Centennial Trail/I&M Canal Trail. The museum's mission is to educate all visitors, especially children, about the fur-trading heritage of Chicago metropolitan area and Will County in particular. An unofficial mission statement posted on the museum's website says that it "offers visitors an adventure in 18th century history, when the 'Illinois Country' was home to French voyageurs and native Potawatomi."

== Description ==
The Des Plaines River island where this museum is built was used in the 18th century, prior to active occupation of the land by the new United States of America, by French-speaking Chicago-area coureurs de bois as a place to camp, store, and exchange goods used in the North American fur trade. The technologies used by Native Americans and their fur-trader visitors to hunt, fish, grow crops, and obtain furs and pelts are the focus of the museum.

Due to what was then a massive lacework of interconnected wetlands up and down the Illinois River, the Des Plaines River, the Chicago River, and their tributaries, the Illinois Country was a focus of the continent-wide fur trade. Many beaver, whose pelts were highly valued in Europe and China, lived up and down the rivers; they could be trapped and skinned, and their pelts sold. The Potawatomi nation, a network of tribal clans that lived around the shores of southern Lake Michigan, had a culture that centered around hunting. Many of their clan members enthusiastically cooperated with the trade.

The voyageurs who also participated in this trade were part of a chain of cultural links and economic ties that stretched northeast to Quebec. Many of the furs bought and sold here were stored in caches; when enough of them were gathered they would be tied into bales and sent by canoe to Montreal or southward, down the Des Plaines and Illinois, to New Orleans. Their French-language heritage became one of the first elements of the multilingual diversity of today's Will County.

== Activities ==
Today's Isle a la Cache Museum includes reconstructions of the longhouses and other camp structures that once housed trade participants here. The museum hosts educational public programs, including historical demonstrations and campfires. Its annual cycle of activities centers on the Island Rendezvous, a historical reenactment held annually since 1984 on the second Saturday of June.

The museum also includes an outdoor amphitheater.

As of 2020 the Isle a la Cache Museum is free and open to the public.
