= Green Garden Township, Illinois =

Coordinates: 41°25′59″N 87°51′17″W

Green Garden Township
- Township
- USA
- Country: United States
- State: Illinois
- County: Will
- Established: 1884

Area
  - Township: 36.67 sq mi (95.0 km^{2})
  - Land: 36.67 sq mi (95.0 km^{2})
  - Water: 0 sq mi (0 km^{2}) 0%
  - Urban: 2.0 sq mi (5.2 km^{2})
  - Metro: 0.0 sq mi (0 km^{2})
- Elevation: 246 ft (75 m)

Population (2010)
  - Estimate (2016): 3,991
  - Density: 109.4/sq mi (42.2/km^{2})
  - Urban: 23
  - Metro: o
- Subdivisions keep on being built.
- Time zone: UTC-6 (CST)
  - Summer (DST): UTC-5 (CDT)
- FIPS code: 17-197-31394
- Website: greengardentownship.com

Green Garden Township is located in Will County, Illinois, between the villages of Manhattan and Monee and straight south of Frankfort. The center of the township is the intersection of Manhattan-Monee and Center roads. From the center, the township extends three miles (5 km) in each direction; north, west, south, and east, for a total of 36 square miles (93 km^{2}).

== Geography ==
According to the 2010 census, the township has a total area of 36.67 square miles (95.0 km^{2}), all land. Its major roads are U.S. Route 45, Center Road, Manhattan-Monee Road, and Harlem Avenue.

Green Garden was treeless rolling prairie land when the township was organized in 1853, with a few streams and sloughs.

== Demographics ==
After the initial "Yankee settlement" by people from New England and New York State, most of the post-1851 settlers in Green Garden were German.

As of the 2010 census, its population was 4,010 and it contained 1,362 housing units.

Historical population
Census	Pop.	Note	%±
2016 (est.)	3,991
U.S. Decennial Census

== Education ==
Green Garden is a part of Peotone Community School District 207 - U.

== History ==
Green Garden Township was organized in 1853. Prior to that, it had been called Thornton, and "was included with Manhattan under the name of Carey."

Sparsely inhabited Green Garden was one of the last places in Will County to be occupied by settlers, due to its lack of timber.

=== Cyclone of 1917 ===
On May 26, 1917, Green Garden Township was hit by a devastating cyclone. The cyclone, which appeared to have multiple tornadoes, was visible from neighboring Peotone, and left a two to three mile wide path of destruction and crop damage as it moved from west to east through Will County.

The Green Garden town hall was reduced to kindling, while the schoolhouse across the road from it remained intact. In Green Garden and Monee townships, at least 50 horses and 100 cattle were killed, and 67 structures had to be rebuilt.
