= Monee Reservoir =

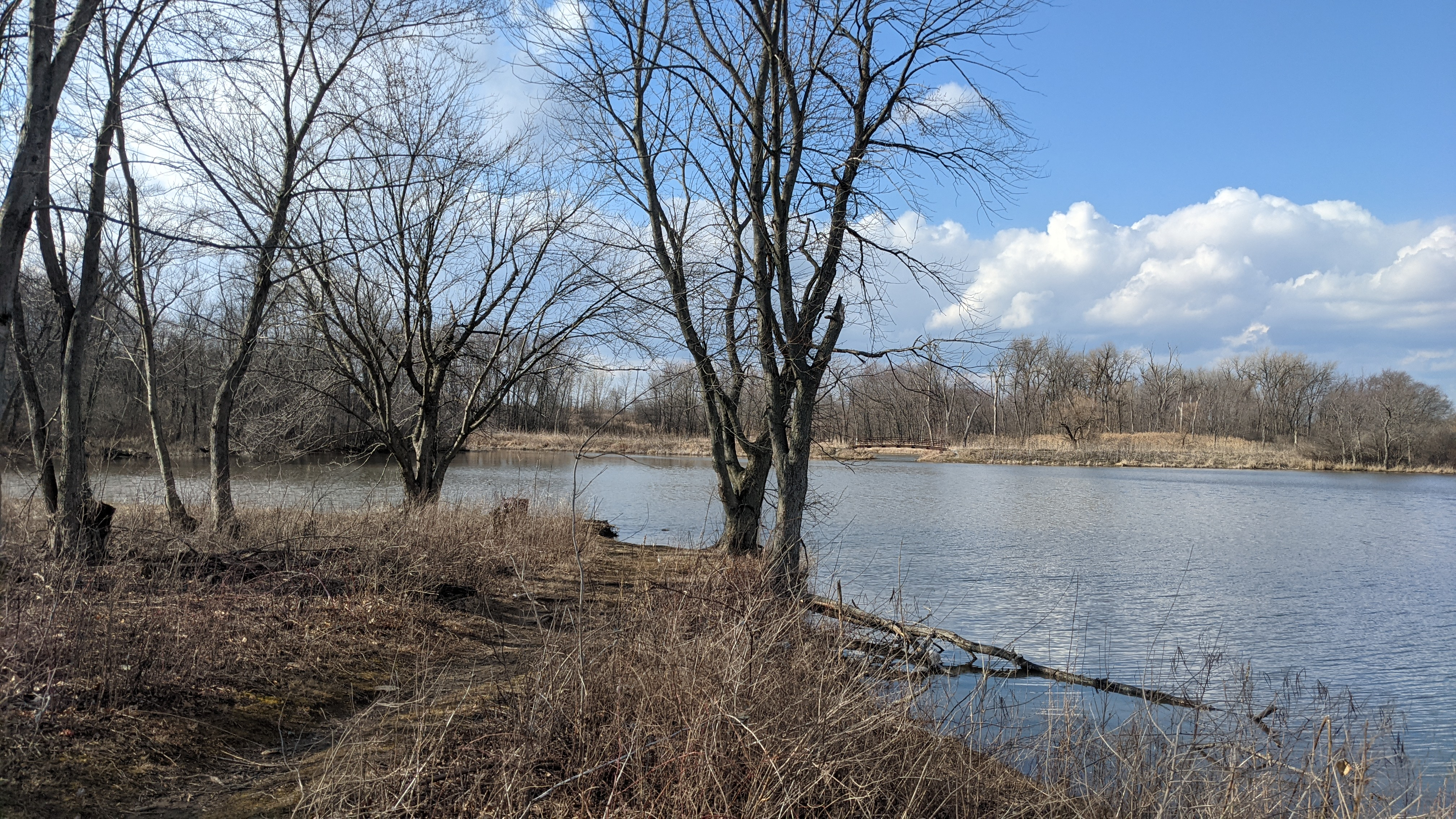
- Monee Reservoir as seen from the north side of the island within the reservoir.

- Location within Illinois Location within the United States
- Location: Will County, near Monee, Illinois
- Coordinates: 41°23′18″N 87°45′40″W
- Type: reservoir
- Basin countries: United States
- Surface area: 46 acres (19 ha)
- Max. depth: 24 ft (7.3 m)
- Surface elevation: 741 ft (226 m)

Monee Reservoir is a reservoir located in the town of Monee, Illinois. It is part of the Forest Preserve District of Will County.

== Geography ==
The 255 acres (103 ha) forest preserve contains a 46 acres (19 ha) reservoir lake. The terrain within the preserve is mostly flat, but contains a variety of ecosystems. It is mostly forest around the lake, but has scattered prairies. There are also many small marshes within the park, attracting many wetland species. The lake itself is shaped in an irregular way with many coves spurring out from it. It has a depth of 24 ft (7.3 m).

== Recreation ==
The preserve is open to the public daily. The lake provides boating and fishing opportunities. The reservoir is stocked with a variety of fish including Largemouth Bass, Channel Catfish, and Northern Pike. The preserve also features hiking trails, rentable picnic areas, and a concessions building which sells bait, Illinois fishing licenses, and snacks. Boats, fishing poles, and games can also be rented from the concessions building.
