= Thorn Creek Nature Center and Preserve =

Nature center in Northern Illinois

Coordinates: 41.46°N 87.69°W

Thorn Creek Woods Nature Center and Preserve is located in Will County, Illinois, near the municipality of Park Forest, Illinois. It is part of the Forest Preserve District of Will County. The entranceway to Thorn Creek Woods Nature Preserve is located at 247 Monee Road, approximately 0.25-mile (400 m) north of Stunkel Road, in Park Forest. The preserve is open 8:00 a.m. - dusk daily; the Nature Center is open 12:00 - 4:00 p.m. Friday- Sunday. At 830 acres (3.4 km^{2}), Thorn Creek Nature Preserve lies at the headwaters of Thorn Creek and consists of bottomlands, ravines, and white-oak forests interspersed with marsh and meadows. The actual nature center is located inside of an old church right off Monee Road. It is two stories and contains a nature library and nature exhibits. The trail starts behind the church and heads east into the woods. The topography varies. The trail starts off on high land before dropping down into the Thorn Creek River Valley. It then crosses the creek and goes up and out of the valley, again. The terrain is pretty rugged, especially near the river and its tributaries, because they have cut many gorges and ravines.

== See also ==
- Valparaiso Moraine
