= Patrick Schloss =

American psychologist and university administrator

8th president of Valdosta State University
- In office August 2008 – April 2011
- Preceded by: Ronald M. Zaccari
- Succeeded by: William J. McKinney

15th president of Northern State University
- In office 2004–2007
- Preceded by: John Hilpert

Personal details
- Born: Illinois, U.S.
- Education: Illinois State University, B.S., M.S.; University of Wisconsin–Madison, Ph.D.

Patrick Joseph Schloss is an American rehabilitation psychologist, educator, professor and university administrator. He served as president of Northern State University in Aberdeen, South Dakota, from 2004 to 2007, and president of Valdosta State University in Valdosta, Georgia from 2008 to 2011. Previously at Bloomsburg University of Pennsylvania, he served as acting president in 2004, provost and vice president of academic affairs from 2000 to 2003, assistant vice president for academic affairs and the dean of graduate studies, research and libraries from 1994 to 2000. Before that, Schloss was a professor of special education at the University of Missouri and Pennsylvania State University.

== Early life and education ==
Patrick Joseph Schloss was born in Illinois. His father was a football coach in the Chicago area. His maternal grandparents emigrated from Lebanon and his paternal grandfather emigrated from Russia.

Schloss attended Illinois State University in Normal, Illinois, and graduated with a Bachelor of Science degree in 1974. He earned a Master of Science degree in counseling two years later. In 1979, he completed his Ph.D. in rehabilitation psychology and special education at the University of Wisconsin–Madison.

== Career ==
Schloss joined Pennsylvania State University in 1982 and served until 1987 as the professor-in-charge of special education. In 1988, he became the professor and chair of the University of Missouri's Department of Special Education – a position he held until 1992. Starting in 1990, Schloss was also the director of research at the University of Missouri College of Education.

In 1994, Schloss joined the administration of Bloomsburg University of Pennsylvania in Bloomsburg, Pennsylvania. He was assistant vice president for academic affairs and the dean of graduate studies, research and libraries, before he became interim provost in May 2000. He was officially appointed as provost and vice president of academic affairs at Bloomsburg University in April 2001. During his tenure, Bloomsburg University increased enrollment by more than 12%, began offering an undergraduate engineering program, and awarded its first doctoral degrees. For his last year at the university, Schloss served as acting president.

Schloss moved to Aberdeen, South Dakota, when he was appointed in March 2004 to serve as president of Northern State University (NSU). He succeeded John Hilpert to become the 15th president of NSU. When Schloss took over at NSU, the university had an enrollment of 2,300, down from 2,600 the year before. With the lowest enrollment among South Dakota's six public universities, only four of the six dormitories on the campus were in use. By fall 2005, enrollment was up 10.6%. Schloss had implemented a plan called Margin of Excellence with the aim to "attract new students, retain students and enhance the school's academic reputation". In 2007, NSU was ranked second by U.S. News & World Report among public undergraduate colleges and universities in the Midwest.

In June 2008, Schloss was appointed the eighth president of Valdosta State University in Valdosta, Georgia. In September of the same year, Schloss announced that the university would be modifying its policies on free speech to address complaints by the Foundation for Individual Rights in Education. The foundation subsequently removed the university from its Red Alert list. During his three-year tenure, enrollment at the university increased by 1,600 students. Schloss served as president of Valdosta State until summer 2011 when he stepped down to take a position in the University System of Georgia (USG), the parent institution of Valdosta State. Schloss would help with an initiative to improve graduation and retention rates at the USG.

During his decades-long academic career, Schloss wrote 15 books and more than 100 articles for peer-reviewed journals. He has also served as editor or consulting editor for several journals.

== Personal life ==
Schloss was married to his first wife, Cynthia Nelson Schloss, for 30 years and they had three children before she died of cancer in 2003. He married Maureen Smith-Schloss in 2004. They live in Valdosta, Georgia.

== Selected bibliography ==
=== Books ===
- Schloss, Patrick J.; Milliren, Alan P. (1975). Learning Aids: Teacher-made Instructional Devices. Thomas. ISBN 978-0-398-03261-6.
- —; Miller, Sidney R. (1982). Career-Vocational Education for Handicapped Youth. Aspen Systems Corporation. ISBN 978-0-89443-685-7.
- — (1985). Strategies for Teaching Handicapped Adolescents: A Handbook for Secondary Level Educators. Pro-Ed. ISBN 978-0-8391-1823-7.
- —; Hughes, Charles A.; Smith, Maureen A. (1988). Mental Retardation: Community Transition. Little, Brown. ISBN 978-0-316-77364-5.
- —; Alper, Sandra K.; Schloss, Cynthia N. (1994). Families of Students with Disabilities: Consultation and Advocacy. Allyn and Bacon. ISBN 978-0-205-14038-1.
- —; Smith, Maureen A. (1998). Applied Behavior Analysis in the Classroom. Allyn and Bacon. ISBN 978-0-205-19683-8.
- —; Smith, Maureen A. (1999). Conducting Research. Prentice Hall. ISBN 978-0-02-407370-9.
- —; Smith, Maureen A.; Schloss, Cynthia N. (2007). Instructional Methods for Secondary Students with Learning and Behavior Problems. Pearson Allyn & Bacon. ISBN 978-0-205-44236-2.

=== Chapters and articles ===
- Schloss, Patrick J.; Gajar, A; et al. (1984). "Effects of feedback and self-monitoring on head trauma youths' conversation skills". Journal of Applied Behavior Analysis. 17 (3): 353–358. doi:10.1901/jaba.1984.17-353. PMC 1307951. PMID 6511701.
- — (January 1992). "Mainstreaming Revisited". The Elementary School Journal. 92 (3): 233–244. doi:10.1086/461690. ISSN 0013-5984. S2CID 222330299.
- —; Ruhl, Kathy L.; et al. (January 1987). "Using the Pause Procedure to Enhance Lecture Recall". Teacher Education and Special Education: The Journal of the Teacher Education Division of the Council for Exceptional Children. 10 (1): 14–18. doi:10.1177/088840648701000103. ISSN 0888-4064. S2CID 145076874.
- —; Wisniewski, Lech A.; Cartwright, G. Phillip (May 1988). "The Differential Effect of Learner Control and Feedback in College Students' Performance on CAI Modules". Journal of Educational Computing Research. 4 (2): 141–150. doi:10.2190/XJYY-TX9V-DHGQ-5Q50. ISSN 0735-6331. S2CID 61319761.
- —; Alper, Sandra; et al. (December 1993). "Self-Determination for Persons with Disabilities: Choice, Risk, and Dignity". Exceptional Children. 60 (3): 215–225. doi:10.1177/001440299406000303. ISSN 0014-4029. S2CID 143004942.
- —; Trammel, Diana Lynn; et al. (February 1994). "Interventions: Using Self-Recording, Evaluation, and Graphing to Increase Completion of Homework Assignments". Journal of Learning Disabilities. 27 (2): 75–81. doi:10.1177/002221949402700202. ISSN 0022-2194. PMID 8195690. S2CID 220679559.
- —; Alper, Sandra; et al. (April 1995). "Acquisition of Functional Sight Words in Community-Based Recreation Settings". The Journal of Special Education. 29 (1): 84–96. doi:10.1177/002246699502900105. ISSN 0022-4669. S2CID 145372870.
- —; Alper, Sandra; et al. (December 1995). "Families of Children with Disabilities in Elementary and Middle School: Advocacy Models and Strategies". Exceptional Children. 62 (3): 261–270. doi:10.1177/001440299606200307. ISSN 0014-4029. S2CID 145773080.
- —; Kobza, Sibyl A.; Alper, Sandra (1997). "The Use of Peer Tutoring for the Acquisition of Functional Math Skills Among Students with Moderate Retardation". Education and Treatment of Children. 20 (2): 189–208. ISSN 0748-8491.
- — (February 7, 2014). "Microtraining". In Reynolds, Cecil R; Vannest, Kimberly J; Fletcher-Janzen, Elaine (eds.). Encyclopedia of Special Education. Hoboken, NJ, USA: John Wiley & Sons, Inc. doi:10.1002/9781118660584.ese1557. ISBN 978-1-118-66058-4.
