= Crete, Illinois =

Crete
- Village
- Motto: "Gateway to the Southland"
- Location of Crete in Will and Cook Counties, Illinois.
- Coordinates: 41°26′36″N 87°37′45″W
- Country: United States
- State: Illinois
- County: Will
- Founded: 1836
- Founder: Dyantha Wood, Willard Wood & Gary Neal

Area
  - Total: 9.47 sq mi (24.52 km^{2})
  - Land: 9.45 sq mi (24.47 km^{2})
  - Water: 0.015 sq mi (0.04 km^{2})
- Elevation: 735 ft (224 m)

Population (2020)
  - Total: 8,465
  - Density: 896.0/sq mi (345.9/km^{2})
- Time zone: UTC−6 (CST)
  - Summer (DST): UTC−5 (CDT)
- ZIP Code: 60417
- Area code: 708
- FIPS code: 17-17523
- GNIS feature ID: 2398650
- Website: villageofcrete.org

Crete is a village in Will County, Illinois, United States. It is a far south suburb of Chicago, 30 miles from the Loop and only 6 miles from the Indiana border. The population was 8,465 at the 2020 census. Originally named Wood's Corner, it was founded in 1836 by Vermonters Dyantha Wood, Willard Wood & Gary Neal.

== Geography ==
According to the 2010 census, Crete has a total area of 9.627 square miles (24.93 km^{2}), of which 9.61 square miles (24.89 km^{2}) (or 99.82%) is land and 0.017 square miles (0.04 km^{2}) (or 0.18%) is water. Crete is located about 2 miles (3.2 km) west of Illinois Route 394 and within 40 miles (64 km) of downtown Chicago. Willow Brook Estates, an unincorporated area between Crete and the Indiana border, uses the Crete postal code and is considered an eastern extension of the village.

== Demographics ==
Historical population
Census	Pop.	Note	%±
1880	539		—
1890	641		18.9%
1900	700		9.2%
1910	840		20.0%
1920	945		12.5%
1930	1,429		51.2%
1940	1,772		24.0%
1950	2,298		29.7%
1960	3,464		50.7%
1970	4,656		34.4%
1980	5,417		16.3%
1990	6,773		25.0%
2000	7,346		8.5%
2010	8,259		12.4%
2020	8,465		2.5%
U.S. Decennial Census 2020 U.S. Census

As of the July 2021 U.S. census, there were 8,407 people, 3,300 households, and 2.52 people per household. The median household income was $80,718 in 2021 dollars, and 5.3% of people were below the poverty line.

The median value of owner-occupied housing units from 2017 to 2021 was $172,700 in 2021 dollars, and the median gross rent was $1,111. In 2021, 94.6% of households had a computer.

In 2021, the racial makeup of the village was 57.8% White Alone, 31.8% African American, 0.3% Native American and Alaska Native, 0.5% Asian, and 0.3% Multiracial. Hispanic or Latino people of any race were 8.7% of the population. 3.6% of people living in Crete were born outside of the U.S.

In 2021, 18.5% of people were under the age of 18, 3.3% were under 5 years old, and 26.6% were 65 years of age or older. In total, 53.3% of residents were female, and from 2017 to 2021 there were 486 veterans and 154 employer firms.

=== Racial and ethnic composition ===
Crete village, Illinois – Racial and ethnic composition Note: the US Census treats Hispanic/Latino as an ethnic category. This table excludes Latinos from the racial categories and assigns them to a separate category. Hispanics/Latinos may be of any race.
Race / Ethnicity (NH = Non-Hispanic)	Pop 2000	Pop 2010	Pop 2020	% 2000	% 2010	% 2020
White alone (NH)	6,192	5,177	4,048	84.29%	62.68%	47.82%
Black or African American alone (NH)	759	2,293	3,044	10.33%	27.76%	35.96%
Native American or Alaska Native alone (NH)	2	18	17	0.03%	0.22%	0.20%
Asian alone (NH)	55	87	75	0.75%	1.05%	0.89%
Native Hawaiian or Pacific Islander alone (NH)	1	5	1	0.01%	0.06%	0.01%
Other race alone (NH)	2	16	45	0.03%	0.19%	0.53%
Mixed race or Multiracial (NH)	68	140	346	0.93%	1.70%	4.09%
Hispanic or Latino (any race)	267	523	889	3.63%	6.33%	10.50%
Total	7,346	8,259	8,465	100.00%	100.00%	100.00%

=== 2020 census ===
As of the 2020 census, Crete had a population of 8,465. The median age was 45.7 years. For every 100 females there were 93.0 males, and for every 100 females age 18 and over there were 89.6 males age 18 and over. At that time, the population density was 899.7 inhabitants per square mile.

As of the 2020 census, 19.8% of residents were under the age of 18 and 21.7% were 65 years of age or older. In total, 99.3% of residents lived in urban areas, while 0.7% lived in rural areas.

As of the 2020 census, there were 3,263 households in Crete, of which 28.7% had children under the age of 18 living in them. Of all households, 48.9% were married-couple households, 17.2% were households with a male householder and no spouse or partner present, and 27.8% were households with a female householder and no spouse or partner present. About 26.1% of all households were made up of individuals and 13.1% had someone living alone who was 65 years of age or older.

As of the 2020 census, there were 3,384 housing units, of which 3.6% were vacant. The homeowner vacancy rate was 1.5% and the rental vacancy rate was 5.6%.

== Education ==
All public schools in Crete are managed by Crete Monee Community Unit School District 201U, which is a unit school district which combines elementary, middle, and high schools. Serving the village of Crete are:

- Crete Elementary School (pre-kindergarten through 5th grade)
- Balmoral Elementary School (pre-kindergarten through 5th grade)
- Crete Monee Middle School (6th through 8th grade)
- Crete-Monee High School (9th through 12th grades)
- Gary Neal High School (9th through 12th grade)

Illinois Lutheran is a Pre-K to 12th grade school of the Wisconsin Evangelical Lutheran Synod in Crete.

Governors State University is in University Park, which borders Crete.

== Local attractions ==
- Crete is home to Balmoral Park Racetrack.
- The forest preserve along with Plum Creek (Goodenow Grove), a park with ice skating and sledding in the winter, and hiking in the summer. (Goodenow Grove does, however, have a Beecher, Illinois address.)
