= Beecher High School (Illinois) =

Location
- 538 Miller St, Beecher, Illinois 60401; United States; 41.5138°N 87.9298°W

Information
- Type: Public secondary
- Established: 1954; 72 years ago
- School district: Beecher Community Unit School District 200U
- Principal: Mike Meyer
- Teaching staff: 24.00 (FTE)
- Grades: 9–12
- Gender: Co-educational
- Enrollment: 347 (2023–2024)
- Student to teacher ratio: 14.46
- Campus size: 30 acres (12 ha)
- Area: South Suburbs
- Campus type: Suburban
- Colors: Orange; Black
- Song: On, You Bobcats!
- Athletics conference: River Valley Conference
- Mascot: Bobcat
- Team name: Bobcats (males) / Ladycats (females)
- Newspaper: The Bobcat's Advocate
- Yearbook: Promethean
- Website: www.beecher200u.org/bhs

Beecher High School or BHS is a public four-year high school located in Beecher, Illinois, USA. It is operated by Beecher Community Unit School District 200U.

== History ==
Beecher Community Unit School District 200-U is one of the longest surviving school districts in Will County. The high school's location has changed twice since 1954, due to overpopulation in the growing community. Construction began on the current Beecher High School in 2000, barely being completed at the start of the school year on September 4, 2001.

== Student demographics and characteristics ==
The current enrollment at Beecher High School is 679. The ethnic breakdown of the school is 89.6% White, 7% Hispanic/Latino and 3.4% all others. 13.8% of students lie within the low income bracket. The attendance rate is 94%, and the graduation rate is 93.2%.

== Academics ==
BHS offers a wide variety of curriculum for its students to choose from. Departments include Agriculture, Business, Family and Consumer Sciences, Industrial Technology, Media and Technology, English, Foreign Language (Spanish is the only Foreign Language offered after the Class of 2009), Fine Arts, Mathematics, Health and Physical Education, Science, and Social Studies. Beecher offers Advanced Placement courses in US History, English Language and Composition, English Literature and Composition, Chemistry and Calculus AB. Beecher also has a Special Education program.

In 2010, 60% of juniors met or exceeded on the PSAE, 7% higher than the statewide average.

Juniors and seniors also have the opportunity to attend Kankakee Area Career Center located in Bourbonnais, Illinois. The center primarily offers vocational classes for a portion of the official school day, each offering worth 1.5 credits per semester. Departments include Automotive Technology, Business Technology, Child Development, Collision Repair, Computer Technology, Construction Technology, Cosmetology, Drafting/CAD, Fire/Rescue, Health Occupations, Law Enforcement, Precision Metals and Welding Technology.
