= Goodenow Grove Nature Preserve =

Coordinates: 41.404°N 87.602°W

Goodenow Grove Nature Preserve is a unit of the Forest Preserve District of Will County located in Crete Township in Will County, Illinois. The closest town is Crete, Illinois. The preserve covers 898 acres (3.63 km^{2}) and contains 4 miles (6.4 km) of trails and a man-made 40-foot (12 m) hill which is a sledding hill in the winter.

Goodenow Grove Nature Preserve contains mostly woods, but has some prairie. It is moderately hilly with one small pond. Plum Creek crosses the preserve.

Amenities include primitive campsites, picnic shelters available for reservation, and an ice-skating pond when conditions allow.

In 1996, Goodenow Grove was dedicated as a State Nature Preserve for its diverse ecosystems, including forests, floodplain, seeps, savanna, prairies, meadows, and marshes. The nature preserve provides protection for the habitat of state-threatened or endangered species, including the eastern massasauga rattlesnake, the spotted coral root orchid, and more.

== Plum Creek Nature Center ==
The nature preserve features the Plum Creek Nature Center, one of several nature centers and visitor centers operated by the Forest Preserve District of Will County. The Center features hands-on nature exhibits. Outside there is a natural playscape for outdoor educational experiences including a pollinator garden, rain garden and interactive play elements. There is also a bird observation area, including birdhouses fitted with "Spy-On-A-Bird" cameras.
