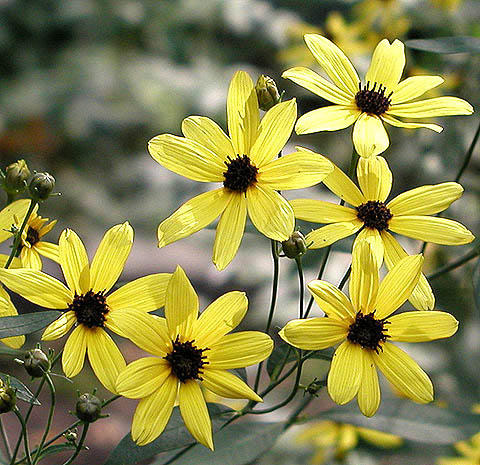

Conservation status
- Secure (NatureServe)

Scientific classification
- Kingdom: Plantae
- Clade: Tracheophytes
- Clade: Angiosperms
- Clade: Eudicots
- Clade: Asterids
- Order: Asterales
- Family: Asteraceae
- Subfamily: Asteroideae
- Tribe: Coreopsideae
- Genus: Anacis
- Species: A. tripteris

Binomial name
- Anacis tripteris (L.) Schrank

Synonyms
- Bidens tripteris (L.) E.H.L.Krause; Chrysostemma tripteris (L.) Less.; Coreopsis tripteris L.; Coreopsis tripteris var. deamii Standl.; Coreopsis tripteris var. intercedens Standl.; Coreopsis tripteris var. smithii Sherff; Coreopsis tripteris var. subrhomboidea Sherff; Gyrophyllum tripteris (L.) Mesfin & D.J.Crawford

= Anacis tripteris =

Species of flowering plant

Anacis tripteris (synonym Coreopsis tripteris) is a North American species of flowering plant in the family Asteraceae. It is widespread across much of eastern and central North America from the Florida Panhandle west as far as eastern Texas and north to Québec and Ontario. Its common names include tall tickseed, tall coreopsis, and Atlantic coreopsis.

This perennial herb usually reaches nearly 100 cm (40 inches) in height, sometimes approaching 200 cm (80 inches). The leaves are mostly divided into 3 leaflets which are smooth-edged to lobed and several centimeters long. The flower heads have yellow ray florets 1 to 2 cm (0.4 to 0.8 in) long, or longer. The center of the head has many disc florets in shades of reddish brown to purplish. It produces short, stout rhizomes.

This plant grows in moist habitat, such as streambanks and wet meadows. It flowers in summer.

This plant is commercially available for use in cultivation as an ornamental.
