= James "Pate" Philip State Park =

State park in DuPage County and Kane County, Illinois

- IUCN category III (natural monument or feature)
- Location within Illinois Location within the United States
- Location: DuPage and Kane County Illinois, US
- Nearest city: Bartlett, Illinois
- Coordinates: 41°58′54″N 88°15′32″W
- Area: 3,432 acres (1,389 ha)
- Established: 1991
- Governing body: Illinois Department of Natural Resources

James "Pate" Philip State Park, originally known as Tri-County State Park, is an Illinois state park in DuPage County and Kane County, Illinois, United States.

The park is named after James "Pate" Philip, a Republican politician.

== Bartlett Nature Center ==
Bartlett Nature Center is located in the park's visitor center and is operated by the Bartlett Park District. The center features natural history displays in its museum and offers environmental education programs for schools, scouts and other groups.
