= Crete-Monee High School =

Public high school in Crete, Illinois, US

Location
- 1515 W. Exchange Street; Crete, Illinois 60417; United States; 41.4418°N 87.6496°W

Information
- Type: Public high school
- Established: 1948
- Principal: Lamont Holifield
- Teaching staff: 93.00 (on an FTE basis)
- Grades: 9–12
- Enrollment: 1,503 (2023–2024)
- Student to teacher ratio: 16.16
- Area: South Suburbs
- Campus type: suburban
- Colors: Blue; Yellow
- Athletics conference: Southland Athletic Conference
- Mascot: Warrior
- Newspaper: The Informer
- Website: cmhs.cm201u.org

Crete-Monee High School (CMHS) is a four-year public high school located in Crete, Illinois, a far south suburb of Chicago, in the United States. Known colloquially as Crete, the high school houses students representing the surrounding communities of Crete, Monee, University Park, and portions of Park Forest.

== History ==
The high school's current building was completed in 2007 at a cost of $60 million. Since its completion, its previous building, built in 1954 on an adjacent property, held the Crete-Monee Sixth Grade Center on its main floor. Following completion of an additional wing in 2016, the Crete-Monee Middle School now houses all students in sixth through eighth grades. As such, the old high school building (known for its athletic dome) is no longer in use by students.

== Academics ==
Students were previously administered the PSAE (Prairie State Achievement Exam) in their junior year to gauge performance and college readiness. This exam was a requirement under the No Child Left Behind Act. However, in 2015, this act was replaced by the Every Student Succeeds Act and the PSAE was discontinued. The school is a participant in Project Lead the Way, a program created by a not-for-profit of the same name which works to create STEM curricula in U.S. primary and secondary schools. Advanced Placement courses are available beginning in a student's sophomore year and include options such as Language and Composition, Literature and Composition, Calculus A/B, Statistics, World History, U.S. History, Psychology, and Environmental Science. Additionally, students may apply to and attend classes at Kankakee Community College in Kankakee, IL or Prairie State College in Chicago Heights, IL as part of the high school's dual credit program. As of 2016, 35.7% of students were participating in early college coursework, or high school coursework that may result in early college credit.

== Activities ==
Crete-Monee students participate in extracurricular activities including those listed below.

=== Activities offered ===
Art Club	Book Club	Broadcasting Club	Chess Team
Drama Club	E-Journalism	Foreign Language Club	Math Team
Music Organization	Music Solo & Ensemble	Music: Instrumental	Scholastic Bowl
Science Club	Speech Individual Events	Student Council	S.A.D.D.
Technical Theater Club	Women's Empowerment	Yearbook Club	E-sports

== Athletics ==
On November 23, 2012, the Warriors defeated Cary Grove High School, capturing the first state football championship in school history.

=== Sports offered ===
Fall	Winter	Spring
Football	Boys Basketball	Baseball
Boys Cross Country	Girls Basketball	Softball
Boys Soccer	Girls Bowling	Boys Tennis
Girls Cross Country	Wrestling	Boys Track
Girls Swimming	Winter Guard	Girls Track
Girls Tennis		
Girls Volleyball		
Girls Flag Football		
Golf		
Marching Band		

== Notable alumni ==
- Laquon Treadwell, NFL Wide Receiver for the Indianapolis Colts
- Lance Lenoir, NFL former wide receiver for the Buffalo Bills
- Nyles Morgan, CFL player for the Edmonton Elks
- Chris Slayton, NFL player
- Clint Ratkovich, professional football player
- Lucas Spence, MLB, Outfielder for the Houston Astros
- Alexandra Grey, is an actress and singer who plays Melody Barnes on the Fox television series Empire.
- Rudy Horne, was an American mathematician and professor at Morehouse College.
- Patrick Schloss, psychologist, author, researcher, and former president of Northern State University and Valdosta State University
