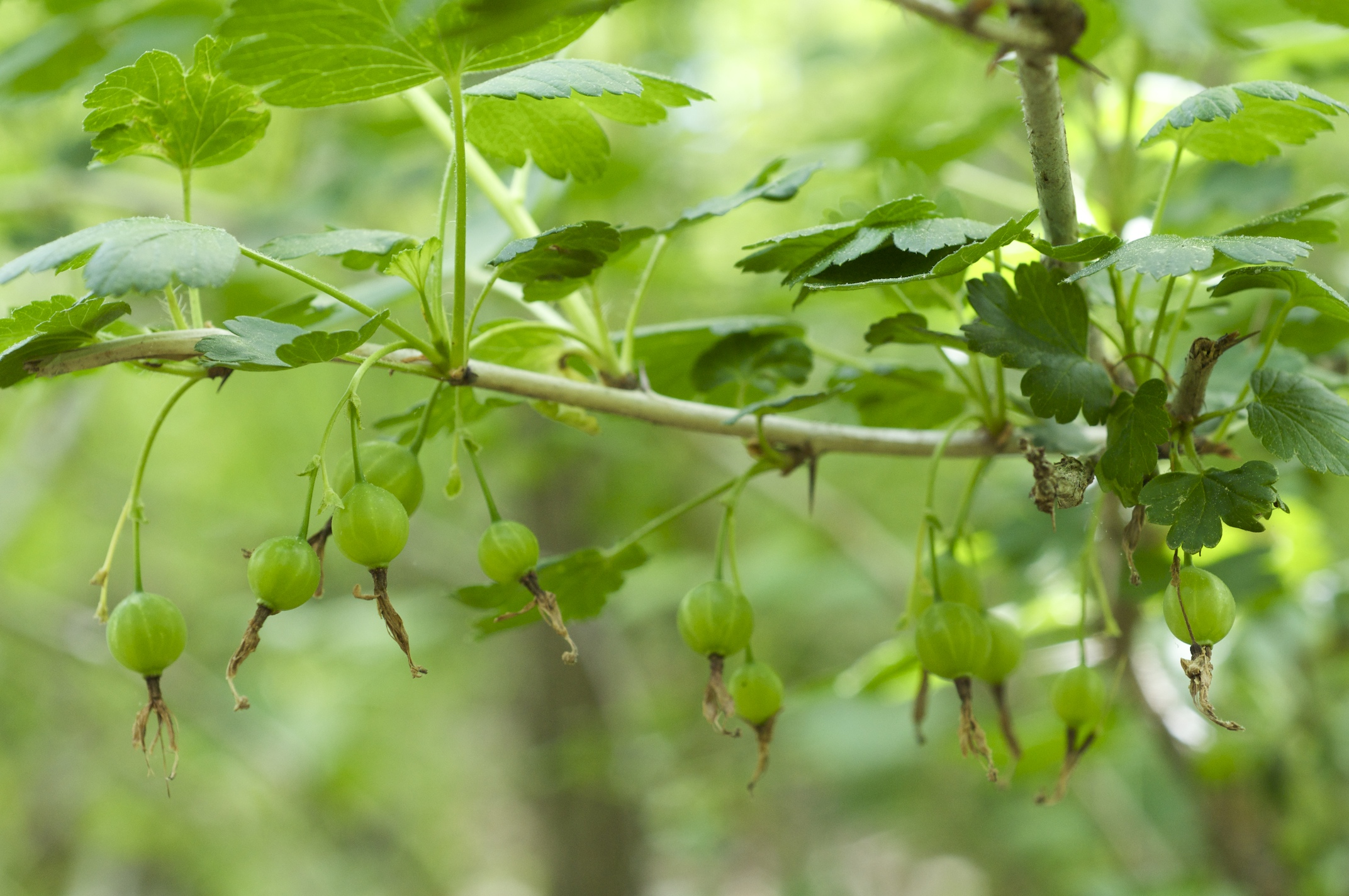

Scientific classification
- Kingdom: Plantae
- Clade: Tracheophytes
- Clade: Angiosperms
- Clade: Eudicots
- Order: Saxifragales
- Family: Grossulariaceae
- Genus: Ribes
- Species: R. missouriense

Binomial name
- Ribes missouriense Nutt ex Torr. & A.Gray

Synonyms
- Ribes missouriense var. ozarkanum Fassett; Grossularia missouriensis (Nutt.) Coville & Britton

= Ribes missouriense =

Missouri gooseberry

Species of plant

Ribes missouriense, the Missouri gooseberry, Missouri currant or wild gooseberry, is a prickly, many-stemmed shrub native to the north-central United States (Great Lakes, upper Mississippi and lower Missouri Valleys). Scattered populations have been found further east, most of them likely escapes cultivation.

The Missouri gooseberry was once common as far east as Ohio, but was nearly extirpated there during the 19th and 20th centuries (partly due to early 20th-century efforts to prevent the spread of white pine blister rust by removing as many Ribes hosts as possible). Since 1982, however, the Missouri gooseberry has been granted protected status as an endangered species in Ohio, It is also endangered in New Jersey and Pennsylvania.
