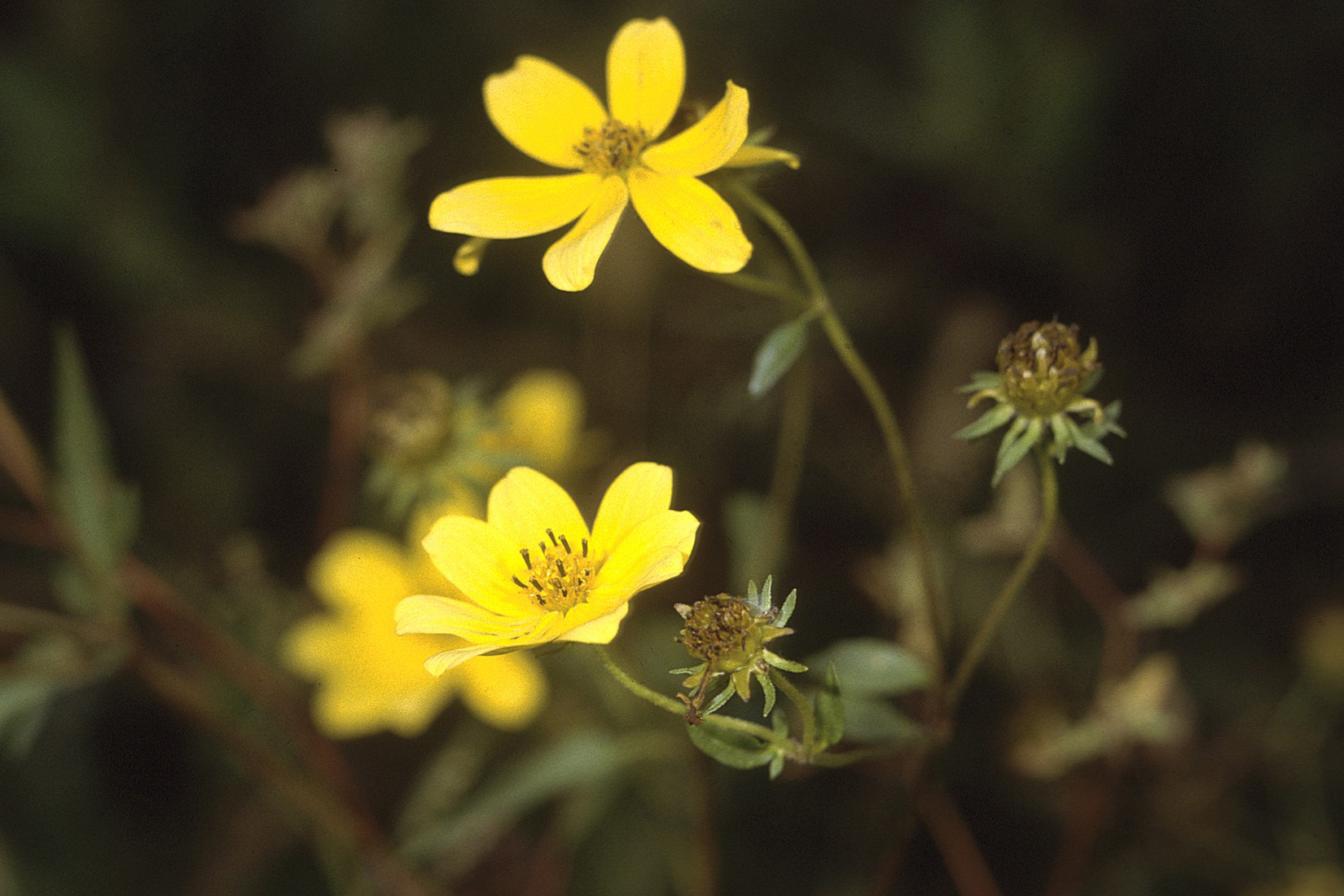

Conservation status
- Secure (NatureServe)

Scientific classification
- Kingdom: Plantae
- Clade: Tracheophytes
- Clade: Angiosperms
- Clade: Eudicots
- Clade: Asterids
- Order: Asterales
- Family: Asteraceae
- Genus: Bidens
- Species: B. aristosa

Binomial name
- Bidens aristosa (Michx.) Britt.

Synonyms
- Synonymy: Bidens aristosa var. fritcheyi Fernald; Bidens aristosa f. fritcheyi (Fernald) Wunderlin; Bidens aristosa var. mutica (A.Gray) Gatt. ex Fernald; Bidens aristosa f. mutica (A.Gray) Wunderlin; Bidens aristosa var. typica Sherff; Coreopsis aristata Willd.; Coreopsis aristota var. mutica A.Gray; Coreopsis aristosa Michx.; Diodonta aristosa (Michx.) Nutt.

= Bidens aristosa =

Species of flowering plant

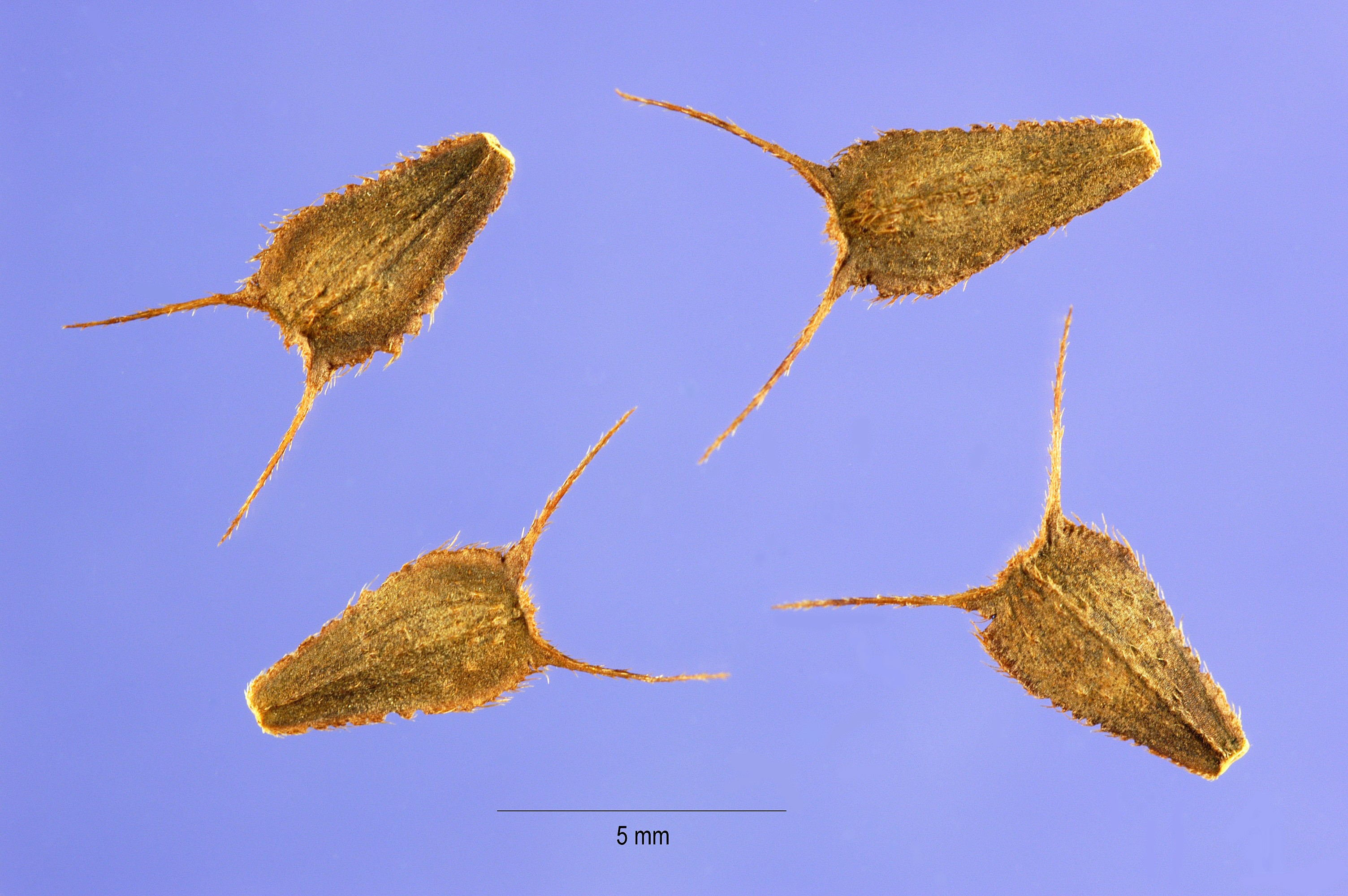
Bidens aristosa seeds

Bidens aristosa, known by many common names such as bearded beggarticks, western tickseed, showy tickseed, long-bracted beggarticks, tickseed beggarticks, swamp marigold, and Yankee lice, is an herbaceous, annual plant in the Asteraceae family. It is native to the central United States, but has been introduced to the eastern United States, Canada, France, Great Britain, and India. It grows in marshes, meadows, pine forests and disturbed sites.

== Description ==
Bidens aristosa is a herbaceous, annual flowering plant that typically grows between 1-2 ft tall, but can grow up to five feet tall. The leaves are attached to petioles 1 to 3 cm long. The leaf blades are lanceolate to lance-linear, and are laciniately pinnatisect. It has numerous yellow flower heads with 5-10 ray florets and 12-40 disc florets. Fruits are dry cypselae bearing barbs that get caught in fur or clothing, thus aiding in the plant's dispersal.

== Distribution and habitat ==
This species can be found from the United States (Alabama, Arkansas, District of Columbia, Illinois, Indiana, Kentucky, Louisiana, Maryland, Michigan, Minnesota, Missouri, New York, North Carolina, South Carolina, Tennessee, Texas, Virginia, Wisconsin), Canada (Ontario), France, Great Britain, and India.

The species is most likely native to the Central United States, but has been introduced into the Eastern United States, Central Canada, France, Great Britain, and India. The first sighting of Bidens aristosa in the eastern United States was by the Potomac River near Glen Echo, Maryland in 1902. The species is likely spread by the import of food crops or wool products.

=== Habitat ===
Bidens aristosa grows in marshes, meadows, pine forests and disturbed sites at elevations of 0 to 300 metres from sea level.

== Taxonomy ==
Bidens aristosa was first described by André Michaux under the name Coreopsis aristosa in 1803 in the publication Flora Boreali-Americana. In 1893, Nathaniel Lord Britton moved the species to the genus Bidens, while keeping the species epithet the same.

=== Etymology ===
In English, this species is known by many common names. Common names include, but are not limited to; bearded beggarticks, bur marigold, long-bracted beggarticks, swamp marigold, tickseed beggarticks, western tickseed, Yankee lice, midwestern beggarticks, and showy tickseed.
