= Beecher, Illinois =

Beecher
- Village
- Village of Beecher
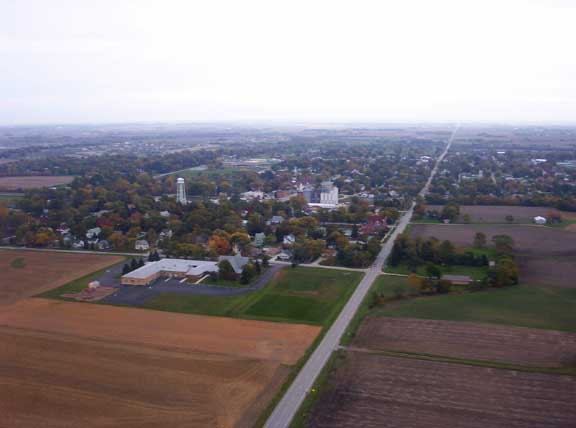
- Beecher, looking east

- Flag Logo

- Location of Beecher in Will County, Illinois.
- Coordinates: 41°20′56″N 87°37′25″W
- Country: United States
- State: Illinois
- County: Will
- Incorporated: 1884

Area
  - Total: 2.74 sq mi (7.09 km^{2})
  - Land: 2.74 sq mi (7.09 km^{2})
  - Water: 0 sq mi (0.00 km^{2})
- Elevation: 735 ft (224 m)

Population (2020)
  - Total: 4,713
  - Density: 1,721.4/sq mi (664.62/km^{2})
- Time zone: UTC-6 (CST)
  - Summer (DST): UTC-5 (CDT)
- ZIP code: 60401
- Area codes: 708/464
- FIPS code: 17-04585
- GNIS feature ID: 2398066
- Website: www.villageofbeecher.org

Beecher is a village in Will County, Illinois, United States. It is located on the old Chicago and Eastern Illinois Railroad and the Dixie Highway. Situated in the center of Washington Township, it was originally named Washington Center. Named for Henry Ward Beecher, Beecher was founded in 1870 and incorporated as a village in 1884. Originally governed by a village president and board of trustees, a village administrator was hired to handle daily tasks in 1988. The city clerk is an appointed position.

The population was 4,713 at the 2020 census.

== History ==
Early Days of Beecher T.L. Miller arrived in Washington Township in 1862 and began purchasing land. His plan was to begin breeding and raising Hereford cattle. He knew the area offered good grazing lands; and he was convinced that the Hereford breed of beef cattle showed great promise for the future. At the time, T.L. Miller lived in Chicago and was in the fire and insurance business. Mr. Miller was a great admirer of Henry Ward Beecher, the most famous orator of that time, and named the new village after him.

Mr. Miller purchased his first 320 acres of land from the government. Later he added another 400 acres. He began making improvements immediately on his property, which he called Highland Stock Farm. His son. T.E. (Timothy Elliott) Miller recalled: “On his beautiful farm, he established the finest and largest herd of Hereford cattle in America. To him is due the credit of the wide dissemination of this great breed of beef cattle in the United States. A man of great energy, his name was widely known in England and America in connection with the Hereford breed of cattle.”

To further promote Hereford cattle, he established the “Breeder’s Journal” in 1880 and published it for eight years. In addition, he gathered and assembled the pedigree of Hereford cattle in the first two volumes of the “Hereford Herd Book”. Both were published in Beecher.

The Railroad Sometime after his initial purchase of land, T. L. Miller learned that the Chicago, Danville and Vincennes Railroad was coming through the area. He was able to acquire an additional 340 acres west of his original property and adjoining the proposed railroad on both sides. He secured the promise of a railroad station within his property. Early in 1869, work began on the new railroad. It would run from Chicago, through Danville and eventually cross the Wabash River to Vincennes, crossing through the easternmost tier of Illinois counties. Sometime before October 1869, the track was laid through the future Village of Beecher. By January 1870, there was complete rail service to Chicago.

The railroad assured Beecher's future. Chicago was just 37 miles to the north by rail, and from there, connections could be made to any part of the country. Then in 1870, Mr. Miller asked George Dolton to lay out the future village, with a business section on both sides of the railroad, and beyond that, twelve blocks on each side for future development of homes and other businesses.

Beecher Depot

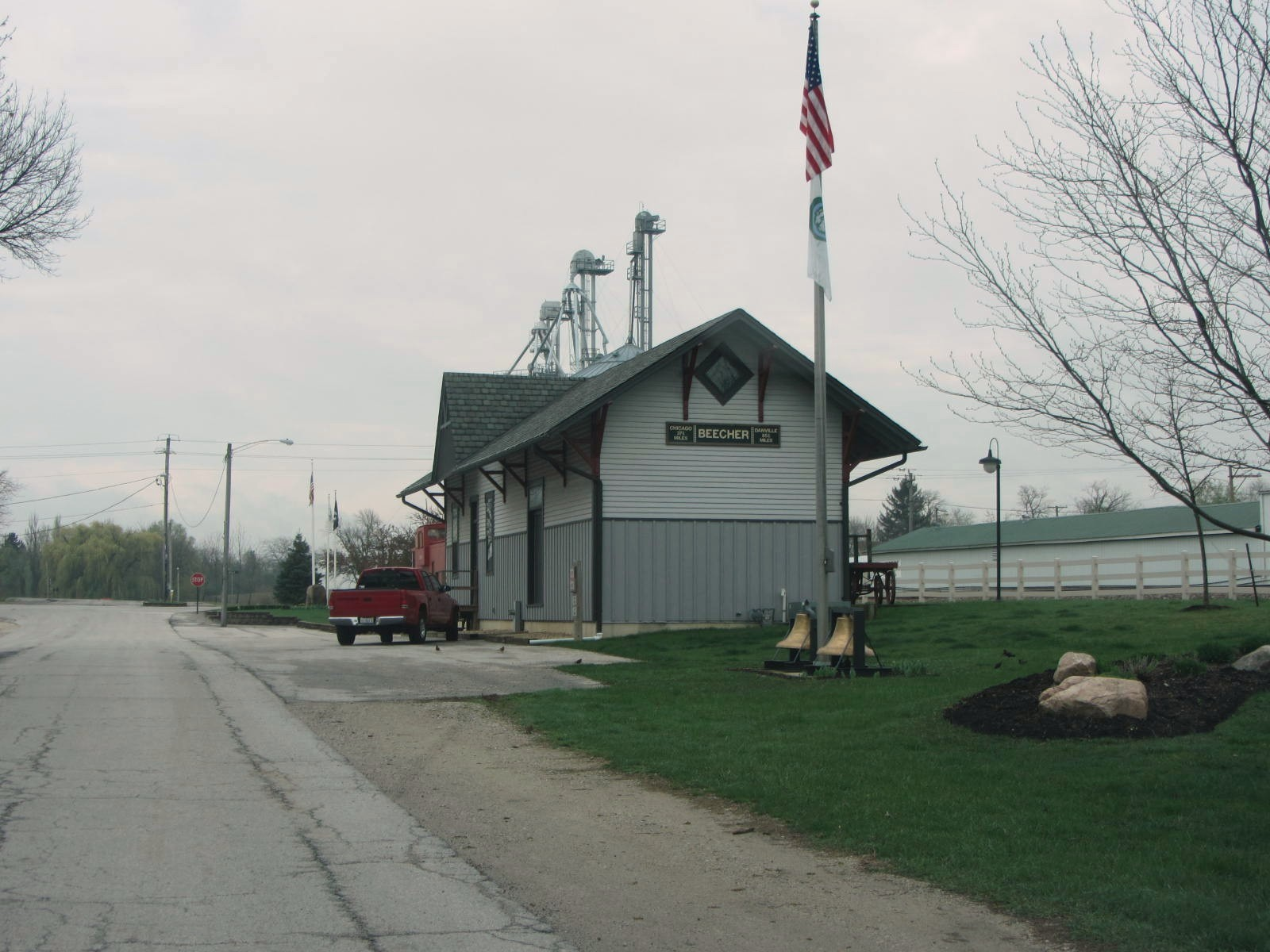
Beecher's now-defunct train depot

With efficient rail service running through the new village, further development began to build up near the railroad. By the end of the century, there was a thriving business section in the heart of the village. The depot became the center of activity. It was located on Reed Street, between Hodges and Penfield and was built in 1881 by the Chicago, Danville & Vincennes (CD&V) RR. The Chicago & Eastern Illinois (C&EI) RR took it over and operated it until the 1960s when it closed. The depot was sold and moved to Monee, Illinois to Thompson's Winery where it was used as a gift shop until the 1980s. It was returned to its original site in Beecher in 2000, and renovated to its present state. It is a standard wooden depot and one of the last of its kind left on the former C&EI route. It is the home of the local historical society and is open on Saturdays from 9 a.m. until noon.

== Geography ==
According to the 2010 census, Beecher has a total area of 2.96 square miles (7.67 km^{2}), all land. The majority of the village is in Section 16 of Washington Township.

A branch of Trim Creek flows through Beecher, but this carries very little water most of the year.

Beecher is located in the center of a primarily agricultural township. Beecher Community Unit School District 200U provides educational services for Washington Township and 12 square miles (31 km^{2}) of the neighboring, entirely rural, Will Township.

The nearest towns are Crete, Illinois, 7 miles (11 km) north; Grant Park, 7 miles (11 km) south; Peotone, 9 miles (14 km) west and Cedar Lake, Indiana, 10 miles (16 km) east.

Nearby communities

== Demographics ==
Historical population
Census	Pop.	Note	%±
1890	342		—
1900	410		19.9%
1910	543		32.4%
1920	609		12.2%
1930	772		26.8%
1940	742		−3.9%
1950	956		28.8%
1960	1,367		43.0%
1970	1,770		29.5%
1980	2,024		14.4%
1990	2,032		0.4%
2000	2,033		0.0%
2010	4,359		114.4%
2020	4,713		8.1%
2022 (est.)	4,674	▼	−0.8%
U.S. Decennial Census

=== Racial and ethnic composition ===
Beecher village, Illinois – Racial and ethnic composition Note: the US Census treats Hispanic/Latino as an ethnic category. This table excludes Latinos from the racial categories and assigns them to a separate category. Hispanics/Latinos may be of any race.
Race / Ethnicity (NH = Non-Hispanic)	Pop 2000	Pop 2010	Pop 2020	% 2000	% 2010	% 2020
White alone (NH)	1,969	3,892	3,914	96.85%	89.29%	83.05%
Black or African American alone (NH)	0	128	174	0.00%	2.94%	3.69%
Native American or Alaska Native alone (NH)	1	1	5	0.05%	0.02%	0.11%
Asian alone (NH)	9	19	45	0.44%	0.44%	0.95%
Native Hawaiian or Pacific Islander alone (NH)	0	0	0	0.00%	0.00%	0.00%
Other race alone (NH)	0	3	6	0.00%	0.07%	0.13%
Mixed race or Multiracial (NH)	18	42	129	0.89%	0.96%	2.74%
Hispanic or Latino (any race)	36	274	440	1.77%	6.29%	9.34%
Total	2,033	4,359	4,713	100.00%	100.00%	100.00%

=== 2020 census ===
As of the 2020 census, Beecher had a population of 4,713. The median age was 41.3 years. 23.9% of residents were under the age of 18 and 18.9% of residents were 65 years of age or older. For every 100 females there were 91.4 males, and for every 100 females age 18 and over there were 89.4 males age 18 and over.

0.0% of residents lived in urban areas, while 100.0% lived in rural areas.

There were 1,699 households in Beecher, of which 35.7% had children under the age of 18 living in them. Of all households, 57.4% were married-couple households, 13.4% were households with a male householder and no spouse or partner present, and 23.5% were households with a female householder and no spouse or partner present. About 21.7% of all households were made up of individuals and 11.6% had someone living alone who was 65 years of age or older.

There were 1,768 housing units, of which 3.9% were vacant. The homeowner vacancy rate was 0.4% and the rental vacancy rate was 9.9%.

=== 2000 census ===
As of the census of 2000, there were 2,033 people, 830 households, and 590 families residing in the village. The population density was 964.4 inhabitants per square mile (372.4/km^{2}). There were 876 housing units at an average density of 415.6 per square mile (160.5/km^{2}). The racial makeup of the village was 98.03% White, 0.15% Native American, 0.44% Asian, 0.34% from other races, and 1.03% from two or more races. Hispanic or Latino of any race were 1.77% of the population and 0.00% African American.

There were 830 households, out of which 29.4% had children under the age of 18 living with them, 59.4% were married couples living together, 8.6% had a female householder with no husband present, and 28.9% were non-families. 26.4% of all households were made up of individuals, and 13.1% had someone living alone who was 65 years of age or older. The average household size was 2.45 and the average family size was 2.96.

In the village, the population was spread out, with 22.8% under the age of 18, 7.1% from 18 to 24, 25.0% from 25 to 44, 27.0% from 45 to 64, and 18.2% who were 65 years of age or older. The median age was 42 years. For every 100 females, there were 91.4 males. For every 100 females age 18 and over, there were 91.2 males.

The median income for a household in the village was $51,250, and the median income for a family was $60,625. Males had a median income of $43,563 versus $26,786 for females. The per capita income for the village was $23,454. About 3.0% of families and 4.0% of the population were below the poverty line, including 4.2% of those under age 18 and 9.0% of those age 65 or over.

== Parks ==
Being a small community, Beecher does not have an official park district. Instead, the village's Public Works Department manages Beecher's park lands.

Beecher residents have ten parks within the village's borders to utilize. Via these parks, Beecher offers its citizens access to jogging paths, soccer fields, picnic areas, playgrounds, and baseball fields. Ten-acre Welton Stedt Park is the largest park in the village. Located adjacent to Beecher Junior High School, Welton Stedt Park boasts four ballfields, a pond, and portable toilets. Firemen's Park, situated in the heart of Beecher, has picnic pavilions, a snack shack, a stage, bathroom facilities, ballfields, walking paths, and a seasonal ice rink. Beecher's annual Fourth of July Festival has been held in Firemen's Park for decades.

"Ribbon of Hope” Cancer Awareness Garden

The Ribbon of Hope Commission was established by the Beecher Village Board in 2013 with the goal of creating a small garden that would promote cancer awareness. A small plot of land in Fireman's Park was selected as the site of the garden, and on May 20, 2018, the garden's centerpiece, a metallic sculpture in the form of a ribbon, was dedicated.

== Education ==
=== Public schools ===
- Beecher High School
- Beecher Junior High School
- Beecher Elementary School

=== Private schools ===
- Zion Lutheran Grade School (closed) - 540 Oak Park Ave, Beecher

== Notable people ==
- Rube Ehrhardt, pitcher for the Brooklyn Robins, Cincinnati Reds
- Milt Pappas, pitcher for Chicago Cubs, Atlanta Braves, Cincinnati Reds, Baltimore Orioles
