= Lake Renwick Preserve =

Country forest preserve in Illinois, USA

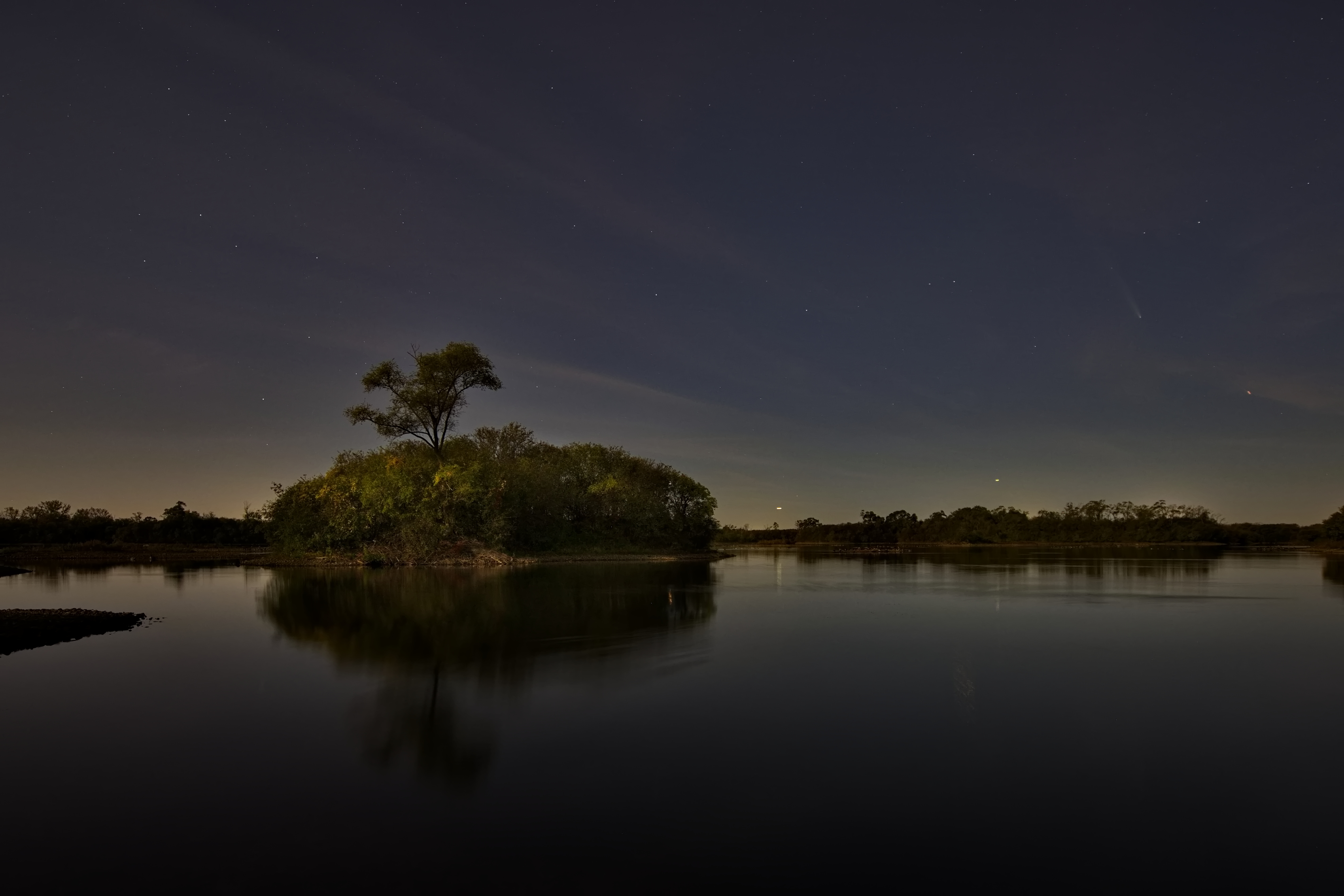
- Night view of Lake Renwick
- Interactive map of Lake Renwick Preserve
- Location: Will County, Illinois
- Nearest city: Plainfield, Illinois
- Coordinates: 41°35′59″N 88°11′8″W
- Area: 836 acres (338 ha)
- Established: 1992
- Operator: Forest Preserve District of Will County

The Lake Renwick Preserve is an 836-acre (3.38 km^{2}) county forest preserve located in Will County, Illinois. It is the second largest county government owned nature preserve in Will County. The closest major town is Plainfield, Illinois. It is best known as a nesting location for herons and other wading birds.

== Features ==
Lake Renwick is an artificial lake created through the adaptive reuse of a network of former quarries from which aggregates were mined for concrete used by the Chicago metropolitan area. After the quarries were closed in 1983, the areas of below-water-table elevation filled with water, and the resulting lakes were sold to the county forest preserve district and the Illinois Department of Natural Resources in 1990 for use as open space.

Lake Renwick, because of its location, depth, and the fertility of its fishery, is especially adapted to serve as a breeding location for wading birds. Unlike many Illinois lakes, this body of water has a gravel bottom, not mud. According to the Illinois Audubon Society, the heron rookery located within the lake is "by far the most valuable rookery in all of Illinois ... a site of outstanding statewide significance."

Bird lovers have constructed a series of artificial nesting structures on a network of small islets within one of the lakes. The lake complex draws great blue herons, great egrets, black-crowned night herons, double-crested cormorants, and cattle egrets.

== The park today ==
Lake Renwick Preserve is located southeast of Plainfield, Illinois, on U.S. Highway 30. Unsupervised visitation by the public to most of the preserve is banned from March until mid-August to prevent disturbance to nesting birds. The public is welcomed to a dedicated birdwatching area, the Copley Nature Park, year around, and is welcomed to the entire preserve from mid-August until the end of February.

During the non-nesting months, the public often uses a 2.9-mile (4.6 km) system of trailways throughout the preserve area, the Lake Renwick Bikeway. The Bikeway reuses a system of railroad spur-line-rights of ways, lake isthmuses, and truck paths once used to remove and haul out the aggregates quarried from the lake basins. The Bikeway provides access to various spots used for bank fishing.

During the nesting months, those interested in supervised birdwatching are urged to make prior arrangements with the Forest Preserve District and its guides. Nesting activities are described as reaching their peak in June, as the wading birds teach their young how to catch fish.

A 320-acre (1.3 km^{2}) parcel of the Lake Renwick Preserve, comprising most of Lake Renwick itself, was listed in 1992 as an official nature preserve of the state of Illinois.
