= Peotone Township, Illinois =

Coordinates: 41°20′24″N 87°50′21″W

Peotone Township
- Township
- Location in Will County
- Country: United States
- State: Illinois
- County: Will
- Established: 1855

Area
  - Township: 36.32 sq mi (94.1 km^{2})
  - Land: 36.26 sq mi (93.9 km^{2})
  - Water: 0.06 sq mi (0.16 km^{2}) 0.17%
  - Urban: 2.5 sq mi (6.5 km^{2})
  - Metro: 0.0 sq mi (0 km^{2})
- Elevation: 253 ft (77 m)

Population (2010)
  - Estimate (2016): 4,407
  - Density: 122.2/sq mi (47.2/km^{2})
  - Urban: 2,977
  - Metro: 0.0
  - Metro density: 0/sq mi (0/km^{2})
- More subdivisions are being built.
- Time zone: UTC−6 (CST)
  - Summer (DST): UTC−5 (CDT)
- FIPS code: 17-197-59065
- Website: peotonetownship.org

Peotone Township is located in Will County, Illinois. As of the 2010 census, its population was 4,431 and it contained 1,728 housing units. The township was formed from the eastern half of Wilton Township at an unknown date. It contains the village of Peotone and the unincorporated community of Andres. Interstate 57, Route 50, Route 45, and Route 52 are major routes.

== Geography ==
According to the 2010 census, the township has a total area of 36.32 square miles (94.1 km^{2}), of which 36.26 square miles (93.9 km^{2}) (or 99.83%) is land and 0.06 square miles (0.16 km^{2}) (or 0.17%) is water. A description of the township appears at the bottom of the 1873 plat atlas and it reads "...This is an entirely prairie township which a rich, fertile soil, and for agricultural purposes and grain raising is second, perhaps, to none in the county." The land of Peotone Township is very gently rolling and becomes even flatter as you move south in the township. The major waterways in Peotone township include the South Branch Forked Creek, Rock Creek, and Black Creek. Other water includes the Peotone Park District.

== Demographics ==
Historical population
Census	Pop.	Note	%±
2016 (est.)	4,407
U.S. Decennial Census

== Infrastructure ==
In the 1960s Interstate 57 was built and it passes through the east half of Peotone Township. An exit and entrance ramp off the interstate serves as a main entrance to the town of Peotone. While I-57 borders Peotone's west village limits, Route 50 passes through the east side of town. Many of Peotone's businesses are located on along Route 50. Running parallel to Route 50 for much of its path through Peotone Township is the Canadian National Railway. The village of Peotone sprung up alongside this railroad in 1856. The railroad is what brought early settlers to the township. Another main route that passes through Peotone Township is Route 45. Running 1-mile (1.6 km) east of the townships west boundary is the two-lane highway. The Peotone Township stretch of Route 45 was completely resurfaced during the summer of 2008, following a winter full of angry motorists complaining about the serious pothole condition of the highway, which had gotten to be a public safety hazard.

== Events ==
Peotone is known county-wide for the Will County Fair the town has hosted for more than 100 years. At the northwest corner of Peotone-Wilmington Road and West Street, the Will County Fairgrounds provides a place to meet up with friends and family and say goodbye to summer every August.
