= Beecher Community Unit School District 200U =

School district in Illinois, United States

Location
- Beecher, Illinois, 60401; United States

District information
- Type: Public
- Grades: PreK–12
- NCES District ID: 1705430

Students and staff
- Students: 1,080

Other information
- Website: beecher200u.org

Beecher Community Unit School District 200U is a unit school district in the south suburbs of Chicago, Illinois, USA.

As of 2015, the school district had 1046 students and 62 full-time equivalent teacher employment, for a teacher-student ratio of 21:1, and operational expenses were $12,521 per student.

- Beecher Elementary School
- Beecher Junior High School
- Beecher High School
