= Monee, Illinois =

Monee
- Village
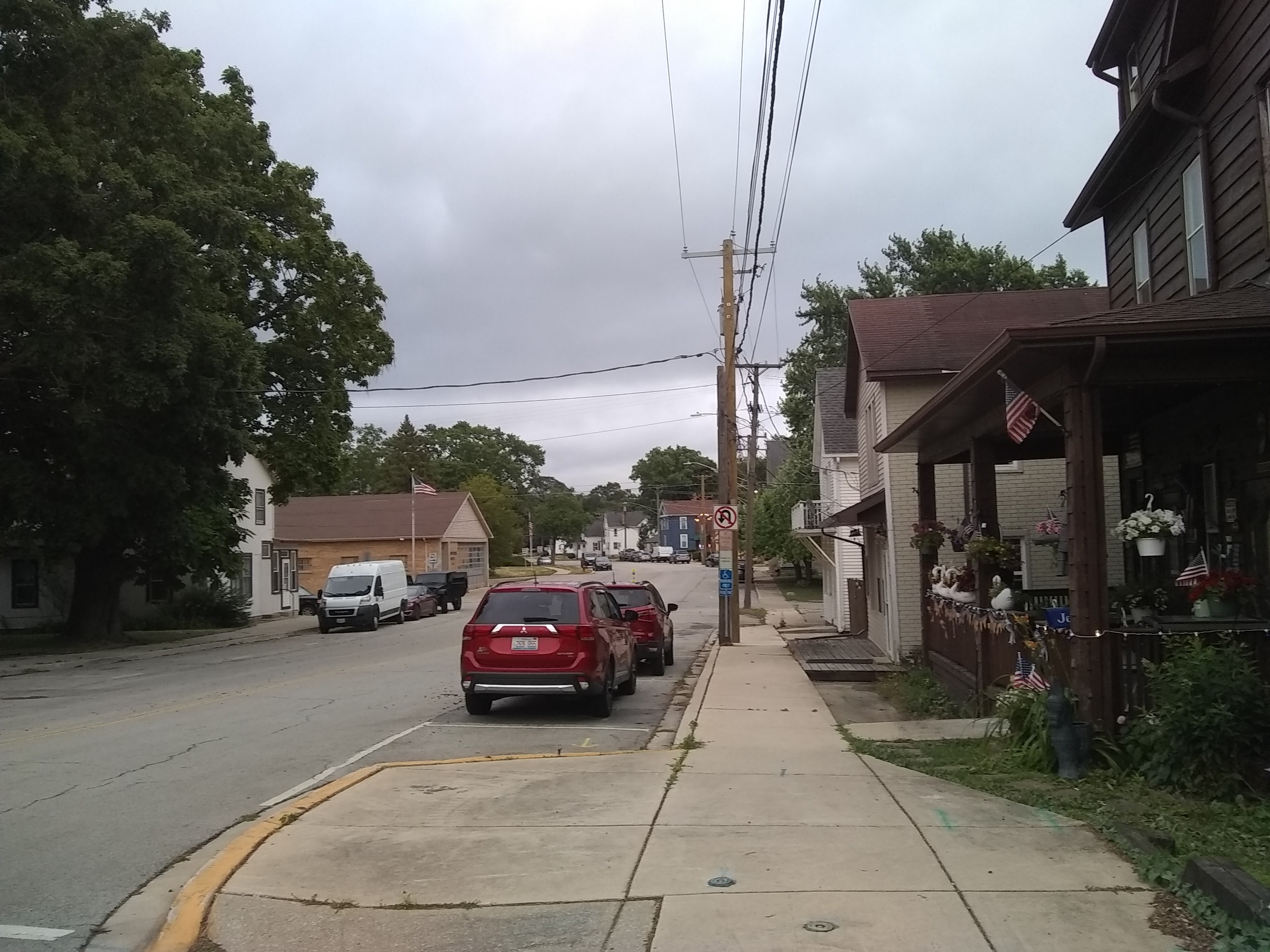
- Main Street

- Location of Monee in Will County, Illinois.

- Location of Illinois in the United States
- Coordinates: 41°25′8″N 87°44′45″W
- Country: United States
- State: Illinois
- County: Will
- Township: Monee

Area
  - Total: 4.47 sq mi (11.59 km^{2})
  - Land: 4.47 sq mi (11.59 km^{2})
  - Water: 0 sq mi (0.00 km^{2})

Population (2020)
  - Total: 5,128
  - Density: 1,146.4/sq mi (442.64/km^{2})
- Time zone: UTC-6 (CST)
  - Summer (DST): UTC-5 (CDT)
- ZIP Code(s): 60449
- Area code: 708
- FIPS code: 17-49945
- Wikimedia Commons: Monee, Illinois
- Website: villageofmonee.org

Monee is a village in Will County, Illinois, United States, It is a south suburb of Chicago. The population was 5,128 at the 2020 census.

== History ==
The village is named for Marie LeFevre Bailly, the wife of fur trader Joseph Bailly, "Monee" being an indigenous-accented pronunciation of "Marie."

Monee was "on the north edge" of the Cyclone of 1917, which damaged trees and structures. Monee's lumberyard supplied materials to rebuild the 67 structures in neighboring Green Garden and Monee Township.

== Geography ==
According to the 2020 census, Monee has a total area of 4.47 square miles (11.58 km^{2}), all land.

== Demographics ==
Historical population
Census	Pop.	Note	%±
1870	598		—
1880	503		−15.9%
1890	445		−11.5%
1900	462		3.8%
1910	411		−11.0%
1920	395		−3.9%
1930	383		−3.0%
1940	427		11.5%
1950	554		29.7%
1960	646		16.6%
1970	940		45.5%
1980	993		5.6%
1990	1,044		5.1%
2000	2,924		180.1%
2010	5,148		76.1%
2020	5,128		−0.4%
U.S. Decennial Census

=== Racial and ethnic composition ===
Monee village, Illinois – Racial and ethnic composition Note: the US Census treats Hispanic/Latino as an ethnic category. This table excludes Latinos from the racial categories and assigns them to a separate category. Hispanics/Latinos may be of any race.
Race / Ethnicity (NH = Non-Hispanic)	Pop 2000	Pop 2010	Pop 2020	% 2000	% 2010	% 2020
White alone (NH)	2,684	3,735	2,928	91.79%	72.55%	57.10%
Black or African American alone (NH)	62	743	1,350	2.12%	14.43%	26.33%
Native American or Alaska Native alone (NH)	2	2	8	0.07%	0.04%	0.16%
Asian alone (NH)	13	119	118	0.44%	2.31%	2.30%
Native Hawaiian or Pacific Islander alone (NH)	0	1	1	0.00%	0.02%	0.02%
Other race alone (NH)	5	1	13	0.17%	0.02%	0.25%
Mixed race or Multiracial (NH)	40	83	171	1.37%	1.61%	3.33%
Hispanic or Latino (any race)	118	464	539	4.04%	9.01%	10.51%
Total	2,924	5,148	5,128	100.00%	100.00%	100.00%

=== 2020 census ===
As of the 2020 census, Monee had a population of 5,128. The median age was 42.8 years. 20.8% of residents were under the age of 18 and 18.0% of residents were 65 years of age or older. For every 100 females, there were 93.4 males, and for every 100 females age 18 and over, there were 91.0 males age 18 and over.

95.5% of residents lived in urban areas, while 4.5% lived in rural areas.

There were 2,001 households in Monee, of which 28.4% had children under the age of 18 living in them. Of all households, 50.5% were married-couple households, 16.7% were households with a male householder and no spouse or partner present, and 25.9% were households with a female householder and no spouse or partner present. About 25.4% of all households were made up of individuals, and 12.4% had someone living alone who was 65 years of age or older.

There were 2,127 housing units, of which 5.9% were vacant. The homeowner vacancy rate was 2.7% and the rental vacancy rate was 6.8%.

=== 2000 census ===
As of the 2000 census, there were 2,939 people, 1,204 households, and 872 families residing in the village. The population density was 243.3 inhabitants per square mile (93.9/km^{2}). There were 21,271 housing units at an average density of 410.0 per square mile (158.3/km^{2}). The racial makeup of the village was 93.88% White, 2.12% African American, 0.07% Native American, 0.44% Asian, 1.88% from other races, and 1.61% from two or more races. Hispanic or Latino of any race were 4.04% of the population.

There were 1,204 households, out of which 26.5% had children under the age of 18 living with them, 63.4% were married couples living together, 6.3% had a female householder with no husband present, and 27.5% were non-families. 21.9% of all households were made up of individuals, and 8.7% had someone living alone who was 65 years of age or older. The average household size was 2.43 and the average family size was 2.83.

In the village, the population was spread out, with 21.5% under the age of 18, 6.2% from 18 to 24, 34.6% from 25 to 44, 22.1% from 45 to 64, and 15.6% who were 65 years of age or older. The median age was 37 years. For every 100 females, there were 101.4 males. For every 100 females age 18 and over, there were 99.7 males.

The median income for a household in the village was $58,625, and the median income for a family was $64,960. Males had a median income of $46,604 versus $33,750 for females. The per capita income for the village was $27,687. About 2.7% of families and 3.4% of the population were below the poverty line, including 3.9% of those under age 18 and 4.7% of those age 65 or over.

== Education ==
The village of Monee falls within the Crete-Monee Community Unit School District 201-U. Monee Elementary is located in the village.

== Transportation ==
=== Roads ===
- Interstate 57
- Illinois Route 50

=== Rail ===
The Canadian National Railway (former Illinois Central Railroad) line runs through Monee along a 25-foot-deep (7.6 m) and 83-foot-wide (25 m) open cut known locally as "the cut". Despite the width of the cutting, the section has one track.

A train depot in Monee, alongside the connecting rail line, opened in 1853, contributing to the initial growth of Monee's population and development. In 1886, the line was double tracked to Kankakee to keep up with increasing railroad traffic. Up until the early 1920s, the line crossed many cross streets at street level. Because Monee is at a higher elevation than in any other community north of Carbondale, it was difficult for steam trains to travel uphill toward the village. Consequently, the Illinois Central dug a trench in Monee between 1922 and 1923 to move the rail line and the station below ground. When the trench became operational, the rail line had three tracks south of Monee and four tracks north.

Although the move eliminated railroad crossings in the village, the cut disrupted adjacent businesses. Coupled with the decline of passenger rail through the 20th century, the depot was closed sometime in the mid-20th century. Today, the depot was demolished, and only one track remains through the village.

== Notable people ==
- Tony Zych, Major League Baseball pitcher for New York Yankees
