= Knoll Spring site =

Archaeological site in Illinois, United States

Knoll Spring Site

- Location in Illinois Location in United States
- 41°45′00″N 87°42′00″W
- Location: in the Sag Valley, Palos Hills, in Cook County near Chicago, Illinois

The Knoll Spring site (11Ck-19), aka Au Sagaunashke village, is located in the Sag Valley, Palos Hills, in Cook County, Illinois, near the city of Chicago. It is classified as a late prehistoric site with Upper Mississippian Huber affiliation.

== History of archaeological investigations ==
Surface collections took place from 1964 through 1967. Excavations took place in 1966 and results were published in 1971.

== Results of data analysis ==
Excavations at the site yielded prehistoric artifacts, pit features, burials, plant remains and animal bone (analysis of the animal bone was not included in the site report).

=== Features ===
A total of 33 features were identified at the site, of which 32 were of Upper Mississippian affiliation. Some of the feature were classified as fire pits, and the remainder were classified as refuse pits. Feature 26 was noted as a deep roasting pit similar to those found at the Zimmerman site in Illinois. Similar deep roasting pits have been found at the Griesmer site in northwestern Indiana, and the Moccasin Bluff, Schwerdt and Elam sites in southwest Michigan. No plant remains were located at Knoll Spring, but at Griesmer the carbonized remains of white water lily (Nymphaea tuberosa) tubers were recovered and at Schwert and Elam, the carbonized remains of American Lotus tubers were recovered from similar roasting pits.

A few post molds were noted, but their presence was random and the excavators could not detect the outline of a house pattern.

=== Burials ===
Two burials were present, and grave goods were included in each. Burial 1 had a stone graver, and Burial 2 was interred with a copper ornament.

=== Plant remains ===
The carbonized remains of cultivated plants were recovered at Knoll Spring. Features 8 and 14 each yielded 7 kernels of Eastern 8-row maize, and Features 11 and 14 together yielded 3 fragments of the common bean, indicating agriculture took place at the site. In addition, 13 fragments of hickory nut shell and 2 fragments of black walnut shell were recovered, as well as two seed of Carex sp.

=== Artifacts ===
Artifacts recovered from the site included:

- Pottery – total of over 1,120 sherds, of which 1,015 were assigned to the Au Sagaunashke component (aka Huber or Blue Island). The pottery artifacts will be discussed in more detail below.
- Chipped stone artifacts – including projectile points, scrapers, gravers, knives and punches/awls. Of the projectile points, the most numerous category was the small triangular Madison point.
- Ground stone artifacts – including a hammerstone, a ground stone ball, a metate and pitted anvils.
- Shell artifacts – several fragments of marine shell were present, including one that was possibly used as a spoon.
- Bone and antler artifacts – scapula hoes, antler flakers, a hoe formed from a mammal pelvis, a piece of worked antler that may have been used as a scraper, and rib bones incised with designs that may have had ceremonial purpose.
- Metal artifacts – included a musket ball, brass strip, copper tube, iron projectile point, and 5 other metal artifacts thought by the researchers to be early European trade goods. However, when the site was first excavated, there was limited archaeological knowledge of the details of early artifacts from the period of first European contact (c. 1600-1750). Subsequent investigators have determined these objects were intrusive from later time periods.
- Clay pipe fragment – this was the only pipe fragment found at the site. The interior of the bowl is conical and was stained from smoking. It was decorated with incised lines.

=== Upper Mississippian Au Sagaunashke component (aka Huber or Blue Island) pottery ===
Pottery from the Au Sagaunashke component

Reconstructed Upper Mississippian vessel from the Au Sagaunashke component

Archaeologists often find pottery to be a very useful tool in analyzing a prehistoric culture. It is usually very plentiful at a site and the details of manufacture and decoration are very sensitive indicators of time, space, and culture.

Huber pottery is characterized by shell-tempered, smooth surface pottery with globular vessel shape and restricted orifices with everted rims. Some vessels also have strap handles. Decoration (when present) usually consists of vertical or obliquely applied incised lines generally running from the lip to the shoulder. A minority also have punctate decoration, mostly in combination with the trailed lines. Rarely, surfaces are cordmarked or smoothed over cordmarking. The top of the lip is either plain or decorated with fine to wide notching.

Of the Au Sagaunashke component pottery: 18% of the sherds had cordmarked surfaces; fine-to-medium incised line decoration was present on some sherds; 84% of the lips were notched, with wide-notching being the most common. Some of the rims were sharply everted but most were slightly everted.

=== Chronology of Au Sagaunashke component pottery within the Huber sequence ===
The trends in certain pottery traits are very time-sensitive and can be used as indicators of relative age. Based on information on other Huber sites in the area, archaeologists have determined early Huber pottery is more likely to have cordmarked surface finish; wide-trailed decoration; and notched lips. Late Huber pottery has predominately smooth surface finish; fine-line incised decoration; and unnotched lips. A minority also have punctate decoration, mostly in combination with the trailed lines.

In the Au Sagaunashke component assemblage, 18% of sherds are cordmarked, compared to only 1% at Huber and 23.5% at Hoxie Farm. Fine-line decoration is present on almost all of the Au Sagaunashke Component decorated sherds; the percentage of fine-line incised sherds is 13% at Hoxie Farm and 45% at Huber. Only 16% of the Au Sagaunashke Component lips are unnotched, compared to 49% at Huber and 20% at Hoxie Farm.

This combination of traits indicates that the Au Sagaunashke Component is intermediate in time between the Hoxie Farm and Huber sites, with Hoxie Farm coming first, Au Sagaunashke Component second and Huber last. The only exception to this would be with respect to the fine-line incising, which is a very late trait. The reason for this may be bias due to the smaller sample size; the Au Sagaunashke Component was composed of only 1,015 sherds compared with 6,077 sherds from Huber and over 12,000 sherds from Hoxie Farm.

== Significance ==
The Knoll Spring site assemblage resembles that of other Huber (Blue Island) sites in the Chicago Area, including Huber, Hoxie Farm, Oak Forest, Palos and Anker. This cultural group was one of the Native American tribes first encountered by European explorers and fur traders in the 1600s, based on the presence of European trade goods at Oak Forest and Palos, but the specific tribal affiliation is unknown. The initial researchers at Knoll Spring believed they had established an association of Huber pottery with early European trade goods, but subsequent investigators have determined these objects were probably intrusive, later period artifacts.
