= Sauk Lake =

- Sauk Trail Lake
- Location within Illinois Location within the United States
- Location: Cook County, Illinois, United States
- Coordinates: 41°29′14″N 87°39′20″W
- Type: Reservoir
- Basin countries: United States
- Surface elevation: 673 ft (205 m)

Sauk Lake (also known as Sauk Trail Lake) is a small, freshwater lake located in Cook County, Illinois, between the municipalities of Park Forest, Illinois and Chicago Heights, Illinois. It is an enlarged portion of Thorn Creek created by a dam on the south side of 26th Street, which borders the lake to the north. It is surrounded by steep, sandy bluffs on the east and west sides. It lies within the Sauk Trail Woods Forest Preserve.

Fish in this lake include yellow and black bullhead, bluegill, crappie, largemouth bass, channel catfish and common carp. Ice fishing is not allowed on the lake.

== See also ==
- Cook County Forest Preserves
