= North Creek Woods =

Forest preserve in Lansing, Illinois, US

Coordinates: 41°32′38″N 87°33′43″W

The North Creek Woods or North Creek Meadow is located within the Cook County Forest Preserves in Lansing, Illinois. The woods are connected to the other forest preserves of the Thorn Creek Trailsystem. They are named after North Creek, a tributary of Thorn Creek that runs through the woods. They contain many miles of paved bike trails and off-trail dirt hiking paths. They are a popular place for runners, cyclists, and walkers during the warm and cold times of the year. North Creek Woods contains both dense forest and prairie shrubland. The bicycle trails go through both. There is also a pavilion located at the main parking lot on Glenwood-Lansing Road. The woods are mostly flat.

== See also ==
- Cook County Forest Preserves
- Ned Brown Forest Preserve
- Sauk Trail Woods
