= Weber Spur Trail =

Proposed rail trail in Chicago

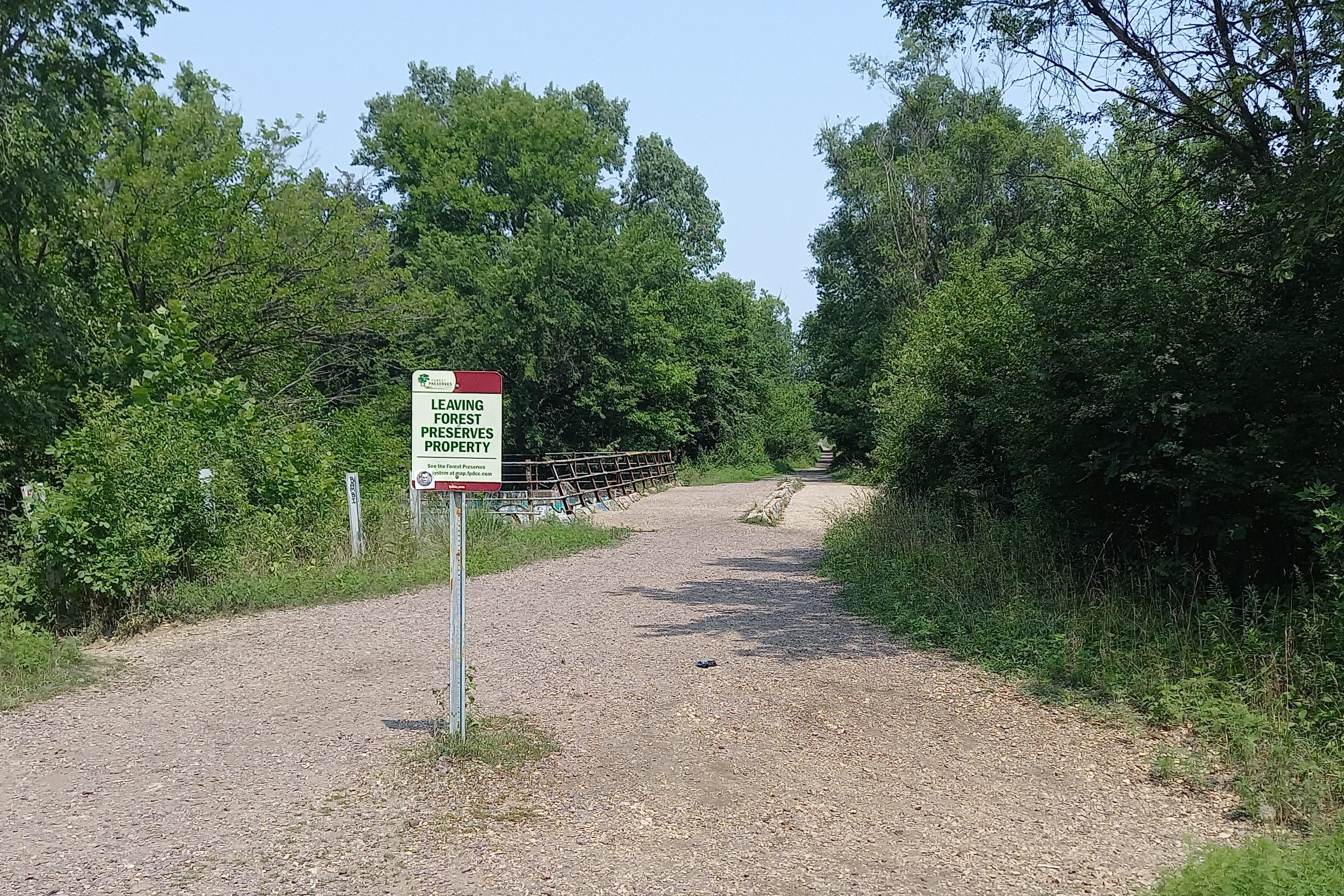
- Weber Spur Trail right of way at the North Branch Trail
- Location: Chicago, Illinois
- Trailheads: North Branch Trail; Devon Avenue

The Weber Spur Trail is a proposed Rails to Trails project aiming to create a multi-use trail on the far north side of Chicago. The trail started as a subsidiary railway line created by the Chicago And North Western Railway company known as the Weber Subdivision. If the City of Chicago is successful in negotiating with Union Pacific Railroad for the right-of-way needed for the trail, then the Weber Spur Trail would connect the North Branch Trail to the Union Pacific Recreation Path in Lincolnwood, Illinois. One of the proposals for the route is from N. Elston Ave to W Devon Ave.

== Location ==
- Southwest terminus on North Elston near Kimberly (41°58′18″N 87°44′45″W)
- Northeast terminus on West Devon near Springfield (41°59′50″N 87°43′35″W)
