= Skokie Lagoons =

Lake in Cook County, Illinois

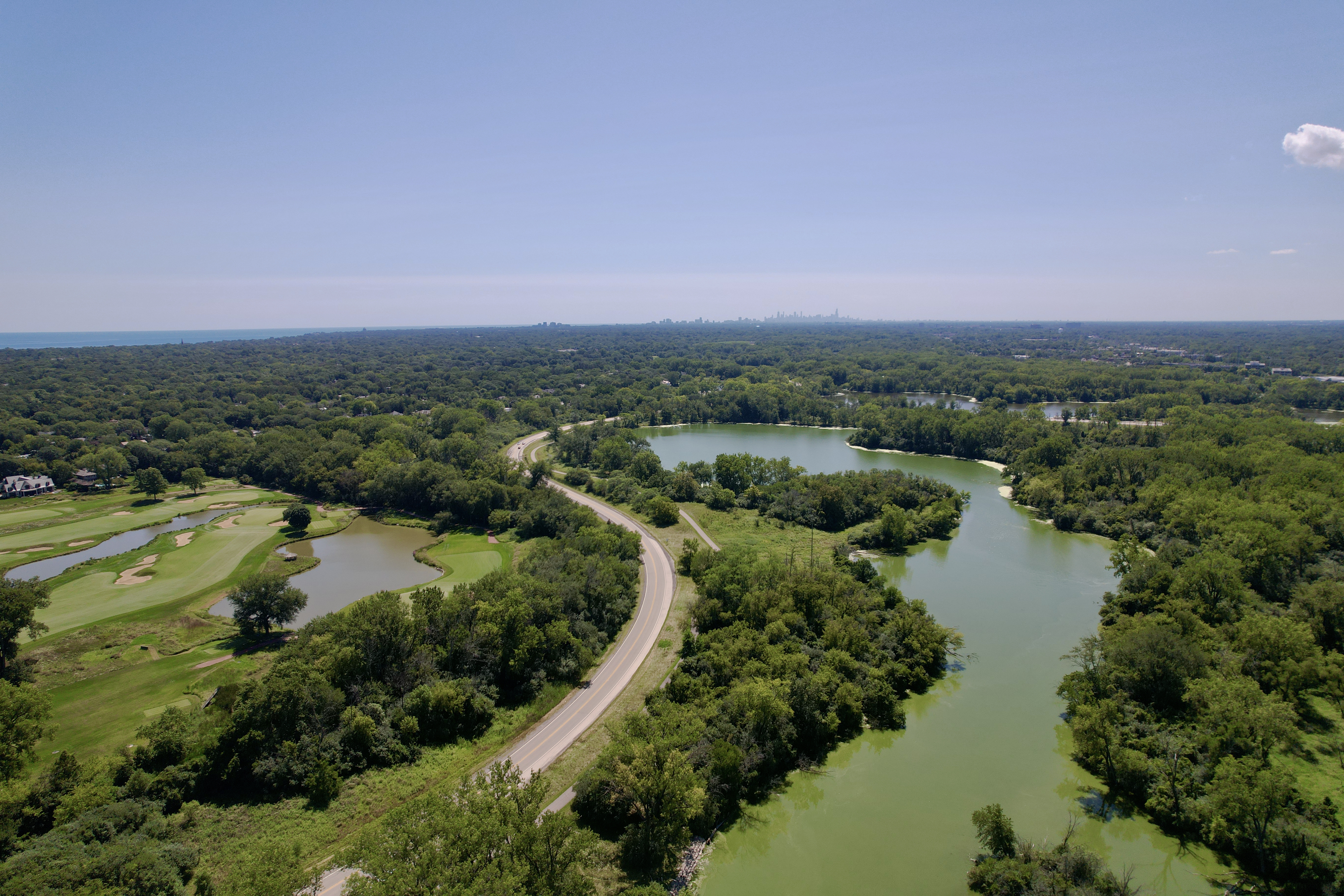
- Skokie Lagoons looking S SW towards Chicago from Drone

- Location within Illinois Location within the United States
- Location: Cook County, Illinois
- Coordinates: 42°06′06″N 87°45′33″W
- Type: Reservoir
- Basin countries: United States
- Surface elevation: 620 feet (190 m)
- Settlements: Glencoe, Winnetka

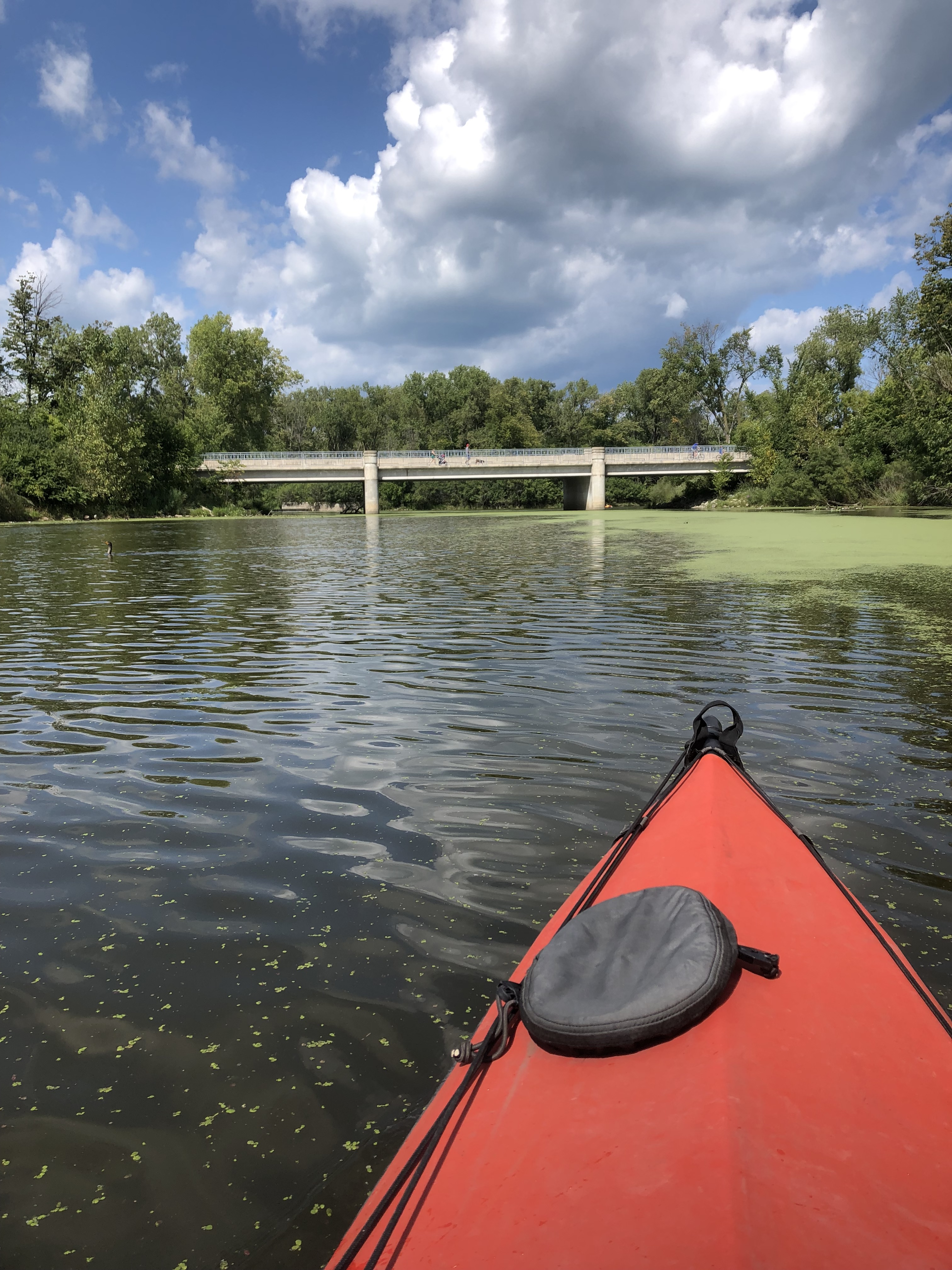
North view of Tower Road Bridge from boat launch.

Skokie Lagoons is a nature preserve in Glencoe and Winnetka, Illinois, owned and managed by the Forest Preserve District of Cook County. The park is bordered by Dundee Road to the north, Forestway Drive to the east, Willow Road to the south, and the Edens Expressway to the west. Within the park, there are seven inter-connected lagoons totaling 190 acres (0.77 km^{2}). Water flows southward from the Chicago Botanic Garden through the lagoons to the Skokie River. The overall water level in the lagoons is controlled by the main control dam at Willow Road. Three low dams keep the water levels below the inner islands. Recreational opportunities at Skokie Lagoons include biking, fishing, boating, and birding.

== History ==
The site of Skokie Lagoons was previously a marsh, known by the Potawatomi name Chewbab Skokie ("Big Wet Prairie") or Skokie Marsh. The marsh was partially drained by local farmers, leaving a peat bog. During spring floods it became a lake that inundated adjacent property and roads. Between 1933 and 1940, the Civilian Conservation Corps (CCC) executed a plan to bring the waters under control. Several thousand workers moved four million yards of earth to recontour the land, creating the artificial lagoons of today. According to the Forest Preserve District of Cook County, "The massive effort was the largest CCC project in the nation."

From 1955 to 1974, a Nike anti-aircraft site was located within Skokie Lagoons, north of Tower Road.

High waters erode the shoreline, filling the lagoons with sediment and damaging the fish habitat. From 1995 to 1999, the Chicago Audubon Society began a program of shoreline restoration. Thousands of plants were added to the shoreline to help limit erosion. Once it was realized that most of the plants in the southern, downstream lagoons were lost during high water, restoration efforts were concentrated on the upstream lagoons. Efforts were made to clear invasive species such as garlic mustard and buckthorn, and replace them with native plants and grasses like goldenrod, tall coreopsis, compass plant, cup plant, aster, coneflower, switchgrass, rattlesnake masters, woodland brome and cinquefoil.

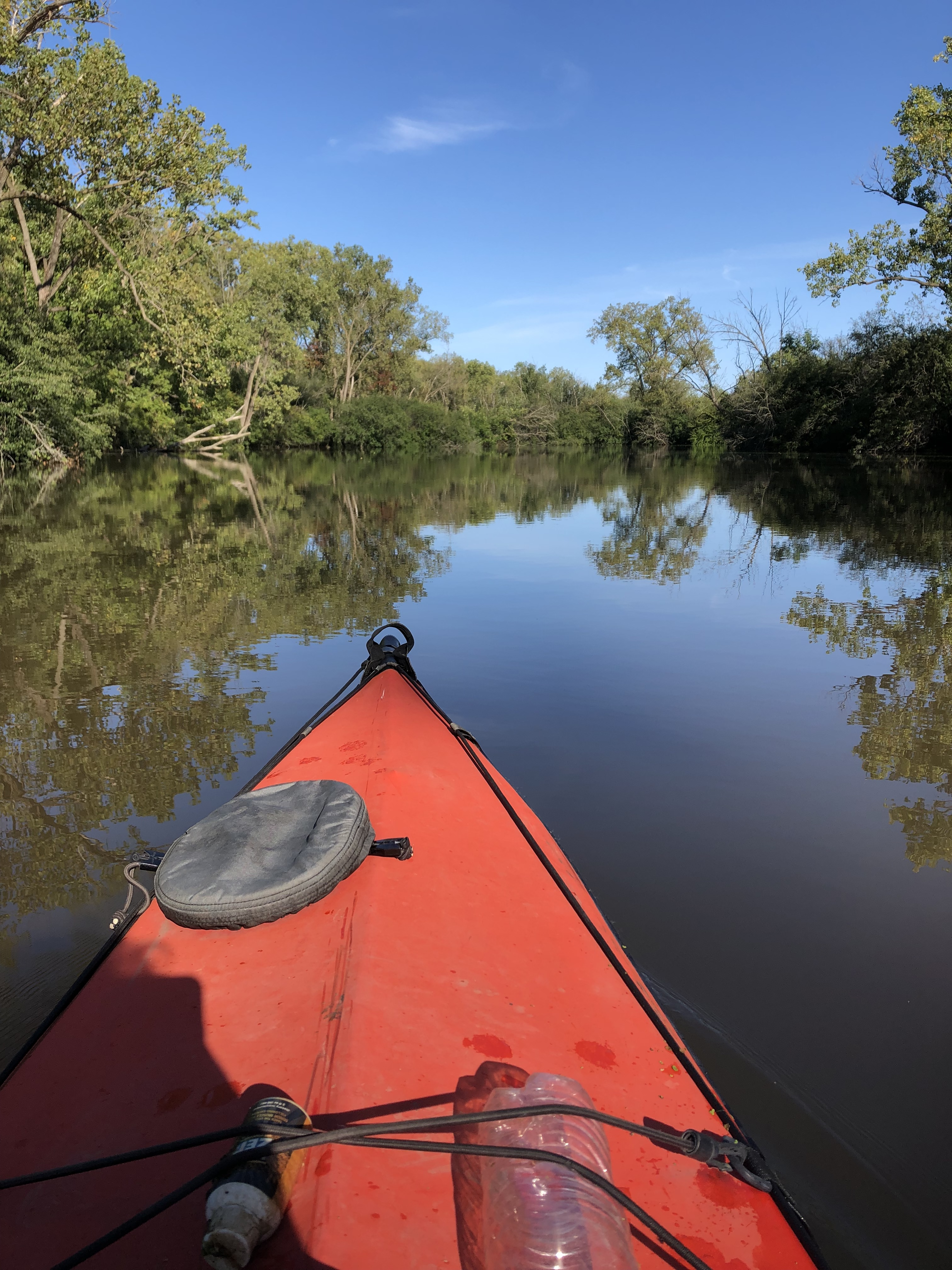
Kayak view from West Lagoon along Edens Expressway.

In 1996, the FPDCC began a restoration program, which included the use of aquatic herbicides to improve shore fishing, dredging to remove sediment, poisoning and restocking the fish and building a boat launch south of Tower Road. The 2008 Illinois EPA assessment of the water in Skokie Lagoons listed "Fish Consumption" and "Aesthetic Quality" as "Not Supporting" due to mercury, total suspended solids, phosphorus, aquatic plants and algae.

== Biking ==
A 1.6-mile (2.6 km) asphalt bike path runs to the west of the lagoons between Willow Road and Tower Road, and a 4.2-mile (6.8 km) loop encircles the lagoons between Tower Road and Dundee Road. This extends the 20-mile (32 km) North Branch Bicycle Trail to the Chicago Botanic Gardens.

== Fishing ==
Fish present are bass, walleye, northern pike, channel catfish, bluegill, crappie, and bullheads.

== Boating ==
The shallow waters (depth ~10 feet) are suitable for kayaking, canoeing and rowboating. At present, paddleboarding and sailboarding are not allowed on Forest Preserve of Cook County lakes, due to water quality issues.

== Birding ==
210 species have been seen in Skokie Lagoons.

== Reptiles/Amphibians ==
Many species of turtles and frogs have been seen in Skokie Lagoons including painted turtle, and common snapping turtle.
