= Schiller Woods magic water pump =

Purportedly magical water pump near Chicago

Coordinates: 41°57′07.6″N 87°50′38.4″W

Schiller Park magic water pump
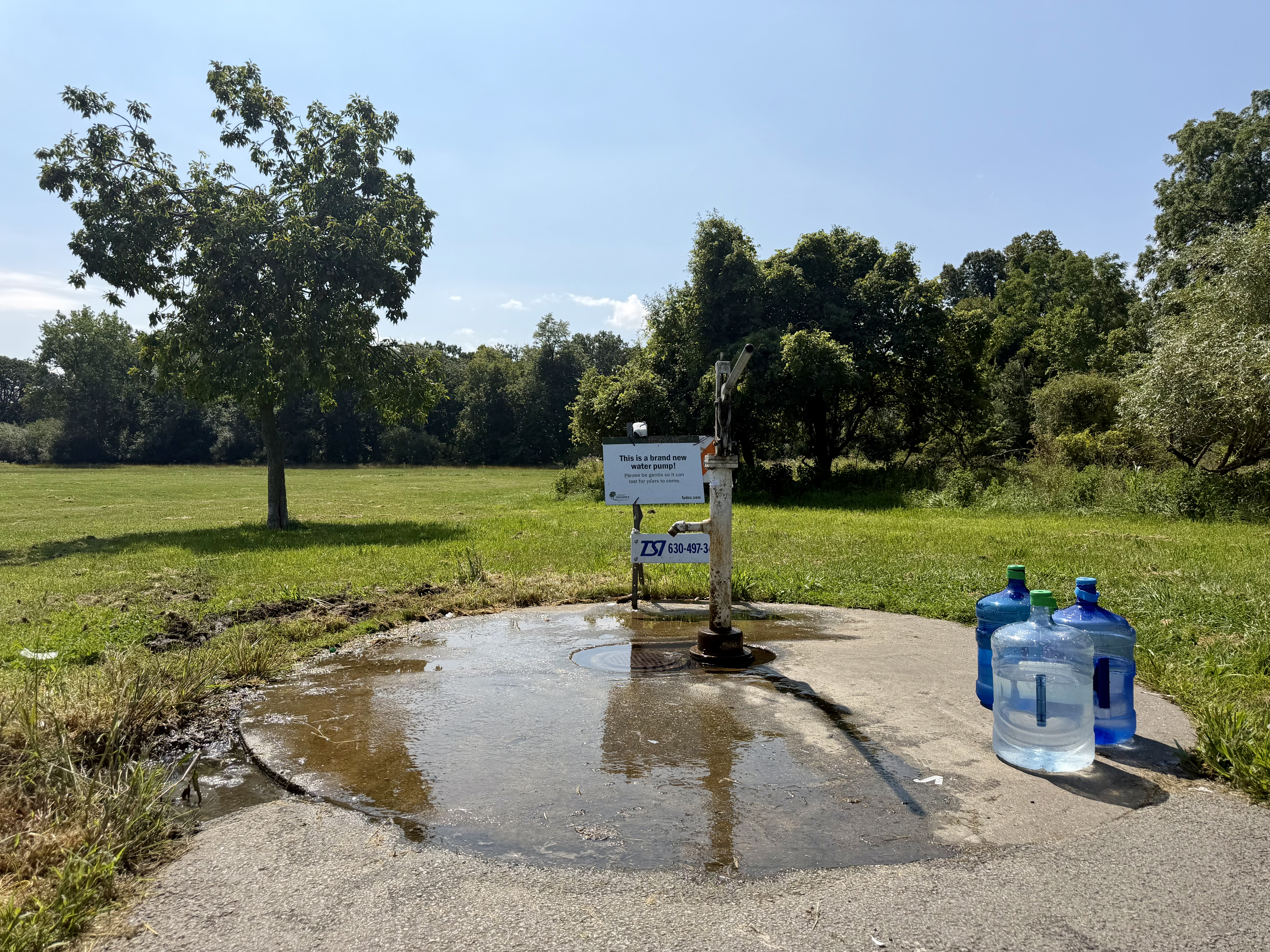
- Schiller Woods magic water pump in 2026
- Interactive map of Schiller Park magic water pump
- Location: Schiller Woods in O'Hare, Chicago

Site notes
- Owner: Forest Preserve District of Cook County

The Schiller Woods magic water pump is a public water pump at Schiller Woods Forest Preserve in Chicago, Illinois. Its water is believed by many local residents to have magical properties, improving health and vigor. Some believe that the pump's water extends the life of anyone who drinks from it regularly, leading to the nickname "Chicago's fountain of youth".

== History ==
The current pump was installed in 1945, replacing earlier versions that date to the 1930s. As early as 1957, the pump drew press attention for its popularity. A 1950s Forest Preserve superintendent noted that the well was so well-used that "when the handle is broken, everyone in the [office] knows about it within an hour". The pump handle was briefly removed in 1974 due to impurities in the water, but restored in 1975 after the water cleared.

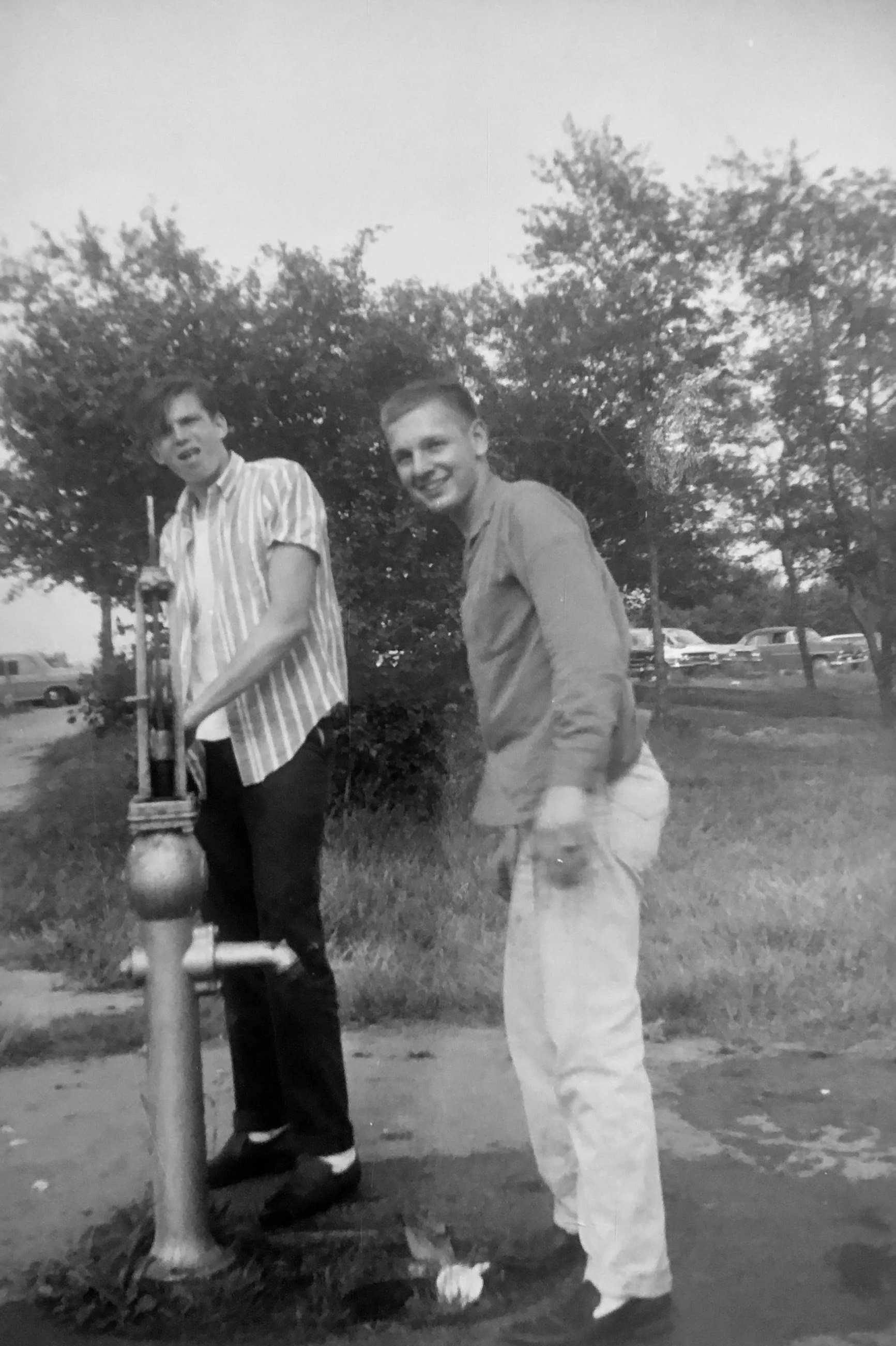
Using the pump in 1964

Some regular drinkers of the pump's water, a good many of whom are Catholic members of Chicago's large Polish community, believe that the pump was blessed by Pope John Paul II when he visited Chicago in 1979, but there is no evidence to support the notion. The Schiller Woods magic pump is the most-used of over 200 pumps maintained by the Forest Preserve department of Cook County, necessitating yearly repairs. In 2024, a local brewery made a small batch of beer called "Regeneration Station" using the pump's water.

== Water properties ==
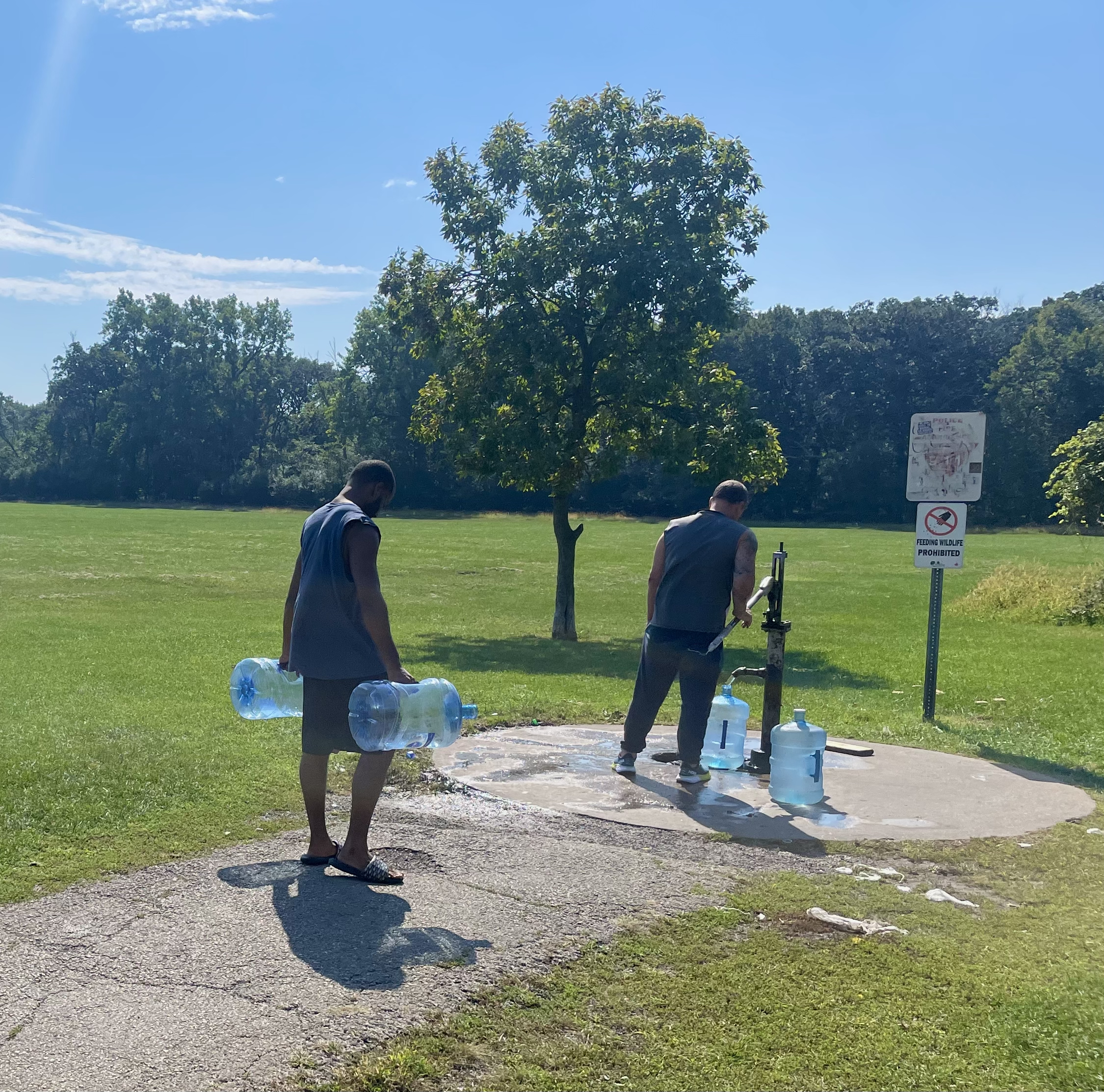
Using the pump in 2022

Due to the pump's popularity its water is tested regularly by the Forest Preserve authorities, who say it is safe to drink. The pump's water is drawn from a natural aquifer 31–85 feet (9.4–25.9 m) deep and is untreated. Compared to Chicago tap water, it has less copper and scant iron, with slightly higher pH and high levels of dissolved minerals. A Forest Preserve manager speculated in 1986 that the aquifer's heavy use may make its water less stagnant than that of similar pumps.

Many aficionados believe that the pump's water is actually drawn from far afield; theories include Lake Superior (about 630 miles (1,010 km) north), Lake Huron (around 370 miles (600 km) east), or a secret supply of water reserved for the wealthy. In the 1950s, a Forest Preserve staff member stated that they believed the pump's water came from Lake Superior, but by the 1980s, officials began describing it simply as well-water from the aquifer below. The water, often described as holy, has been compared to that of Lourdes for its purported healing power, ability to confer strength, and contribution to a long life.

About a quarter of habitual users of the pump do not ascribe it any magical powers and simply prefer the taste of its water. For instance, in the 1950s, one drinker, a bartender by trade, explained straightforwardly that "it makes a better highball". A few drinkers state that it is similar to water used in mountain spas in Poland.

A nearly identical pump is located about 500 metres (0.31 mi) north-northwest, also on Forest Preserve land, and draws from the same aquifer, but is shunned by magic pump devotees.

== See also ==
- God's Acre
- Ojo Caliente Hot Springs
