= Skokie River =

River in the United States of America

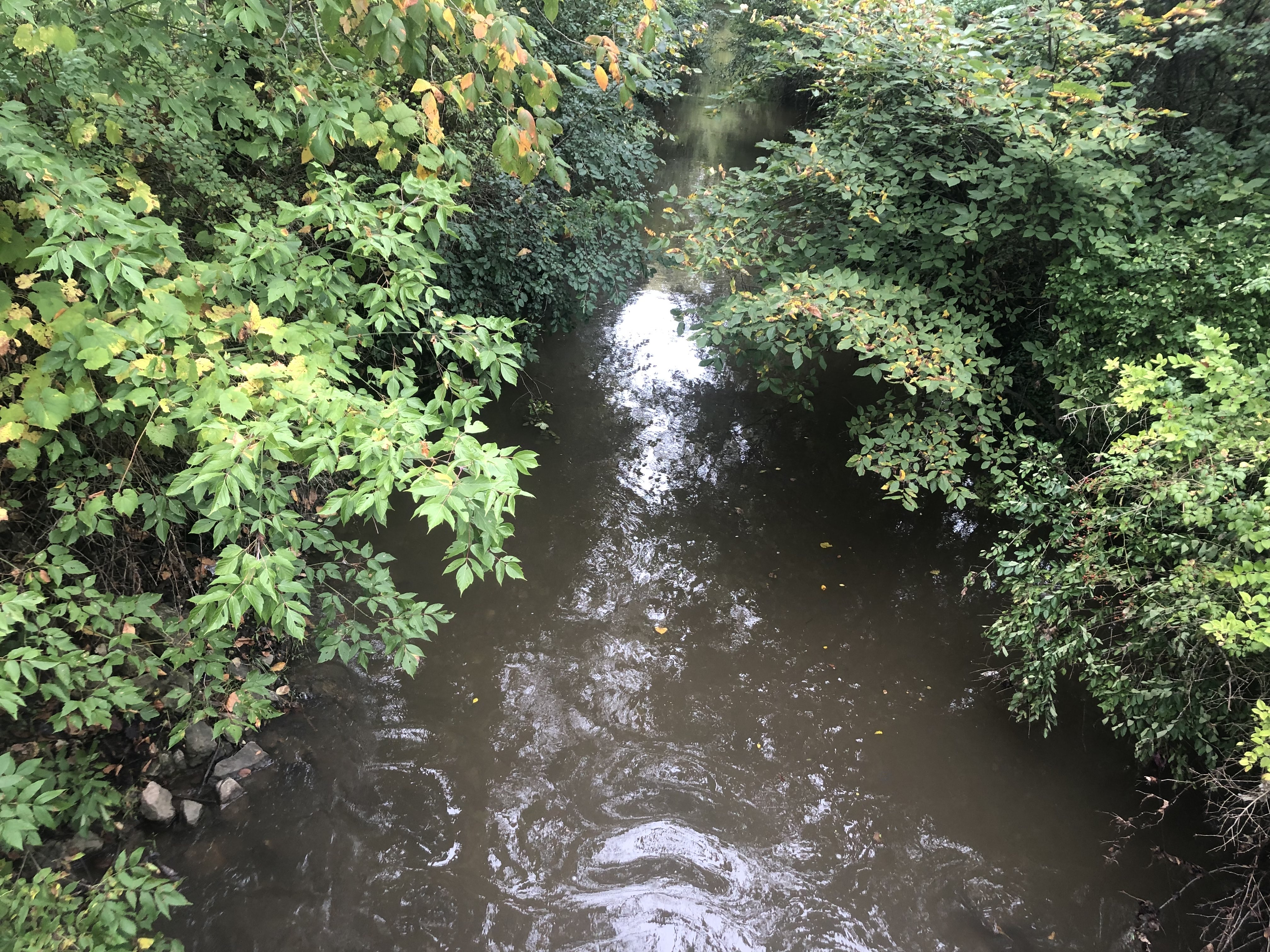
- Skokie River in the spring, taken from the bridge on Old Elm road in Lake Forest

Physical characteristics
- Source
  - location: North Chicago, Illinois
  - coordinates: 42°18′42″N 87°52′22″W
  - elevation: 686 ft (209 m)
- Mouth
  - location: Confluence with the North Branch Chicago River, Northfield, Illinois
  - coordinates: 42°05′15″N 87°46′20″W
  - elevation: 614 ft (187 m)

Basin features
- Progression: Skokie River → North Branch Chicago River → Chicago River → Chicago Sanitary and Ship Canal → Des Plaines River → Illinois River → Mississippi → Gulf of Mexico
- GNIS ID: 418584

The Skokie River (or East Fork of the North Branch of the Chicago River) is a 20-mile-long (32 km) river that flows through the northern suburbs of Chicago, Illinois, United States. It flows almost parallel to the shore of Lake Michigan, and historically discharged its outflow into that lake via the Chicago River. However, the construction of the Chicago Sanitary and Ship Canal in 1900 caused the drainage of the Chicago River, including its Skokie River tributary, to flow southwestward towards the Mississippi River.

The Skokie River rises from a flat area, historically a wetland, on the west side of the city of Waukegan. Flowing southward through the North Shore suburbs of Lake County, the river enters Cook County and discharges its flow into the North Branch of the Chicago River at Wilmette Golf Club between Morton Grove and Wilmette. More than 1,100 houses occupy parcels of property located in New Trier Township within the Skokie River floodplain.

== History ==
The Skokie River was traditionally a wetland river that flowed very slowly through a valley left behind by two parallel sand dunes that bordered Lake Michigan. In early historical times, the river had no defined banks, was filled with wet prairie grasses and forbs, and swelled or shrank in line with the seasons and with recent precipitation and runoff.

The river had a large population of fish and waterbirds. A seasonal village of the Native Americans stood at the river's mouth in what is now Morton Grove. The Pottawatomi called the long, low lakeside swale Chewab Skokie, or "big wet prairie." They did not conceptualize the drainage as a river, but as a long, ribbon-shaped wetland.

== The river today ==
As time passed, the drainage area of the Skokie River became some of the most valuable suburban land in the United States. It stood adjacent to key commuter lines of the Chicago and North Western Railway and the Milwaukee Road (both now operated by Metra), and was valuable to developers as early as the late 19th century. As the river and its drainage area were flood-prone, this created problems.

The Skokie River, in the 20th century, became one of the most altered rivers in the Chicago area. The river and its tributaries were extensively ditched, embanked, and landscaped. In Lake County, the river valley west of suburbs such as Highland Park and Lake Forest became home to a series of golf course developments, with the river re-landscaped into a gently descending staircase of water hazards.

Further south in Cook County, much of the river basin was acquired by the Forest Preserve District of Cook County in the early 20th century and then, in the 1930s, landscaped by the Civilian Conservation Corps (CCC) into the Skokie Lagoons Forest Preserve. For a time, the Skokie Lagoons project utilized ten separate CCC companies, making the lagoons the largest CCC project in the United States. The wetlands were dredged and replaced with seven artificial lagoons as much as 16 ft (4.9 m) deep, in line with pastoral landscape appreciation patterns of the time. The lagoons cover 190 acres (77 ha) in area. The Forest Preserve District took some limited actions in the 1990s to alter some of the lagoons and try to restore a vestige of the original Skokie River wetland terrain.

The Skokie River floodplain continues to be re-landscaped for multiple uses. In 2013, the Wilmette Golf Club, which is located in re-landscaped wetlands at the river's mouth, was scheduled to rebuild its grounds to reduce (but not eliminate) course flooding. As of 2013, the Forest Preserve District periodically restocks the Skokie River with fish matching some of the species present in early historical times, including bass, walleye, northern pike, channel catfish, bluegill, crappie, and bullheads. Authorities try to keep carp, an invasive alien, under control.

In 2019, threats to property values caused by the placements of properties within the Skokie River floodplain were cited as justification for lowering the assessments of more than 1,100 local parcels of residential property by amounts as much as $1.0 million per parcel. The assessment-relief plan was later reversed after a public outcry.

== See also ==
- List of Illinois rivers
