= North Branch Trail =

Cycle path in Illinois, United States

- A stretch of the North Branch Trail in Chicago, Illinois
- Length: 36.7 mi (59.1 km)
- Location: Cook County, Illinois
- Trailheads: LaBagh Woods; Chicago Botanic Garden
- Maintainer: Forest Preserve District of Cook County
- Website: https://fpdcc.com/places/trails/north-branch-trail-system/

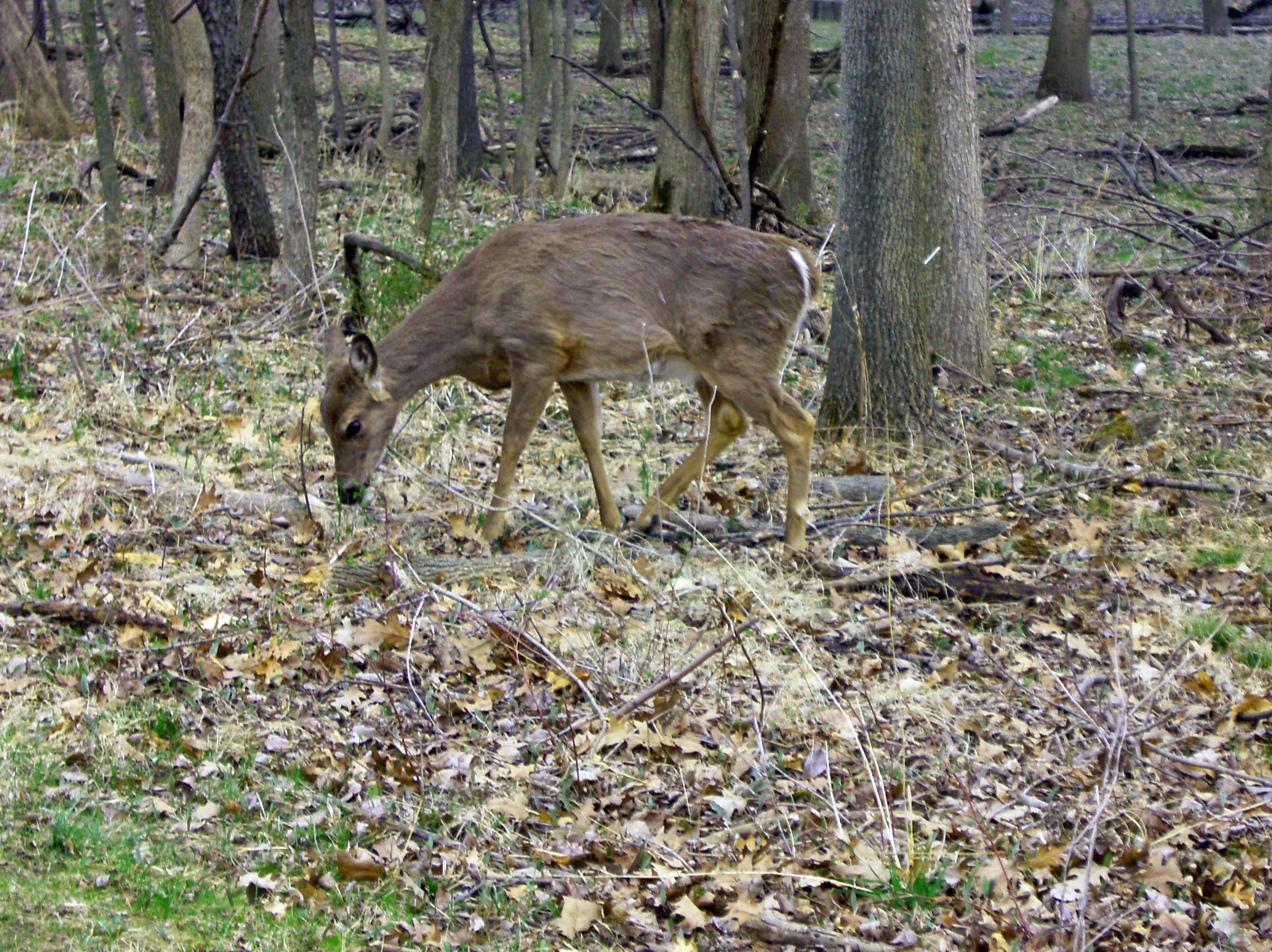
A fawn investigates some leaves a few feet away from the path.

The North Branch Trail is a Class I bicycle trail located in northeastern Cook County, Illinois. The trail starts at the western part of Gompers Park in Chicago (41°59′51.4″N 87°46′2.9″W), and from there it continues north approximately 22 miles (35 km) to Glencoe (42°8′15.9″N 87°46′53.6″W). The trail follows a path along the North Branch of the Chicago River, the Skokie River and the Skokie Lagoons.

Along the path, trail users will find themselves passing through city streets and into quiet forests where the sounds of the city quickly fade away. Because the area is located within a forest preserve, many generations of wildlife have lived and died with limited but safe contact with humans. As a result, it is not uncommon to find animals such as deer who have no fear of humans and may even stop and examine trail users as much as the humans themselves. The trail adjoins an equestrian facility at Golf and Harms Roads.

Parking and access to the trail is available in many locations, including Harms Woods in Skokie, where users can link with Skokie Valley Trail and the Tower Road boat launch. The trail is also nearby Morton Grove, Edgebrook, and Forest Glen stations on Metra's Milwaukee District North Line towards the southern end.

At Tower Road, the trail divides and loops around the Skokie Lagoons, where the Civilian Conservation Corps carried out conservation work during the Great Depression. A plaque commemorating this work is located east of the Edens Expressway and north of Willow Road.

Ending at Dundee Road, riders can proceed northward to the Chicago Botanic Garden via the south service entrance. Traversing the Garden and exiting the north entrance allows a brief portage west on Lake-Cook Rd to the southern end of the Skokie Valley Bike Path. In August 2014 the trail was extended along Lake-Cook Road from the Botanic Garden eastward to connect to the Green Bay Trail and the Union Pacific North Line at Braeside station.

== History ==
The trail started after World War II as several disconnected and unpaved equestrian trails, most of which still exist. The area was also traversed by old roadways, and footpaths laid down by hikers over the years.

Starting in the 1970s, the Cook County Forest Preserve District began converting this to a dedicated paved trail. A major construction push in 1976 resulted in a complete trail from Devon Ave to Winnetka Ave, and the completion of the Lake St overpass for $505,000.

The abandoning of the Skokie Lagoons (Nike) missile base (constructed during the Cold War) allowed the trail to be extended to Dundee Road. The stretch of trail north of Tower Rd follows the original service road to the launch complex.

A portage along Winnetka Rd to cross over the Edens Expressway was eliminated in the early 1980s when major resurfacing of the expressway presented an opportunity to install a short tunnel under the expressway, eliminating the need for a proposed million dollar bridge. The fork in the trail just west of Happ Rd was the route to Winnetka Rd for the bridge crossing; today it is just an access point.

The present paved trail was largely completed in the 1980s with a continuous paved surface, and overpasses at Oakton Street and Lake Ave. The entire length of the paved trail was torn up and repaved in 2007, correcting many poor sections and offering a smooth and groomed pathway.

Much work was done on the equestrian trails as well. Although some equestrian trails were overlaid by the bicycle trail, many still exist, paralleling the paved route. A complete gravel trail runs from the equestrian facility at Golf road to the Willow Rd dam site, with a separate underpass at the Edens Expressway.

=== North Branch Trail Southern Extension ===
On December 21, 2015, the Forest Preserve of Cook County broke ground on Stage 1 of the North Branch Trail Southern Extension, extending the trail 1.8 miles south to Forest Glen Woods. On September 20, 2016, at 3pm the first stage of the southern extension opened. The second stage of the extension has added another 1.2 miles further south to Gompers Park. Other improvements in 2016 included adding park benches and other conveniences along the route.
