= Ned Brown Forest Preserve =

Forest preserve in Cook County, Illinois

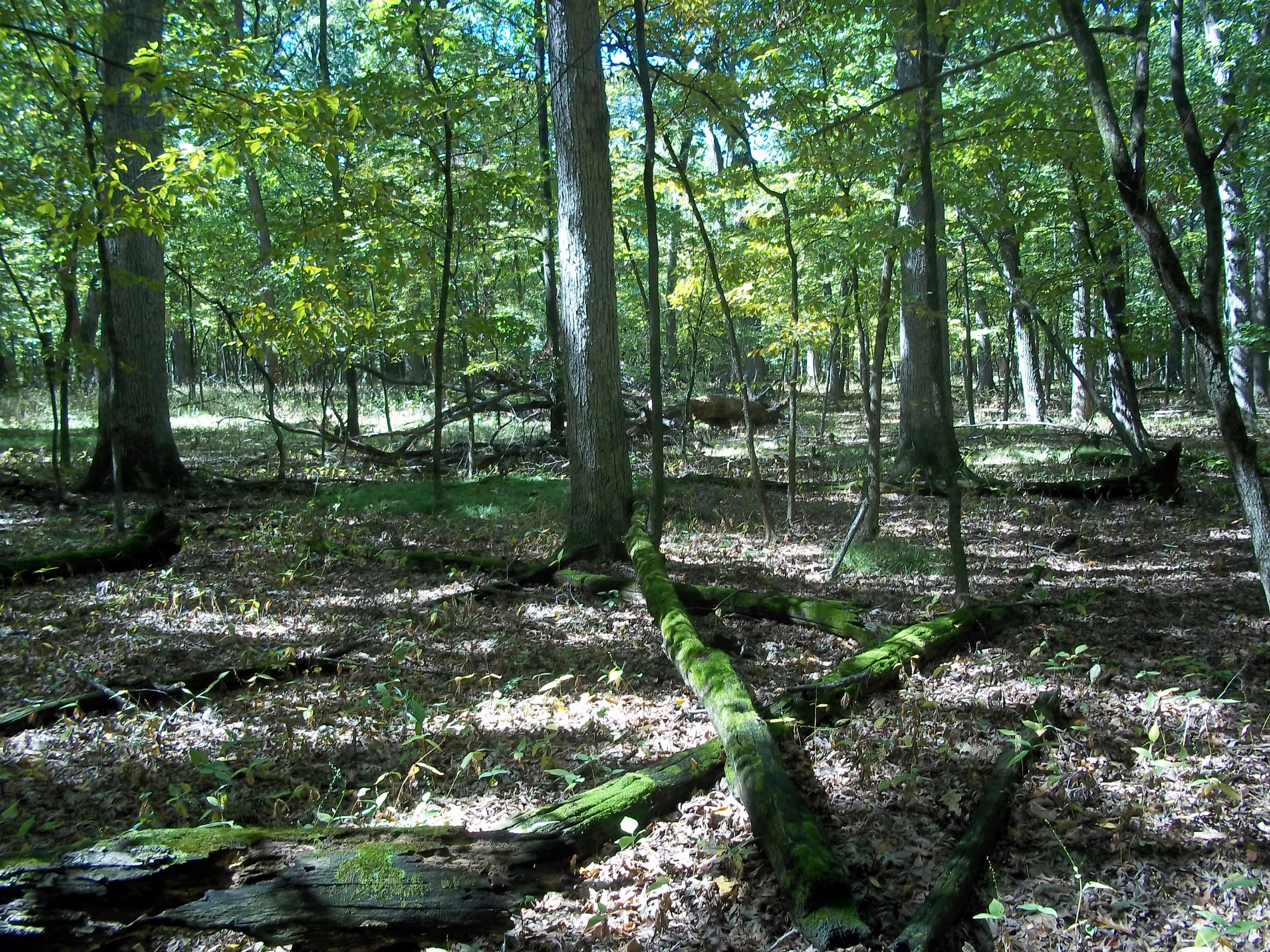
- Busse Forest National Natural Landmark

- Location within Illinois
- Location: Cook County, Illinois
- Nearest city: Schaumburg
- Coordinates: 42°02′32″N 88°00′12″W
- Area: 3,700 acres (1,500 ha)

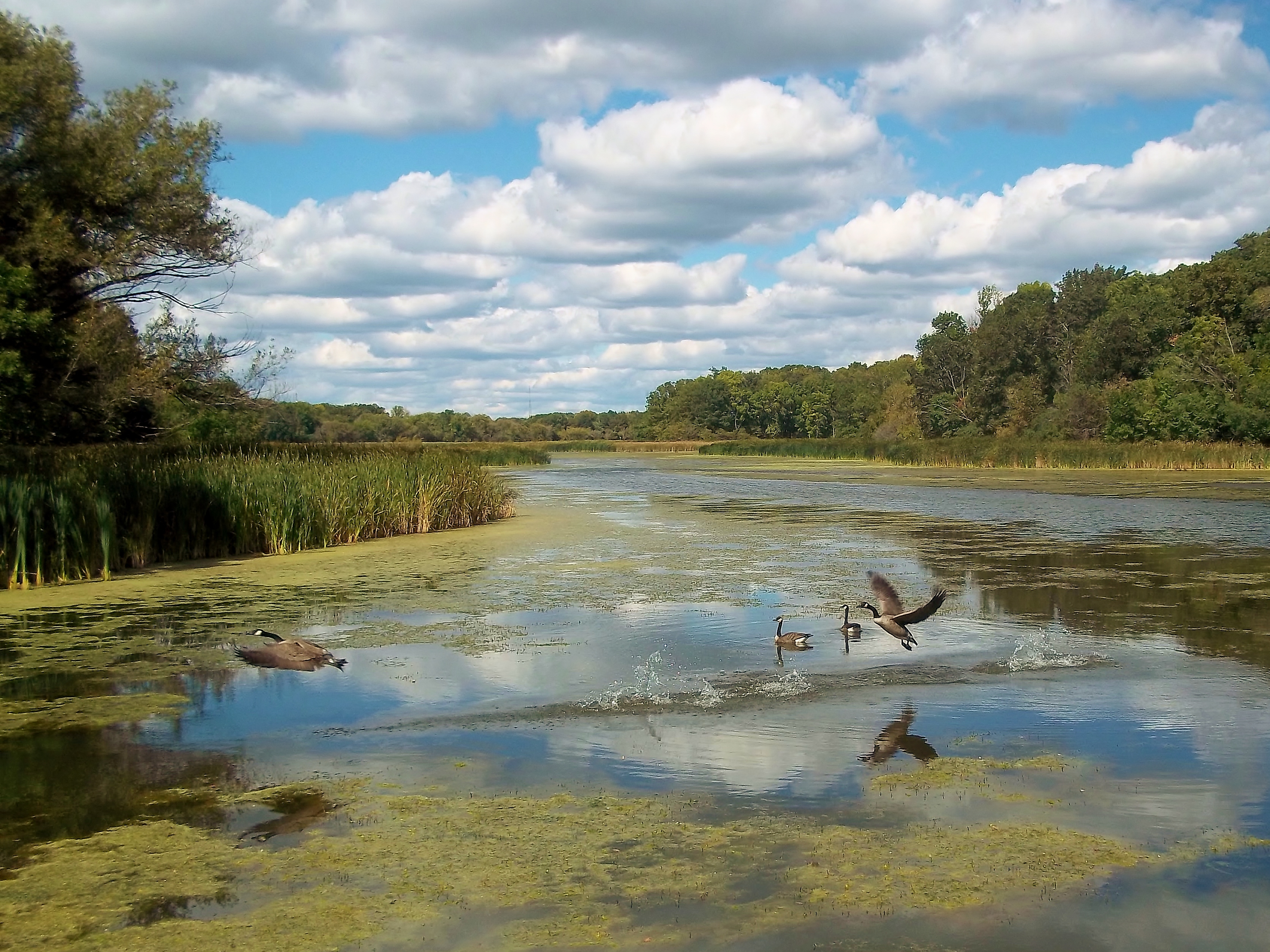
Canada geese on Salt Creek in the preserve looking toward Busse Woods

The Ned Brown Forest Preserve, popularly known as Busse Woods, adjoining Rolling Meadows, Elk Grove Village and Schaumburg in Illinois, is a 3,700-acre (1,500 ha) unit of the Cook County Forest Preserve system. It is named after Edward "Ned" Eagle Brown. A section of the northeast quadrant of the forest preserve is the Busse Forest Nature Preserve, which was registered as a National Natural Landmark in February 1980, as a well preserved example of the lake-flatwoods habitat. Busse Forest Preserve (Busse Woods) was named for Cook County Commissioner William Busse in 1949.

== Biology ==
Busse Woods, the heart of the forest preserve, is a mature Great Lakes hardwood forest. A 440-acre (180 ha) segment of the woods, the Busse Forest Nature Preserve, is listed as a national natural landmark as a surviving fragment of flatwoods, a type of damp-ground forest formerly typical of extremely level patches of ground in the Great Lakes region. Parcels of land with slow rates of precipitation runoff into adjacent wetlands and streams were likely to develop into flatwoods. A flatwoods forest is characterized by red maple, swamp white oak, and black ash trees. The black ash trees of Busse Woods are threatened by the emerald ash borer, which was reported in Illinois for the first time in 2006.

Other parts of Busse Woods are better-drained and include species more typical of the forests of northern Illinois, such as the basswood, hickory, sugar maple, and white oak, the latter species being the state tree of Illinois.

== Recreation ==
There are 10.4 miles (17 km) of paved bicycle trail, the Busse Woods Trail, through the forest preserve: a 7.3-mile (12 km) loop and two spurs providing pedestrian and bicycle access to the preserve. In contrast to the natural area, the northwest and southwest quadrants of the preserve are dominated by Busse Lake, a 590-acre (240 ha) artificial reservoir that serves as a flood-control catchment for Salt Creek that flows in from Rolling Meadows and by the tall skyscrapers of eastern Schaumburg.

== Stewardship ==
The Friends of Busse Woods, a non-governmental organization, began operations in 2008. It cooperates with the Forest Preserve District of Cook County to oversee stewardship partnering operations at Busse Woods. Partnership operations include invasive species management, trash removal, and native plant reseeding and restocking. The operations are carried out by volunteer stewards.

== In popular culture ==
The stoner metal band Acid King named their 1999 record Busse Woods after the forest preserve, as it was a location that frontwoman Lori S. would frequent as a teenager for recreation. The cover art includes a sign demarcating the entrance to the preserve.

== See also ==
- Cook County Forest Preserves
- Sauk Trail Woods
- North Creek Woods
