= Hoxie Farm site =

Archaeological site in Illinois, United States

Hoxie Farm Site
- Location in Illinois Location in United States
- 41°44′00″N 87°40′00″W
- Location: on Thorn Creek in Calumet City near Chicago, Illinois

Site notes
- Area: 14 acres (5.7 ha)

The Hoxie Farm site (11Ck-4) is located on Thorn Creek in Thornton, Illinois Cook County Forest Preserve in Cook County, Illinois, near the city of Chicago. It is classified as a late prehistoric to Protohistoric/Early Historic site with Upper Mississippian Huber affiliation.

== History of archaeological investigations ==
Excavations were carried out in 1953 as a salvage project before the site was destroyed by the construction of a highway in the area.

== Results of data analysis ==
Excavations at the site yielded prehistoric artifacts, pit features, burials, plant remains and animal bone.

=== Features ===
A total of 56 pit features were identified at the site. Sixteen of these had ash and carbonized material within their fill, and are classified as fire pits. The remainder were classified as refuse or storage pits.

=== Burials ===
Eleven badly preserved burials were recovered from Hoxie Farm. Five of them were accompanied by grave goods including pottery vessels, red ochre, a copper bead, and canid bones. A burial of an adult female included an otter skull with copper pieces placed in the eye sockets.

=== Plant remains ===
The carbonized remains of maize were recovered at Hoxie Farm. Feature 25 yielded 40 kernels, of which 36 were of the Eastern 8-row race.

=== Animal remains ===
Remains from several species were recovered from the site. The main species present were deer, turtle, fish, Canis sp. (dog or wolf), elk, dog, muskrat and duck. These remains were not modified into tools like the bone tools described in the Artifacts section below, and may be considered food remains or, in the case of the dog, the remains of ceremonial activities. Dog sacrifice and dog meat consumption was observed to have ceremonial and religious implications in early Native American tribes.

=== Artifacts ===
Artifacts recovered from the site included:

- Pottery – total of over 12,000 sherds. Many vessels were recovered complete or were reconstructable, which greatly aided in the analysis. The pottery artifacts will be discussed in more detail below.
- Stone artifacts – including projectile points, scrapers, knives, chisels, and punches/awls. Of the projectile points, the most numerous category was the small triangular Madison point.
- Ground stone artifacts – including celts, hammerstones/manos, smoking pipes, abraders (aka arrow shaft straighteners) and pieces of hematite (source of pigment for red paint).
- Bone and antler tools – a wide variety of bone and antler tools were recovered from the site, including elk and bison scapula hoes, antler flakers, elk antler punches, matting needles, and bone and antler awls.
- Non-utilitarian bone artifacts – several items were recovered that were used for personal adornment or other social purposes, including bone rasps (musical instruments), bone bracelet engraved with a human figure, bone tubes (possibly hair adornments), a hair pin made from a turkey long bones, a pebble with an engraved "weeping eye" motif, and a bone pendant with an unusual design that resembles a human figure holding a bow. There was also some bone or antler dice or game pieces.
- Metal artifacts – included a copper bead fragment, 2 rolled copper hair beads, one flat copper fragment, 1 serpent effigy made of copper, a copper awl, 3 sheet brass fragments, and 2 small copper sheets with a burial. All of the metal artifacts were aboriginal in manufacture except for the last two, which are of European origin.

The non-pottery artifacts found at an archaeological site can provide useful cultural context as well as a glimpse into the domestic tasks performed at a site; ceremonial or religious activities; recreational activities; and clothing or personal adornment.

Some of the most prominent and diagnostic non-pottery artifacts are presented here in more detail. Due to copyright restrictions, images of the items cannot be shown, but links are provided to public domain images of similar items from other Upper Mississippian-affiliated sites:

Material	Description	Link to image from similar site	Qty	Function / use	Comments / associations
Chipped stone	Small triangular points (aka Madison points)		259	Hunting/fishing/warfare	Also known as "arrowheads"; are thought to be arrow-tips for bows-and-arrows. The usage of the bow-and-arrow seems to have greatly increased during the Late Woodland, probably as a result of increased conflict.
Chipped stone	Biface blades/knives		8 fragments	Domestic function / cutting applications	Typical of Upper Mississippian sites, particularly Huber and Oneota (Orr focus)
Chipped stone	Humpback end scraper		87	Domestic function / processing wood or hides	Typical of Upper Mississippian sites, particularly Huber and Oneota (Orr focus)
Antler	Antler flakers		6	Domestic function / stone tool manufacture	These have also been recovered at the nearby Huber sites of Anker and Huber
Copper	small copper sheets in burial		2	Religious-Spiritual function / grave goods	Historic European-manufactured artifact; placed in the eyes of an otter skull included in the burial of an adult female
Stone	Arrow shaft straightener		3	Domestic function / straightening arrow shafts for bows-and-arrows	Typical at Upper Mississippian sites
Antler	Socketed antler projectile points		4 tanged; 1 untanged	Hunting/fishing/warfare	The tanged or barbed type is characteristic of Fisher; the untanged type is more typical of Oneota
Bone	Scapula knives		3	Domestic function / cutting applications	Also recovered from the Fisher site; the Hoxie Farm specimens appear to be broken hoes that were refashioned as knives
Bone	Metapodial flesher (aka Deer cannon bone beamer)		2	Domestic function / hide-working tool	Commonly found at Fisher and Langford sites
Bone	Scapula hoes		9 (5 elk, 4 bison)	Domestic function / Agricultural-horticultural or general digging tool	Common at Fisher and Oneota sites; they may have been used to dig out the pits features present at Hoxie Farm.
Bone or Antler	Dice		3	Entertainment function / gambling	These have been found at Fisher, Huber, Langford and Oneota (especially Grand River focus and Lake Winnebago focus) and may have been used in a gambling game. Gambling was noted to be a popular pastime among the early Native American tribes.
Bone	Matting needles		5 fragments	Domestic function / sewing mats and/or clothing	Common at other late prehistoric sites in northern Illinois
Bone	Bone awls		6	Domestic function / hide-working tool	Common at other late prehistoric sites in northern Illinois
Stone	Pipes (both stemmed and unstemmed)		3 fragments	Ceremonial-Recreational function / pipe smoking	Stemmed pipes were used for sacred/ceremonial occasions; unstemmed pipes were for recreational smoking; one of the Hoxie Farm pipes was decorated with incised lines and one was associated with red ochre in a burial
Stone	Engraved pebble with "weeping eye" motif		8	Art function / Religious-Spiritual significance	The "weeping eye" motif was associated with the Southern Ceremonial Complex; also seen at the Anker site; indicates the Huber people were in contact with southern cultures.
Bone	Bone rasp (musical instrument)		2 fragments	Ceremonial-Recreational function / entertainment or use at ceremony	Also found at other Huber sites as well as Whittlesey and Fort Ancient sites
Copper	Copper serpent effigy		1	Art piece or Religious function	Similar copper serpent figurines have been found at other sites in the American Midwest region: several Oneota Orr focus sites in Iowa; the Anker Site near Chicago, Illinois; the Summer Island site in Michigan; the Fifield site in northwestern Indiana and the Madisonville site in Ohio. The Orr focus sites, Madisonville and Summer Island all have early European trade goods associated, indicating these figurines were still being made at the time of European contact.

=== Upper Mississippian Huber pottery ===
Pottery is a valuable tool for analyzing prehistoric cultures. It is typically abundant at archaeological sites, and the details of its manufacture and decoration are sensitive indicators of time, space, and culture.

Although the Huber tradition was well known by archaeologists for decades following the original excavations at the Huber site, a formalized typology was not developed until Charles Faulkner devised one in his 1972 report on the Griesmer site in northwestern Indiana, just to the east of Chicago.

Huber pottery is characterized by shell-tempered, smooth surface pottery with globular vessel shape and restricted orifices with everted rims. Some vessels also have strap handles. Decoration (when present) usually consists of vertical or obliquely applied incised lines generally running from the lip to the shoulder. Rarely, surfaces are cordmarked or smoothed over cordmarking. The top of the lip is either plain or decorated with fine to wide notching. A minority also have punctate decoration, mostly in combination with the trailed lines.

Of the 7 whole or reconstructed vessels, 5 are of the type Fifield Bold, one of Huber Trailed, and one that is stylistically different from either Fisher or Huber.

18 different rim profile types were identified but almost all of them are everted, mostly sharply everted, and 4 types make up the vast majority of vessels. The most common type is sharply everted with flat lip; the other most common forms are sharply everted with pointed lip, sharply everted and lip thickened to the interior, and sharply everted with flat lip thickened to the exterior. The most common form of decoration observed on body sherds was medium parallel lines. This was true for both plain and cordmarked surfaces but the trend was more pronounced with the cordmarked surfaces. Wide-notched lip decoration was most common; many were medium notched or unnotched but few were fine-notched.

Following Faulkner's typology, this is the proportion of the pottery types at the site:

- Huber Plain – 62.5%, characterized by a plain surface
- Huber Trailed – 6%, characterized by a plain surface decorated with fine incised lines
- Huber Bold – 1.5%, characterized by a plain surface decorated with wide lines, possibly finger-trailed
- Huber Cordmarked – 23.5%, characterized by a cordmarked surface
- Fisher – about 5% of the assemblage was identified as belonging to the Fisher tradition, another Upper Mississippian culture which existed in the southern Great Lakes and was at least partially coterminous with Huber. Fisher pottery is characterized by shell-tempering and predominantly cordmarked surfaces, often decorated with curvilinear designs. 4% of Fisher sherds/vessels were classified as Fifield Trailed and 1% were Fiflield Bold.
- Other types – 1%

=== Chronology of Hoxie Farm pottery within the Huber sequence ===
The trends in certain pottery traits are very time-sensitive and can be used as indicators of relative age. Based on information on other Huber sites in the area, archaeologists have determined early Huber pottery is more likely to have cordmarked surface finish; wide-trailed decoration; and notched lips. Late Huber pottery has predominately smooth surface finish; fine-line incised decoration; and unnotched lips.

In the Hoxie Farm site assemblage, 23.5% of sherds are cordmarked, which is more than on any other Huber culture site. Fine-line decoration is present on only 13% of decorated sherds. Also, only 20% of the lips are unnotched, compared to 49% at Huber and 45% at Oak Forest. This indicates a relatively early time placement for Hoxie Farm within the Huber sequence.

== Huber phase within the Upper Mississippian culture ==
Huber ware (and Huber culture) are often mentioned together with Fisher. Both Fisher and Huber are Upper Mississippian cultures which existed in the southern Lake Michigan region in the states of northern Illinois and Indiana and southwest Michigan. Both have shell-tempered pottery but Huber is predominantly plain surface with fine-line decoration and Fisher is predominantly cordmarked surface with wide-line decoration.

The relationship of Huber and Fisher both with each other and with other Upper Mississippian cultures in the area has long been a matter of debate and speculation among archaeologists. James Griffin, upon examining the artifacts from the original 1929 excavations, felt that Huber was a Component of the Oneota Aspect based on the form and design of the pottery, close to the Orr and Lake Winnebago foci, and that Fisher was part of a separate focus. Since that date, we've obtained a great deal more information and now we know that Fisher is the older of the two and Huber is the only one that has been found in association with early Historic European trade goods. Nevertheless, both Fisher and Huber coexist at the same sites seemingly at the same time. Hoxie Farm, Griesmer and Moccasin Bluff are examples of this.

Most archaeologists now believe that both Fisher and Huber are taxonomically-related phases within the Oneota tradition. The relationship between the two is time-related in that Huber is derived from Fisher; but there are also late Fisher sites like Fifield, where Fisher pottery is associated with late Prehistoric artifacts, so it is possible that Fisher also survived until the Protohistoric or early Historic period.

== Significance ==
The artifacts present at Hoxie Farm represent a well-rounded view of life in the Huber culture. Several items of personal adornment were found here, such as hair accessories, bracelets, and pendants. Domestic items include knives, scrapers, chisels, needles, and awls. The bone or antler dice implies games or gambling went on at the site; gambling among Native American tribes has been well-documented. A bone rasp indicates music was being performed for entertainment or for ceremonial purposes. The presence of stemmed pipes and several pieces of art with magical or spiritual overtones reflects on the spiritual life of the community.

There is direct evidence of cultivated plants at Hoxie Farm. The remains of maize were found along with hoes made of bison scapula and elk scapula. Deer bone was also present in abundance, along with arrowheads for bows-and-arrows, indicating the site residents still relied on hunting; and fish and turtle were also present in the animal bone remains, so they were also exploiting food resources of the nearby marshes and creeks.

With regards to seasonality of occupation, based on an analysis of the animal bone remains, the researchers determined the site was occupied from at least spring through fall. In fact the site may have been occupied year-round since there are storage pits to keep food during the winter. The presence of non-utilitarian items for music, games and religion also implies an extended residence.

Despite the fact that the Hoxie Farm site had European trade goods and thus was occupied at a very late date in prehistory, the pottery traits indicate an early placement in the Huber sequence. The answer may be that the site was occupied longer than the other Huber sites, and therefore the pottery from the entire Huber sequence is present, with early and late types intermixed. Since the site was not stratified, there was no way for the researchers to segregate artifacts from different time periods.
