= Chicago Portage National Historic Site =

National Historic Site of the United States

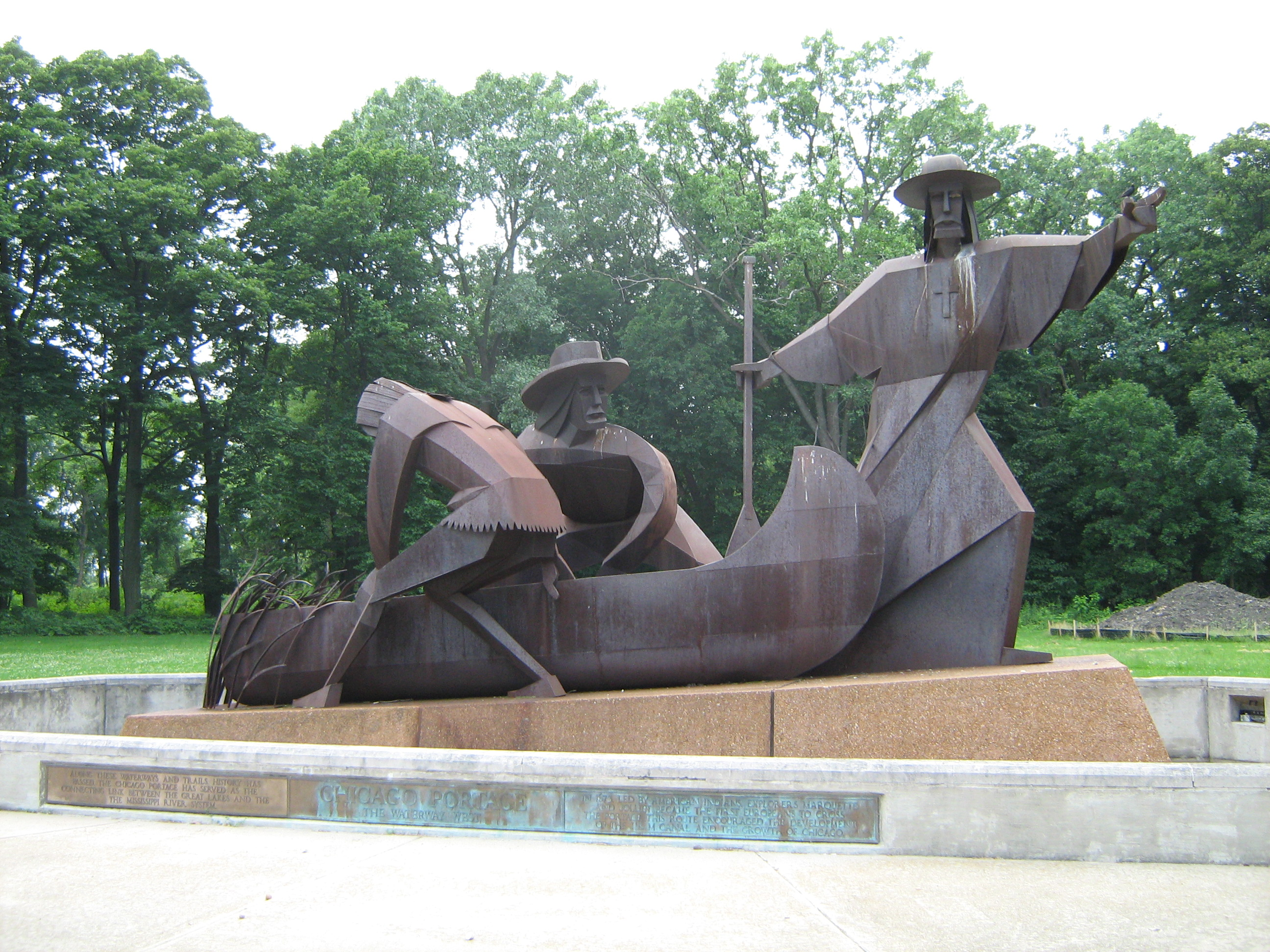

- Location within Illinois Location within the United States
- Location: 4800 S. Harlem Ave., Lyons, Cook County, Illinois, USA
- Coordinates: 41°48′20″N 87°48′25″W
- Established: 1952
- Governing body: Forest Preserve District of Cook County

- Chicago Portage National Historic Site
- U.S. National Register of Historic Places
- Location: 4800 S. Harlem Ave., Lyons, Illinois
- Area: 91.2 acres (36.9 ha)
- NRHP reference No.: 66000108
- Added to NRHP: October 15, 1966

The Chicago Portage National Historic Site is a National Historic Site commemorating the importance of the Chicago Portage in Lyons, Cook County, Illinois, United States. It is located in Chicago Portage Forest Preserve and the Ottawa Trail Woods Forest Preserve, at the junction of Portage Creek with the Des Plaines River, on the west side of Harlem Avenue on the line of 48th Street. Preserved within the park is the western end of the historic portage linking the Chicago River to the Des Plaines River, thereby linking the Great Lakes to the Mississippi River. A memorial depicting the portage of French explorers is located at the parking area. A trail leads from the memorial down into the portage wilderness area.

The site commemorates the Chicago Portage, first written about by French explorers Father Marquette and Louis Joliet during their use of the portage and exploration of the area between Lake Michigan and the Mississippi River. The portage crossed what was known as Mud Lake, which could be wet, swampy, frozen, or dry, depending on the season, and which has since been obliterated. Mud Lake extended roughly from the historic western end of the South Branch of the Chicago River (near today's Damen Avenue) to the Des Plaines River at the present National Historic Site. These explorers understood the importance of the easiest crossing of the continental divide between the Gulf of Mexico and Atlantic Ocean watersheds.

The site, which was designated January 3, 1952, as an affiliated area of the National Park Service, is owned and administered by the Forest Preserve District of Cook County. Visitor access is via Harlem Avenue, just north of Interstate 55. The site contains the parking area, a memorial statue, interpretive signs, and trails. Activities here are hiking and canoeing, and the Friends of the Chicago Portage sponsors guided walks.

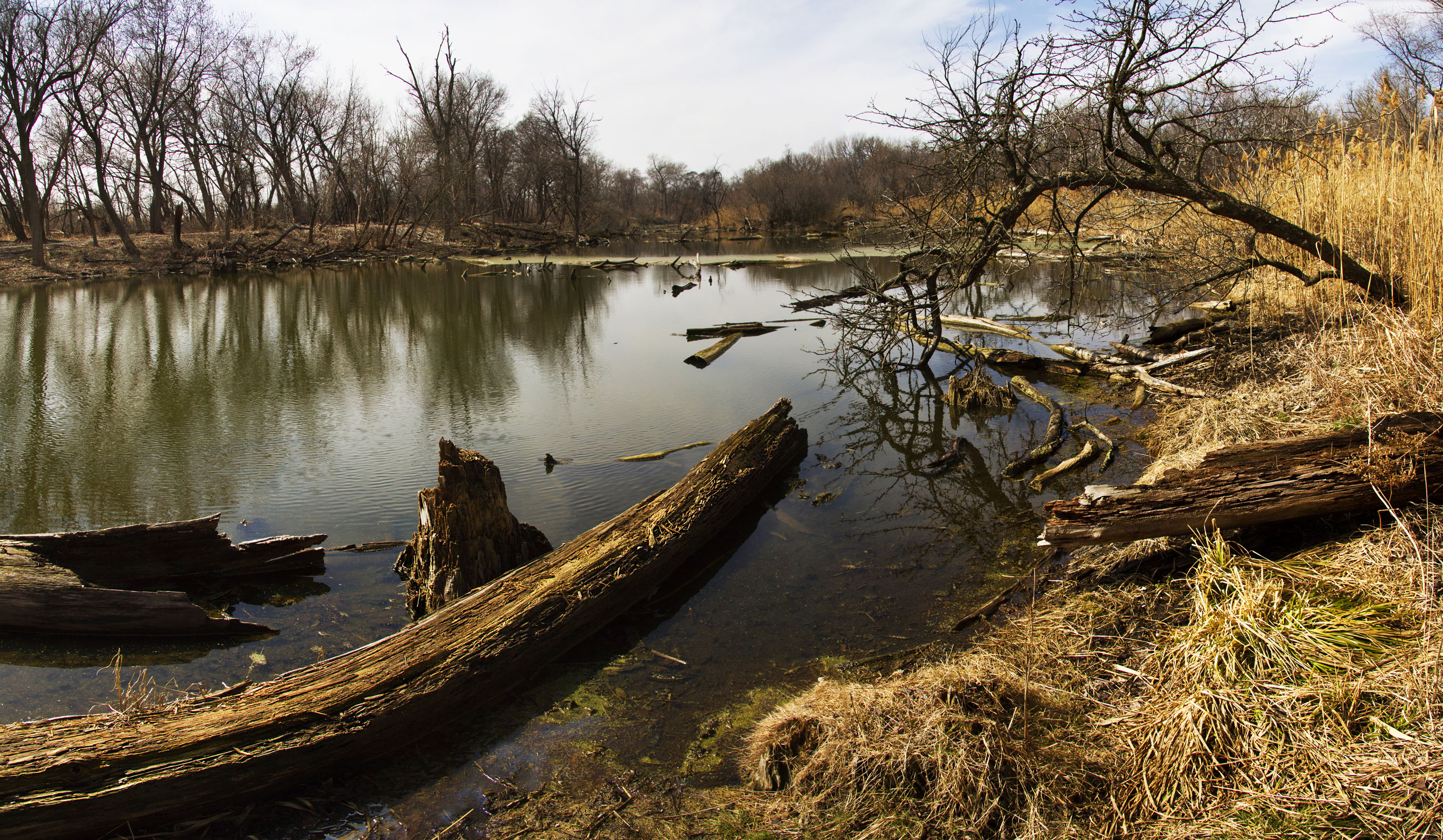
The Portage waterway at the Chicago Portage National Historic Site in March

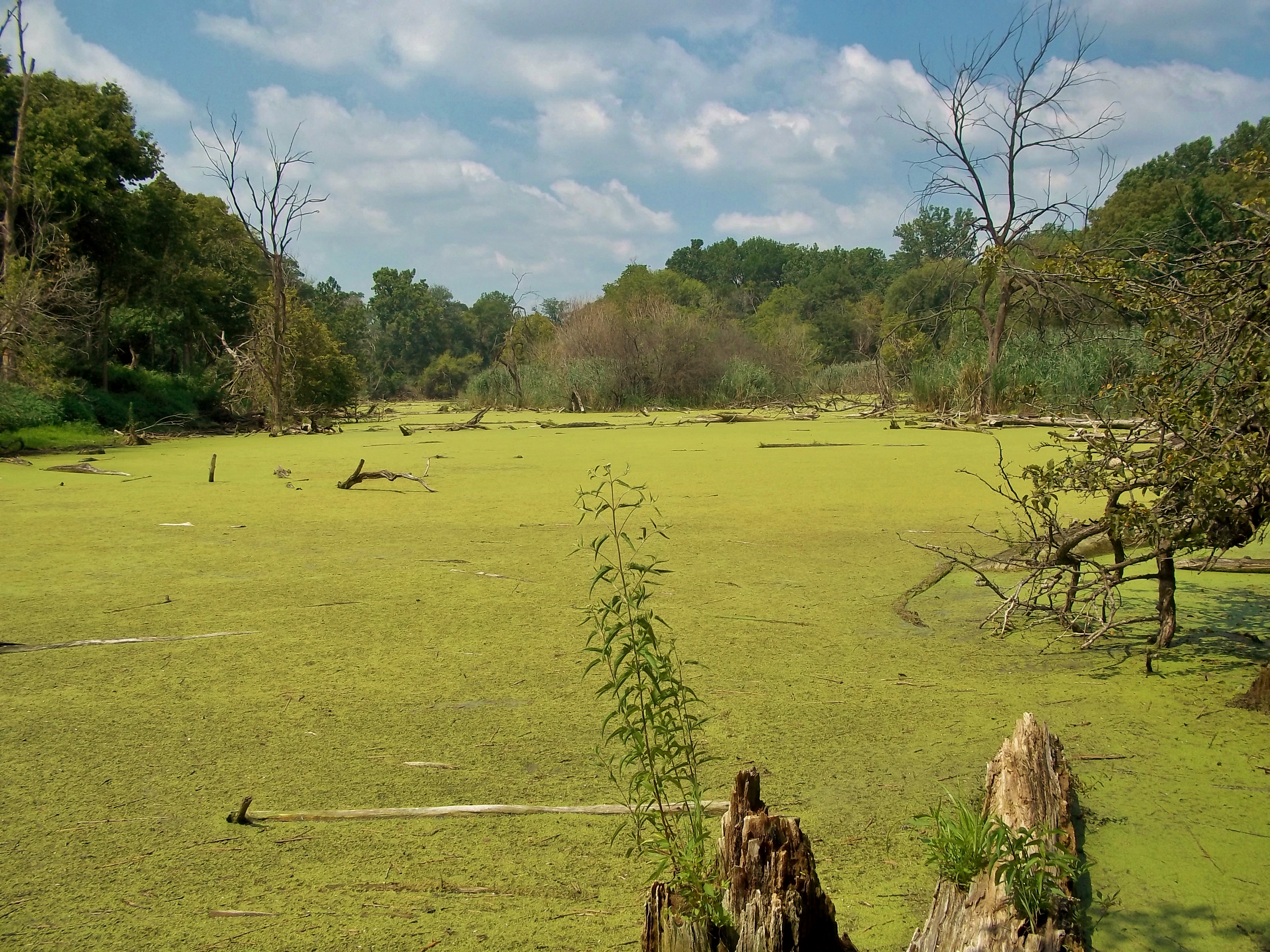
The waterway at the Portage Historic Site in August
