= Sauk Trail Woods =

Forest preserve in Cook County, Illinois, US

Coordinates: 41°28′57″N 87°39′32″W

Sauk Trail Woods are located within the Cook County Forest Preserves in Park Forest and Chicago Heights, Illinois. They are part of the Thorn Creek Trail System. They contain miles of paved bike trails and off-trail dirt paths. Sauk Trail Woods contains Sauk Lake and Thorn Creek. The topography is fairly hilly, featuring ravines and steep, eroded hillsides. The elevation is the highest on the outskirts of the preserve. Then, as one goes into the Thorn Creek River Valley, you descend steep hills and sandy bluffs. There is an abundance of ravines that have been cut by creeks flowing into the valley. Many of the ravines are surprisingly deep near the bottom of the valley. Most of the Sauk Trail Woods Preserve is covered by dense woods, however there are some open prairie areas. In the northwest section of the woods, there is a fairly large marsh, that is surrounded by thick pampas grass and shallow bogs. The woods are located on the Valparaiso Moraine, which accounts for the hilliness of the area. There are many parking lots with pavilions situated throughout the preserve.

== See also ==
- North Creek Woods
- Cook County Forest Preserves
- Ned Brown Forest Preserve
