= Huber Site =

Archaeological site in Illinois, United States

- Location in Illinois Location in United States
- 41°45′00″N 87°41′00″W
- Location: on Tinley Creek near Chicago, Illinois

Site notes
- Area: 10 acres (4.0 ha)

The Huber Site (11Ck-1) is located on Tinley Creek 2 miles west of Blue Island in Cook County, Illinois, near the city of Chicago. It is classified as a late prehistoric site with Upper Mississippian affiliation.

== History of archaeological investigations ==
The site was excavated under the auspices of the University of Chicago by W.C. Bennet, but no comprehensive site report was published. Further excavations took place in 1956 and in 1990 an analysis was published by the Illinois Department of Transportation and the Center for American Archaeology including data from both excavations.

== Results of data analysis ==
Excavations at the site yielded prehistoric artifacts, pit features, burials and animal bone.

=== Features ===
A total of 27 pit features were identified at the site. Some of these had ash and carbonized material within their fill, and are classified as fire pits. The remainder were classified as refuse pits.

=== Burials ===
Three “jumbled” burials (possibly an ossuary) were reported from the site. One of them was a child burial which contained grave goods in the form of copper ornaments (these ornaments were not among the artifacts presented in the site report).

=== Animal remains ===
Remains from several species were recovered from the site. The main species present were bowfin, turtle, beaver, deer, dog, elk, muskrat and raccoon. These remains were not modified into tools like the bone tools described in the Artifacts section below, and may be considered food remains or, in the case of the dog, the remains of ceremonial activities. Dog sacrifice and dog meat consumption was observed to have ceremonial and religious implications in early Native American tribes.

=== Artifacts ===
Artifacts recovered from the site included:

- Pottery - total of 6,077 sherds, almost all of it Huber ware (described below).
- Stone tools - including projectile points, scrapers, gravers, knives, and punches/awls. Of the projectile points, the most numerous category was the small triangular Madison point.
- Ground stone artifacts - including celts, axes, hammerstones/manos, smoking pipes, abraders, a paintstone made of ground limonite and a maul.
- Bone and antler tools - a wide variety of bone and antler tools were recovered from the site, including elk and bison scapula hoes, antler flakers, elk antler punches, and antler tine, matting needles, an antler digging tool, and bone and antler awls.
- Non-utilitarian bone artifacts - several items were recovered that were used for personal adornment or other social purposes, including a bone rasp (musical instrument), bone bracelet, bone tubes (possibly hair adornments), hair pins made from turkey long bones, a bone disc and an antler pendant. There was also a bone or antler dice or game piece.
- Shell artifacts - including spoons, scrapers, a gorget, pendant and bead.
- Metal artifacts - a small piece of sheet brass is a possible (but inconclusive) indicator of European presence at the site.

The non-pottery artifacts found at an archaeological site can provide useful cultural context as well as a glimpse into the domestic tasks performed at a site; ceremonial or religious activities; recreational activities; and clothing or personal adornment.

Some of the most prominent and diagnostic non-pottery artifacts are presented here in more detail. Due to copyright restrictions, images of the items cannot be shown, but links are provided to public domain images (when available) of similar items from other Upper Mississippian sites:

Material	Description	Image of similar artifact from another site	Qty	Function / use	Comments / associations
Chipped stone	Small triangular points (aka Madison points)	File:Fifield_projectile_points.jpeg	137	Hunting/fishing/warfare	Also known as “arrowheads”; are thought to be arrow-tips for bows-and-arrows. The usage of the bow-and-arrow seems to have greatly increased during the Late Woodland, probably as a result of increased conflict.
Chipped stone	Biface blades/knives	File:Griesmer_biface_knives.jpeg	8	Domestic function / cutting applications	Typical of Upper Mississippian sites, particularly Huber and Oneota (Orr focus)
Chipped stone	Humpback end scraper		65	Domestic function / processing wood or hides	Typical of Upper Mississippian sites, particularly Huber and Oneota (Orr focus)
Antler	Antler flakers		26	Domestic function / stone tool manufacture	These have also been recovered at the nearby Huber sites of Anker and Hoxie Farm
Antler	Socketed antler punches		8	Domestic function / stone tool manufacture	Also found at other late prehistoric sites in northern Illinois; different from the "flakers" in that they are socketed
Stone	Arrow shaft straightener	File:Griesmer_arrowshaft_straightener.jpeg	5 fragments	Domestic function / straightening arrow shafts for bows-and-arrows	Typical at Upper Mississippian sites
Antler	Antler projectile points		10 untanged; 7 expanding stem, 3 contracting stem	Hunting/fishing/warfare	The tanged or barbed type is characteristic of Fisher; the untanged type is more typical of Oneota
Bone	Scapula knives	File:Scapula_knife_or_scraper.jpeg	7	Domestic function / cutting applications	Also recovered from the Fisher site; the Huber specimens appear to be broken hoes that were refashioned as knives
Bone	Metapodial flesher (aka Deer cannon bone beamer)	File:Griesmer_deer_cannon_bone_beamer.jpeg	3	Domestic function / hide-working tool	Commonly found at Fisher and Langford sites
Bone	Scapula hoes	File:Fifield bison_scapula_hoe.jpeg	15 (12 elk, 3 bison)	Domestic function / Agricultural-horticultural or general digging tool	Common at Fisher and Oneota sites; they may have been used to dig out the pit features present at Huber.
Bone or Antler	Dice	File:Griesmer_antler_cylinder_game_pieces.jpeg	1	Entertainment function / gambling	These have been found at Fisher, Huber, Langford and Oneota (especially Grand River focus and Lake Winnebago focus) and may have been used in a gambling game. Gambling was noted to be a popular pastime among the early Native American tribes.
Bone	Matting needles		14	Domestic function / sewing mats and/or clothing	Common at other late prehistoric sites in northern Illinois
Bone	Bone awls		23	Domestic function / hide-working tool	Common at other late prehistoric sites in northern Illinois
Stone	Block-style pipe		3 fragments	Ceremonial-Recreational function / pipe smoking	This type was also found at the Anker site
Bone	Broken deer phalange		8	Possible entertainment function / "cup and pin" game	These were probably broken open to suck out the marrow and some researchers think they were also used in a game
Bone	Bone rasp (musical instrument)	File:Bone_rasp_(musical_instrument).jpeg	1	Ceremonial-Recreational function / entertainment or use at ceremony	Also found at other Huber sites as well as Whittlesey and Fort Ancient sites; the specimens at Huber was associated with a burial
Stone	Engraved pebbles		2	Art pieces / Religious function	These two engraved pebbles, one incised with a stick-man design and the other of an animal (probably a bison) with the design of an arrow/heart in its interior, are unique artifacts and may represent a connection to a group such as the Historic Midewiwin.

=== Upper Mississippian Huber pottery ===
Pottery sherds from the Huber Site

The Huber site is the type site for an Upper Mississippian culture known for its distinctive shell-tempered pottery. Although the Huber tradition was well known by archaeologists for decades following the original excavations, a formalized typology was not developed until Charles Faulkner devised one in his 1972 report on the Griesmer site in northwestern Indiana, just to the east of Chicago.

Huber pottery is characterized by shell-tempered, plain surface pots with globular vessel shape and restricted orifices with everted rims. Some vessels also have strap handles. Decoration (when present) usually consists of vertical or obliquely applied incised or trailed lines generally running from the lip to the shoulder. Rarely, surfaces are cordmarked or smoothed-over cordmarked. The top of the lip is either plain or decorated with fine to wide notching. A minority also have punctate decoration, usually in combination with the trailed lines.

18 different rim profile types were identified but almost all of them are everted, mostly sharply everted. The most common are everted with square lip; everted with the lip thickened on either the inside or outside; and everted with pointed lip. Almost half of the lips are unnotched. Of the body sherds showing incised lines, there were more fine-line incised lines than either medium- or wide-line.

Following Faulkner's typology, this is the proportion of the pottery types at the site:

- Huber Plain - 82%, characterized by a plain surface
- Huber Trailed - 9%, characterized by a plain surface decorated with fine incised lines
- Huber Bold - 5%, characterized by a plain surface decorated with wide lines, possibly finger-trailed
- Huber Cordmarked - 1%, characterized by a cordmarked surface
- Fisher - less than 1% of the pottery was identified as belonging to the Fisher tradition, another Upper Mississippian culture which existed in the southern Lake Michigan region and was at least partially coterminous with Huber. Fisher pottery is characterized by shell-tempering and predominantly cordmarked surfaces, often decorated with curvilinear designs.
- Other types - 2.5%

== Chronology of Huber pottery within the Huber sequence ==
The trends in certain pottery traits are very time-sensitive and can be used as indicators of relative age. Based on information on other Huber sites in the area, archaeologists have determined early Huber pottery is more likely to have cordmarked surface finish; wide-trailed decoration; and notched lips. Late Huber pottery has predominately smooth surface finish; fine-line incised decoration; and unnotched lips.

Temporal trends may be seen by a comparison to the nearby Hoxie Farm site. The pottery from the Huber site assemblage overwhelmingly has smooth surface with only 1% of sherds cordmarked; in contrast, Hoxie Farm's pottery was 23.5% cordmarked. 45% of incised decoration was fine-line incised, compared to 13% at Hoxie Farm. Also, almost 50% of lips are unnotched, compared to only 20% at Hoxie Farm. This indicates the Huber Site assemblage dates to a later time period than Hoxie Farm.

== Huber within the Upper Mississippian culture ==
Huber ware (and Huber culture) are often mentioned together with Fisher. Both Fisher and Huber are Upper Mississippian cultures which existed in the southern Lake Michigan region in the states of northern Illinois and Indiana and southwest Michigan. Both have shell-tempered pottery but Huber is predominantly plain surface with fine-line decoration and Fisher is predominantly cordmarked surface with wide-line decoration.

The relationship of Huber and Fisher both with each other and with other Upper Mississippian cultures in the area has long been a matter of debate and speculation among archaeologists. James Griffin, upon examining the artifacts from the original 1929 excavations, felt that Huber was a Component of the Oneota Aspect based on the form and design of the pottery, close to the Orr and Lake Winnebago foci, and that Fisher was part of a separate focus. Since that date, we’ve obtained a great deal more information and now we know that Fisher is the older of the two and Huber is the only one that has been found in association with early Historic European trade goods. Nevertheless, both Fisher and Huber coexist at the same sites seemingly at the same time. Hoxie Farm, Griesmer and Moccasin Bluff are examples of this.

Most archaeologists now believe that both Fisher and Huber are taxonomically related phases within the Oneota tradition. The relationship between the two is time-related in that Huber is derived from Fisher; but there are also late Fisher sites like Fifield, where Fisher pottery is associated with late Prehistoric artifacts, so it is possible that Fisher also survived until the Protohistoric or early Historic period.

== Significance ==
The Huber site has had an outsized influence in archaeological circles, especially in the American Midwest, as the namesake of an Upper Mississippian culture. Several of the artifacts are also noteworthy:

Several items of personal adornment and domestic utility were found here, and provide a glimpse into daily life; such as hair accessories, bracelets, pendants, and hoes made of bison and elk scapulas. A bone or antler dice implies games or gambling went on at the site. A bone rasp indicates music was being performed for entertainment or for ceremonial purposes.

There was no direct evidence of cultivated plants at Huber, but that is probably due to the fact that plant remains were not systematically collected during excavations. The fact that there are hoes made of bison scapula and elk scapula is indirect evidence of agricultural activities. Furthermore, cultivated corn remains have been found at other Huber sites such as Hoxie Farm, so there is no doubt the Huber society was agriculturally based.

Based on the type of animal bone present, and the presence of agricultural implements such as the scapula hoes, the researchers felt that the site was occupied at least from spring through fall.

The engraved pebbles found at Huber are an indication of the Native Americans belief in the spirit world. Early observers of the Ojibwe Midewiwin Society reported that similar engravings were made in birch-bark before a hunt in the belief that drawing the animal would facilitate the hunter's success.

There are several Huber sites in the Chicago and northwest Indiana area; besides Huber itself, there are Hoxie Farm, Oak Forest, Anker, Bowmanville and Griesmer. It is thought that these sites formed a settlement system which included large villages and smaller sites used for ceremonial and mortuary purposes. Huber may be one of the ceremonial/mortuary sites due to several factors:

- Burials were found there
- Dog bone was present; dog sacrifice and dog meat consumption had ceremonial implications in Great Lakes Native American society
- Several of the artifacts had possible religious connotations, such as the bone rasp, the personal adornment items and especially the engraved pebbles
