= Forest Preserve District of Cook County =

Public land management agency in Illinois

- Seal of the Forest Preserve District of Cook County

- FPDCC general headquarters in River Forest, Illinois in 2026
- Formation: 1914; 112 years ago
- Type: Special district
- Headquarters: River Forest, Illinois
- Coordinates: 41°53′23.3″N 87°48′20.5″W
- Region served: Cook County
- Main organ: Cook County Board of Commissioners
- Website: https://fpdcc.com

The Forest Preserve District of Cook County is a governmental commission in Cook County, Illinois, that owns and manages land containing forest, prairie, wetland, streams, and lakes. These land holdings are primarily managed as undeveloped natural areas and for outdoor recreation. The Forest Preserve District encompasses approximately 70,000 acres (110 mi^{2}; 280 km^{2}) of land or approximately 11% of the land in Cook County, which contains the city of Chicago and is the most densely populated urban metropolitan area in the Midwest. The Forest Preserves also owns the lands on which the Brookfield Zoo and the Chicago Botanic Garden operate, and its Chicago Portage area preserve is also affiliated with the United States National Park Service.

The Cook County Board of Commissioners also serves ex-officio as the board for the district. The Forest Preserve District headquarters is located in River Forest, Illinois.

== Background ==
Forest preserves serve a different purpose than urban parks and are typically maintained for the conservation and restoration of habitat. Forest preserves may contain nature centers and other facilities, picnic groves, and hiking, biking, and equestrian trails, but, apart from public golf courses, do not typically contain land set aside for other sports activities.

The forest preserves are administered by the Forest Preserve District of Cook County, which operates within a special purpose taxation district across municipal boundaries. While the Forest Preserve District as a unit of government is legally separate from Cook County, the Cook county board of commissioners, the county board president, and county clerk hold the same offices ex officio concurrently, making up the Forest Preserve District Board of Commissioners.

== History ==
In 1905, at the instigation of the Cook County Board of Commissioners and private nature groups (partly guided by prominent landscape architect Jens Jensen), Illinois attempted to pass a forest preserve act, but the act was not signed by the governor. The Forest Preserve District Association was formed in 1911 after a new state law was adopted in 1909; however, the Illinois courts declared the law unconstitutional in 1911. In 1913, Illinois adopted the Cook County Forest Preserve District Act that was signed by the governor and survived legal challenge. The 1913 law allowed a county board:

To acquire… and hold lands… containing one or more natural forests or lands connecting such forests or parts thereof, for the purpose of protecting and preserving the flora, fauna and scenic beauties within such district, and to restore, restock, protect, and preserve the natural forests and said lands together with their flora and fauna, as nearly as may be, in their natural state and condition, for the purpose of the education, pleasure, and recreation of the public.

A Cook County referendum required by the 1913 law was passed by voters in 1914, establishing the Forest Preserve District of Cook County, and the first Board meeting was held in February 1915.

== Operations ==
The Forest Preserve District operates six nature centers used for programming and education, five campgrounds, and three swimming centers as of 2023. The District's oldest nature center is in a preserved rural one-room schoolhouse built in 1886 and is located in the Palos Division. The Forest Preserve District also maintains ten public golf courses. In addition to owning and managing tens of thousands of acres of forest, meadow, and wetlands, both the Brookfield Zoo (managed by Chicago Zoological Society under an agreement with the District) and the Chicago Botanic Gardens (managed by the Chicago Horticultural Society) are located on district land. In 2016, a tree-top zipline course was opened in west Cook County's Bemis Woods.

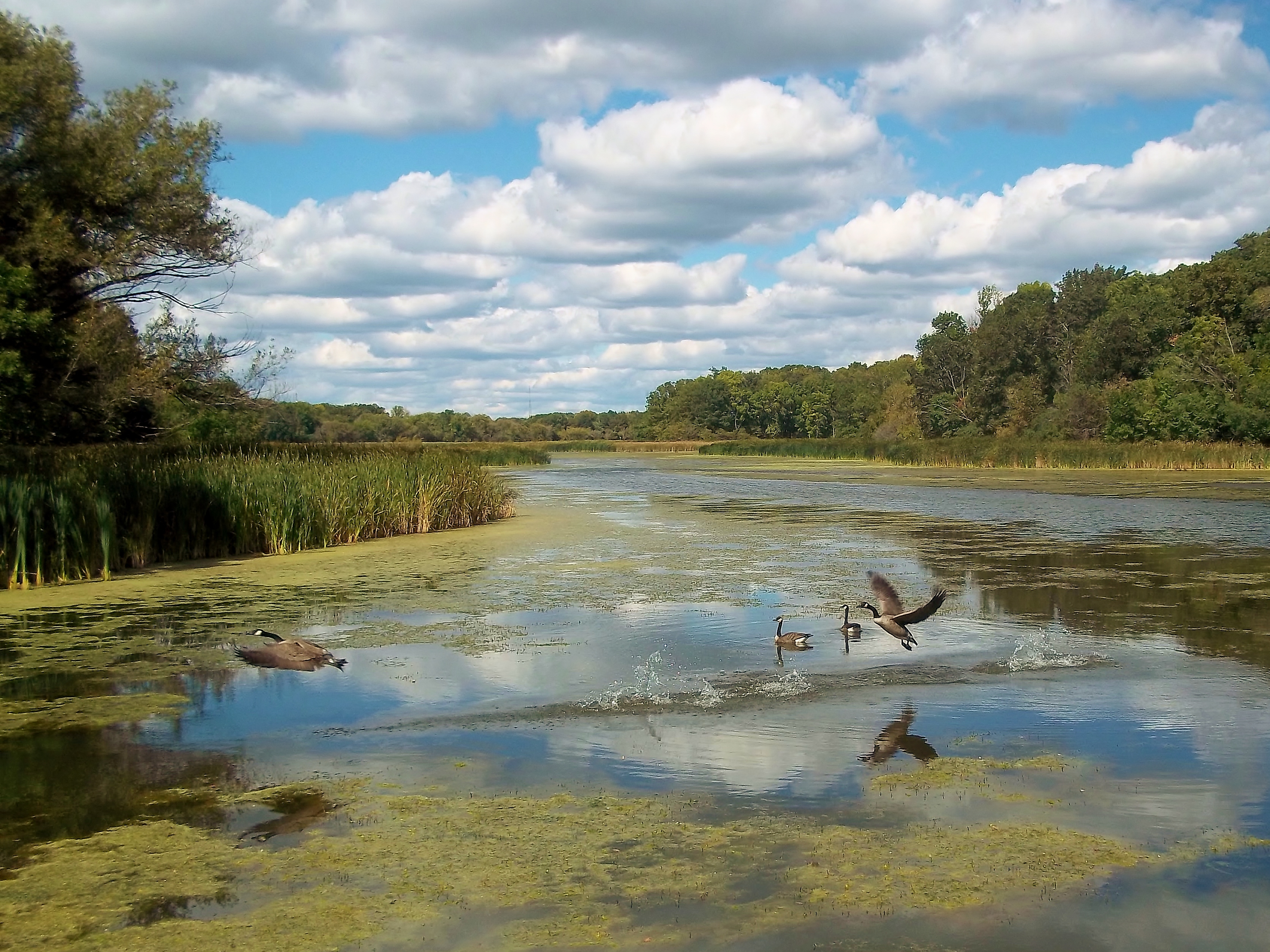
Canada geese on Salt Creek looking toward Busse Woods

Eight significant waterways flow, at least in part, through lands in the Forest Preserve District: the Chicago River, the Des Plaines River, the Little Calumet River, Salt Creek, Poplar Creek, Thorn Creek, Crooked Creek, and Tinley Creek.

=== National sites ===
The Ned Brown Forest Preserve contains Busse Woods, a National Natural Landmark. The District also administers the Chicago Portage National Historic Site. In addition, the District's Red Gate Woods was the war-time home of the Manhattan Project's first nuclear facility.

=== Conservation ===
A team of district biologists and resource management professionals monitor wildlife and plants (including invasive species), water quality, and other features within the district. Monitoring may include counting population numbers and tracking the presence of animals across the district and assessing habitat needs for rare species. Through monitoring, it was discovered that river otters had returned to the district after nearly a century of absence.

The Forest Preserve District owns 22 sites containing high-quality conservation resources that have been designated as Illinois Nature Preserves ensuring increased management and protection.

The International Dark-Sky Association (IDA) conservation program designated the Forest Preserve District's Palos Preserves an Urban Night Sky Place. After review, the IDA determined that within the context of its substantial urban setting, the preserve's "planning and design actively promote an authentic nighttime experience in the midst of significant artificial light."

=== Trail systems ===
There are thirteen trail systems within the Forest Preserve District:

- Arie Crown Forest trail system
- Burnham Greenway trail system
- Busse Woods bicycle trail
- Centennial and I&M Canal trail system
- Deer Grove trail system
- Des Plaines River Trail system
- North Branch Trail system
- Palos Trail system
- Poplar Creek trail system
- Sag Valley trail system
- Salt Creek trail system
- Thorn Creek trail system
- Tinley Creek trail system

== Facilities by region ==
=== Region 1: Northwest Cook County ===
Poplar Creek Division

Includes: Spring Lake Preserve, Crabtree Preserve, Arthur L. Janura Preserve

Activity Areas · Barrington Road Pond · Beverly Lake · Bluff Springs Fen · Bode East · Bode Lake · Crabtree Nature Center · Great Egret Family Picnic Area · Old Stover Trailhead · Penny Road Pond · Poplar Creek Bicycle Lot · Poplar Creek Equestrian Parking · Poplar Creek Model Airplane Flying Field · Shoe Factory Road Woods · Spring Creek Valley Headwaters · Spring Lake Nature Preserve

Trail Systems · Crabtree Preserve (Paved) · Poplar Creek (Paved) · Poplar Creek (Unpaved) · Spring Lake (Unpaved)

=== Region 2: Northwest Cook County ===
Northwest Division

Includes: Deer Grove Preserve, Jens Jensen Preserve, Paul Douglas Preserve, Ned Brown Preserve (Busse Woods)

Activity Areas · Baker's Lake Overlook · Baker's Lake Younghusband Prairie · Busse Forest-Central · Busse Forest-North · Busse Forest-South · Busse Forest-West · Busse Forest Elk Pasture · Busse Forest Main Dam · Busse Lake Beisner Road Access · Busse Lake Boating Center · Camp Alphonse · Camp Reinberg · Deer Grove · Deer Grove-East · Deer Grove-West · Deer Grove Lake · Grassy Ridge Meadow · Highland Woods Driving Range · Highland Woods Golf Course · Ned Brown Meadow · Woodland Meadow

Trail Systems · Busse Forest (Paved) · Deer Grove (Paved) · Deer Grove (Unpaved) · Paul Douglas (Paved)

=== Region 3: North Cook County ===
Indian Boundary Division, Des Plaines Division

Includes: Seymour Simon Preserve

Activity Areas · Allison Woods · Axehead Lake · Beck Lake · Belleau Lake · Big Bend Lake · Blandings Grove Family Picnic Area · Blue Beach Family Picnic Area · Camp Baden Powell · Camp Dan Beard · Camp Ground Road Woods · Camp Pine Woods · Catherine Chevalier Woods · Che-Che-Pin-Qua Woods · Chippewa Woods · Dam No. 1 Woods-East · Dam No. 1 Woods-West · Dam No. 2 Woods · Dam No. 4 Woods-East · Evans Field · Fullerton Woods · Fullerton Woods Family Picnic Area · Harry H. Semrow Driving Range · Indian Boundary Family Picnic Area · Indian Boundary Golf Course · Iroquois Woods · Irving Park Road Canoe Landing · Jerome Huppert Woods · John E. Traeger Family Picnic Area · Kloempken Prairie · Lake Avenue Woods-East · Lake Avenue Woods-West · Lions Woods · Massasauga Family Picnic Area · Northwestern Woods · Potawatomi Lake · Potawatomi Woods · River Bend Family Picnic Area · River Trail Nature Center · Robinson Homestead Family Picnic Area · Robinson Woods-South · Schiller Model Airplane Flying Field · Schiller Playfield · Schiller Pond · Schiller Woods-East · Schiller Woods-South · Schiller Woods-West · Sunset Bridge Meadow

Trail System · Des Plaines (Unpaved)

=== Region 4: North Cook County ===
North Branch Division, Skokie Division

Includes: William N. Erickson Preserves, George F. Nixon Forest, Frank Bobrytzke Forest, Clayton F. Smith Preserves, Roman Pucinski Preserve

Activity Areas · Billy Caldwell Golf Course · Blue Star Memorial Woods · Bunker Hill · Caldwell Woods · Calvin R. Sutker Grove · Camp Adahi · Camp Glenview · Chick Evans Golf Course · Chipilly Woods · Edgebrook Golf Course · Edgebrook Woods · Erickson Woods · Forest Glen Woods · Forest Way Grove · Glen Grove Equestrian Center · Glenview Woods · Harms Woods-Central · Harms Woods-North · Harms Woods-South · Irene C. Hernandez Family Picnic Area · LaBagh Woods · Linne Woods · Little House of Glencoe · Mary Mix McDonald Woods · Mathew Bieszczat–Volunteer Resource Center · Miami Woods · Perkins Woods · St. Paul Woods · Sidney Yates Flatwoods · Skokie Lagoons · Somme Nature Preserve · Somme Prairie Grove · Somme Woods · Thaddeus S. "Ted" Lechowicz Woods · Tower Road · Tower Road Boat Launch · Turnbull Woods · Watersmeet Woods · Wayside Woods · Whealan Pool Aquatic Center

Special Activity Site · Chicago Botanic Garden

Trail Systems · North Branch (Paved) · North Branch (Unpaved)

=== Region 5: West Cook County ===
Salt Creek Division

Activity Areas · Andrew Toman Grove · Bemis Woods-North · Bemis Woods-South · Brezina Woods · Brookfield Woods · Callahan Grove · Cermak Family Aquatic Center · Cermak Quarry · Cermak Woods · Cummings Square (General Headquarters) · G.A.R. Woods · Hal Tyrrell Trailside Museum · LaGrange Park Woods · Maywood Grove · McCormick Woods · Meadowlark Golf Course · Miller Meadow-North · Miller Meadow-South · National Grove-North · National Grove-South · Ottawa Trail Woods-North · Ottawa Trail Woods-South · Plank Road Meadow Boat Launch · Possum Hollow Woods · Quercus Woods Family Picnic Area · Salt Creek Woods · Schuth's Grove · Silver Creek Family Picnic Area · Stony Ford Canoe Landing · Thatcher Woods · Thatcher Woods Glen · Thomas Jefferson Woods · Twenty-Sixth Street Woods-East · Twenty-Sixth Street Woods-West · Westchester Woods · White Eagle Woods-North · White Eagle Woods-South · Wolf Road Prairie · Zoo Woods

Trail Systems · Salt Creek (Paved) · Salt Creek (Unpaved) · Salt Creek Greenway (Paved)

Special Activity Sites · Brookfield Zoo · Chicago Portage National Historic Site

=== Region 6: Southwest Cook County ===
Salt Creek Division, Palos Division

Includes: Palos Preserves

Activity Areas · Arie Crown Forest · Belly Deep Slough · Buffalo Woods-Central · Buffalo Woods Family Picnic Area · Buffalo Woods-North · Buffalo Woods-South · Bullfrog Lake · Camp Kiwanis Equestrian Staging Area · Columbia Woods · Country Lane Woods · Cranberry Slough · Crawdad Slough · Crooked Creek Woods · Dan McMahon Woods · Henry De Tonty Woods · Hickory Hills Woods · Hidden Pond Woods-East · Hidden Pond Woods-West · Joe's Pond · John Husar I&M Canal–Bicycle Trail Parking Lot · Lake Ida · Little Red Schoolhouse Nature Center · Maple Lake Boating Center · Maple Lake-East · Maple Lake · Maple Lake Overlook · Morrill Meadow · Palos Fen · Paw Paw Woods · Pioneer Woods · Pulaski Woods · Pulaski Woods-East · Pulaski Woods-South–Mountain Bike Staging Area · Red Gate Woods · Saganashkee Slough-Central · Saganashkee Slough-East · Saganashkee Slough Boat Launch · Spears Woods · Sundown Meadow · Theodore Stone Forest · Tuma Lake · White Oak Woods · Willow Springs Woods · Wolf Road Woods

Trail Systems · Arie Crown (Unpaved) · Centennial (Unpaved) · John Husar I&M Canal (Paved) · Palos (Unpaved)

=== Region 7: Southwest Cook County ===
Sag Valley Division

Includes: Black Partridge Preserve, Cap Sauer's Preserve, John J. Duffy Preserve, Edward M. Sneed Forest

Activity Areas · Bergman Slough · Black Partridge Woods · Cap Sauers Holding · Cherry Hill Woods · Forty Acre Woods · Horsetail Lake · McGinnis Slough · McClaughrey Spring Woods · Orland Grassland · Orland Grove · Paddock Woods · Palos Park Woods-North · Palos Park Woods-South · Papoose Lake · Sag Quarries · Sagawau Environmental Learning Center · Southland Volunteer Resource Center · Swallow Cliff Woods-North · Swallow Cliff Woods-South · Tampier Greenway Family Picnic Area · Tampier Lake Boating Center · Tampier Lake-North · Tampier Lake-West · Teason's Woods

Trail Systems · Centennial (Unpaved) · Sag Valley (Unpaved)

=== Region 8: South Cook County ===
Tinley Creek Division

Includes: South Green Belt Preserve

Activity Areas · Arrowhead Lake · Bachelor's Grove Woods · Bartel Grassland · Bobolink Family Picnic Area · Bremen Grove · Bur Oak Woods · Camp Falcon · Camp Sullivan · Carlson Springs Woods · Catalina Grove Family Picnic Area · Coopers Hawk Grove Family Picnic Area · Elizabeth A. Conkey Forest-North · Elizabeth A. Conkey Forest-South · Flossmoor Road Bicycle Lot · George W. Dunne National Driving Range · George W. Dunne National Golf Course · Goeselville Grove Family Picnic Area · Midlothian Meadows · Midlothian Reservoir · Rubio Woods · St. Mihiel Woods-East · Tinley Creek Model Airplane Flying Field · Tinley Creek Woods · Turtlehead Lake · Vollmer Road Grove · Yankee Woods

Trail Systems · Tinley Creek (Paved) · Tinley Creek (Unpaved)

=== Region 9: Southeast Cook County ===
Calumet Division, Thorn Creek Division

Includes: Plum Creek Preserve; Powderhorn Prairie and Marsh Naure Preserve

Activity Areas · Beaubien Woods · Beaubien Woods Boat Launch · Brownell Woods · Burnham Prairie Nature Preserve · Burnham Woods Golf Course · Calumet City Playfield · Calumet City Prairie · Calumet Woods · Clayhole Woods · Dan Ryan Woods-91st Street · Dan Ryan Woods-Central · Dan Ryan Woods-East · Dan Ryan Woods-North · Dan Ryan Woods-South · Dan Ryan Woods-West · Dixmoor Playfield · Eggers Grove · Flatfoot Lake · Glenwood Woods-North · Glenwood Woods-South · Green Lake Family Aquatic Center · Green Lake Woods · Indian Hill Woods · Joe Louis "The Champ" Golf Course · Joe Orr Woods · Jurgensen Woods · Kickapoo Woods · King's Grove · Lansing Woods · Little Calumet Boat Launch · Michael J. O'Malley Preserve · North Creek Meadow · Plum Creek Play Meadow · Powderhorn Lake · River Oaks Golf Course · Sand Ridge Nature Center · Sand Ridge Prairie Nature Preserve · Sauk Lake · Sauk Trail Woods-Central · Sauk Trail Woods-East · Sauk Trail Woods-North · Sauk Trail Woods-South · Schubert's Woods · Shabbona Woods · Sweet Woods · Thorn Creek Model Airplane Flying Field · Thornton-Lansing Road–Nature Preserve (Zander Woods) · Wampum Lake · Wentworth Prairie · Whistler Woods · Woodrow Wilson Woods

Trail Systems · Burnham Greenway (Paved) · Major Taylor (Paved) · Plum Creek (Unpaved) · Thorn Creek (Paved) · Thorn Creek (Unpaved)

== See also ==
- Chicago Portage National Historic Site
- Illinois Nature Preserves
- Red Gate Woods
- North Creek Woods
- Sauk Trail Woods
- Schiller Woods magic water pump
