= Thorn Creek =

Physical characteristics
- Source
  - location: Will County near University Park, Illinois
  - coordinates: 41°26′08″N 87°43′03″W
  - elevation: 765 ft (233 m)
- Mouth
  - location: Confluence with the Little Calumet River, South Holland, Illinois
  - coordinates: 41°35′38″N 87°34′26″W
  - elevation: 581 ft (177 m)
- Length: 21 mi (34 km)

Basin features
- Progression: Thorn Creek → Little Calumet → Calumet → Lake Michigan → Great Lakes → Saint Lawrence Seaway → Gulf of Saint Lawrence
- GNIS ID: 419680

Thorn Creek is a 20.8-mile-long (33.5 km) tributary of the Little Calumet River that travels through Will and Cook counties in northeastern Illinois just south of Chicago. It starts in the high land of the Valparaiso Moraine before dropping 200 feet (60 m) to the lower elevations of the Little Calumet River valley. Along its path it has cut many deep ravines and valleys. It is usually quite narrow, though the width of the river varies. Under 26th Street in Chicago Heights, a dam built in 1928 forms Sauk Lake (which is very wide), but just north of the street it is just a few feet across. This dam creates an accumulation of several feet of silt in Sauk Lake and is being considered for Notching in 2016 by the Corps of Engineers. The intent is to 'improve stream habitat'. The impact upon Ground Water Recharge, mitigation of Thorn Creek's 'flashiness' and future recreational activities are also concerns of Water-Shed Stakeholders.

== See also ==
- Thorn Creek Nature Center and Preserve
- Sauk Trail Woods
- Calumet River
- Valparaiso Moraine
- Tinley Moraine
- List of rivers in Illinois
