= A. Evelyn Newman =

American educator

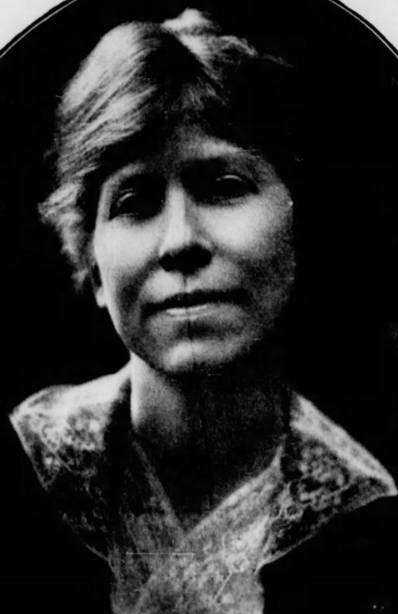
- A. Evelyn Newman, from a 1920 publication
- Born: January 8, 1881; Jefferson County, Kentucky
- Died: November 27, 1969 (aged 88); San Diego, California
- Occupations: Writer, educator, peace activist

Anna Evelyn Newman (January 8, 1881 – November 27, 1969) was an American educator, writer and peace activist. She was one of the American delegates to the 1915 meeting of the International Congress of Women, held at The Hague. She was Dean of Women at Colorado State Teachers College from 1923 to 1929, and elected chair of the National Association of Deans of Women in 1927. She taught English at Rollins College in Florida from 1931 to 1939.

== Early life and education ==
Newman was born in Jefferson County, Kentucky. She trained as a teacher, and was a student of Anna J. Hamilton. She earned a bachelor's degree and a master's degree from the University of Chicago. In 1929, she completed a doctorate at Trinity College Dublin. She also attended courses at Oxford, and at the University of Geneva.

== Career ==
=== Education ===
Newman taught English and sociology courses at the Minnesota State Normal School in Moorhead. From 1923 to 1929, she was Dean of Women at Colorado State Teachers College, where she also taught beginning in 1920. In 1926 she led a group of American students on a study tour in Europe. She was elected chair of the National Association of Deans of Women in 1927. From 1931 to 1939, she taught English and international relations at Rollins College in Florida. In 1939 she returned to Colorado, as head of the English department at the renamed Colorado State College of Education in Greeley.

=== Peace and international work ===
Newman lived in New York during the 1910s. She was general secretary and head resident of the Studio Club of New York, and was secretary of the Woman's Peace Party of New York City, and one of the American delegates to the 1915 meeting of the International Congress of Women, held at the Hague. She was an active member of the New York Peace Society. From 1917 to 1919, she worked at a YMCA canteen for American soldiers in France, and wrote about the war for American periodicals. She also wrote poetry, and gave lectures on world peace and other international issues. In 1946, she represented the AAUW at the World UNESCO meeting in Paris.

== Publications ==
Newman wrote articles for American magazines including Ladies' Home Journal Carry On, and The Survey, and for professional publications including The High School Teacher, Quarterly Journal of Speech, Educational Review, The Emerson Quarterly, and Pi Lambda Theta Journal.

- "Scenes from a Canteeneer's Life in France" (1919)
- "The Silent Voices" (1919)
- "The Doughboys' Girl in France" (1920)
- "America's Argonauts and their Golden Fleece" (1920)
- "Yanks and Princesses: A Story of the New Democracy" (1920)
- "A Plea for Tolerance" (1920)
- "'Doing' the Battlefields" (1924)
- "Keep Me From Petty Thought" (1924, poem)
- "The Opening Session of the League of Nations" (1925)
- "Peace on Earth, Good Will to Men" (1926)
- "Student Living Conditions and their Effects on Character and Morals" (1926)
- "Travel for Teachers" (1927)
- "Heloise in Springtime" (1928, poem)
- "The Sphinx of the Louvre" (1928, poem)
- "Conserving Spiritual Values in this Crisis" (1943)
- "Public Affairs: Sixth Delegate Assembly of WOTP" (1952)

== Personal life ==
In retirement Newman traveled and lectured extensively, including trips to Greece, the Middle East, the Soviet Union, and nine African nations. She died in San Diego, California in 1969, at the age of 88.
