= Una B. Herrick =

American educator

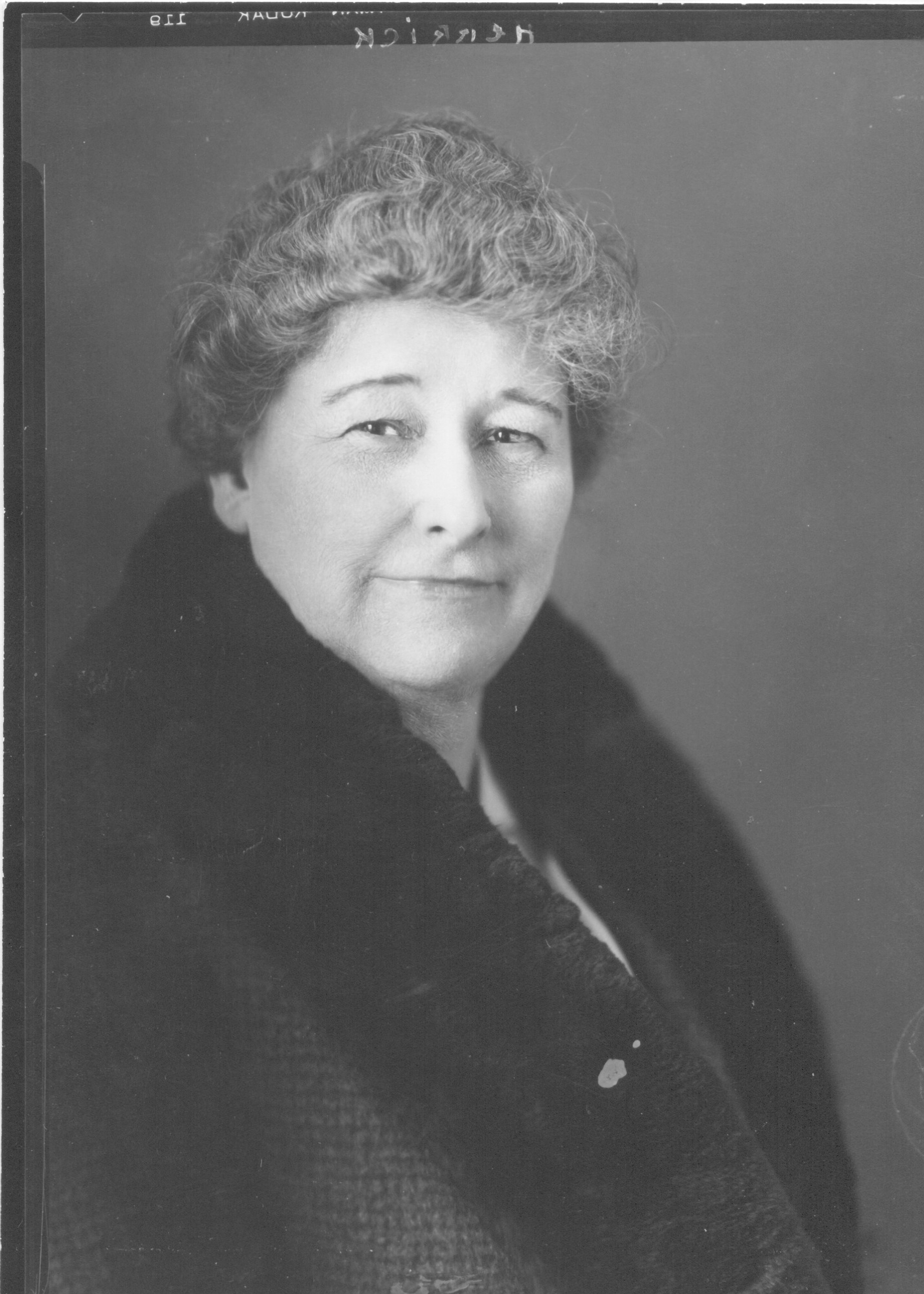
Una B. Herrick, Merrill G. Burlingame Special Collections, Montana State University Library

Una Brasfield Herrick (August 24, 1863 – August 10, 1950) was an American academic. A pioneer in higher education for women, she was the first Dean of Women at Montana State College (now Montana State University).

== Early life ==
Una Olive Brasfield was born on August 24, 1863, in Madison County, Kentucky, the daughter of James Madison Brasfield (1814–1903) and Narcissa Catherine Haynes (1832–1917).

== Career ==
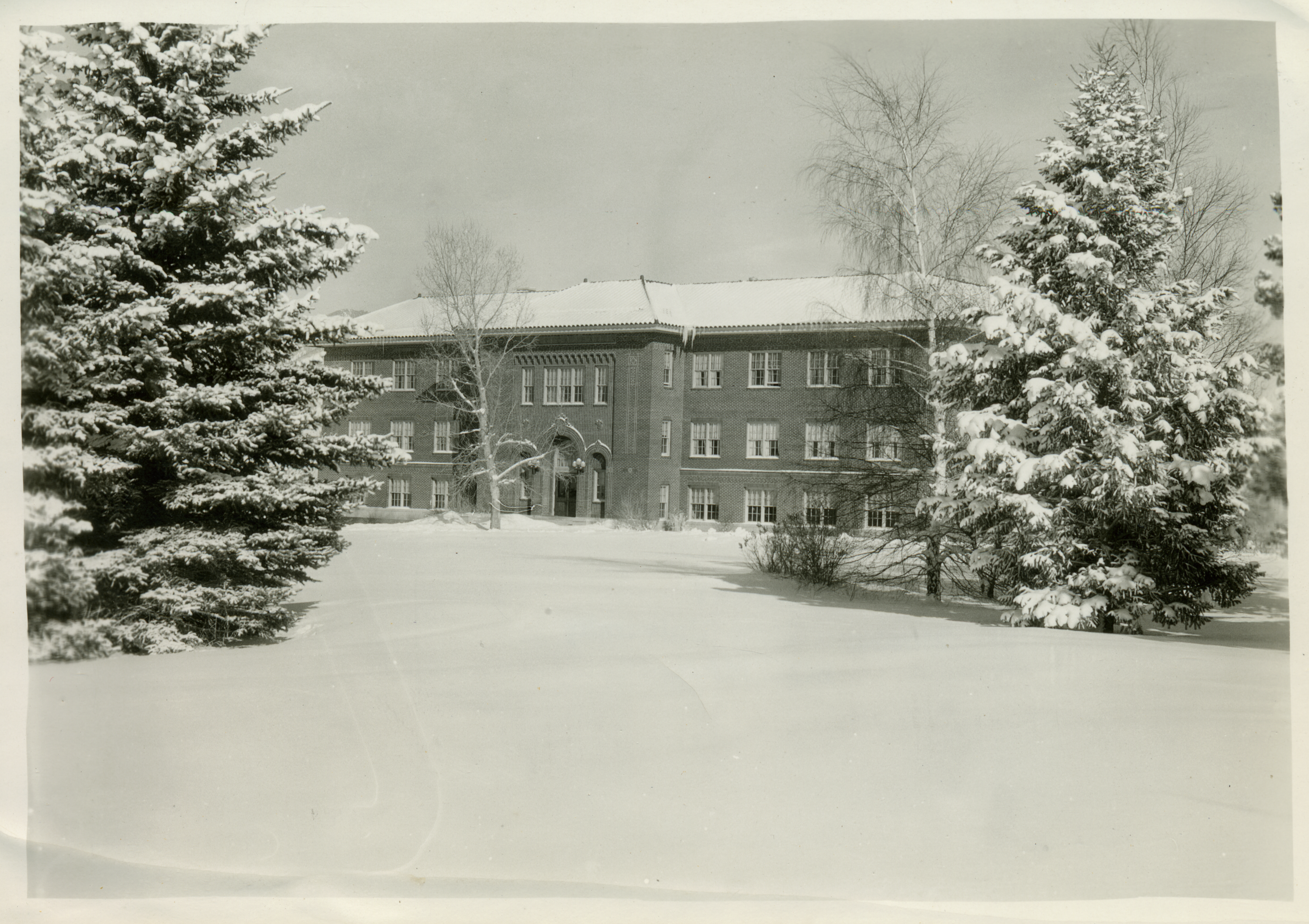
Herrick Hall in the snow, 1933

Una B. Herrick was Dean of Women, professor of Physical Education for Women, Director of Physical Education for Women & Vocational Guidance Advisor at Montana State College. From 1911 to 1932, she was the Dean of the College of Household and Industrial Arts and later the first Dean of Women at Montana State College. She was called a "trailblazer in a frontier college who made a place for women on this men's college campus". She was on the membership committee of the National Association of Deans of Women and was member of the Deans of Women Western Conference. She then became director of Hamilton Hall, at Herrick's time the women's dormitory.

In 1926, Montana State College built Herrick Hall to house the Home Economics Department; the building was named after Dean Herrick. Herrick Hall was the first building at MSU to be dedicated immediately after completion.

Herrick has been recognized as the one to make a place for women in a college campus of men. She encouraged women to develop skills that would be useful for them to be financially independent. She organized the Girl's Vocational Congress, later High School Week, to help women explore career opportunities, and organized the Women's League, later merged into Associated Women Students.

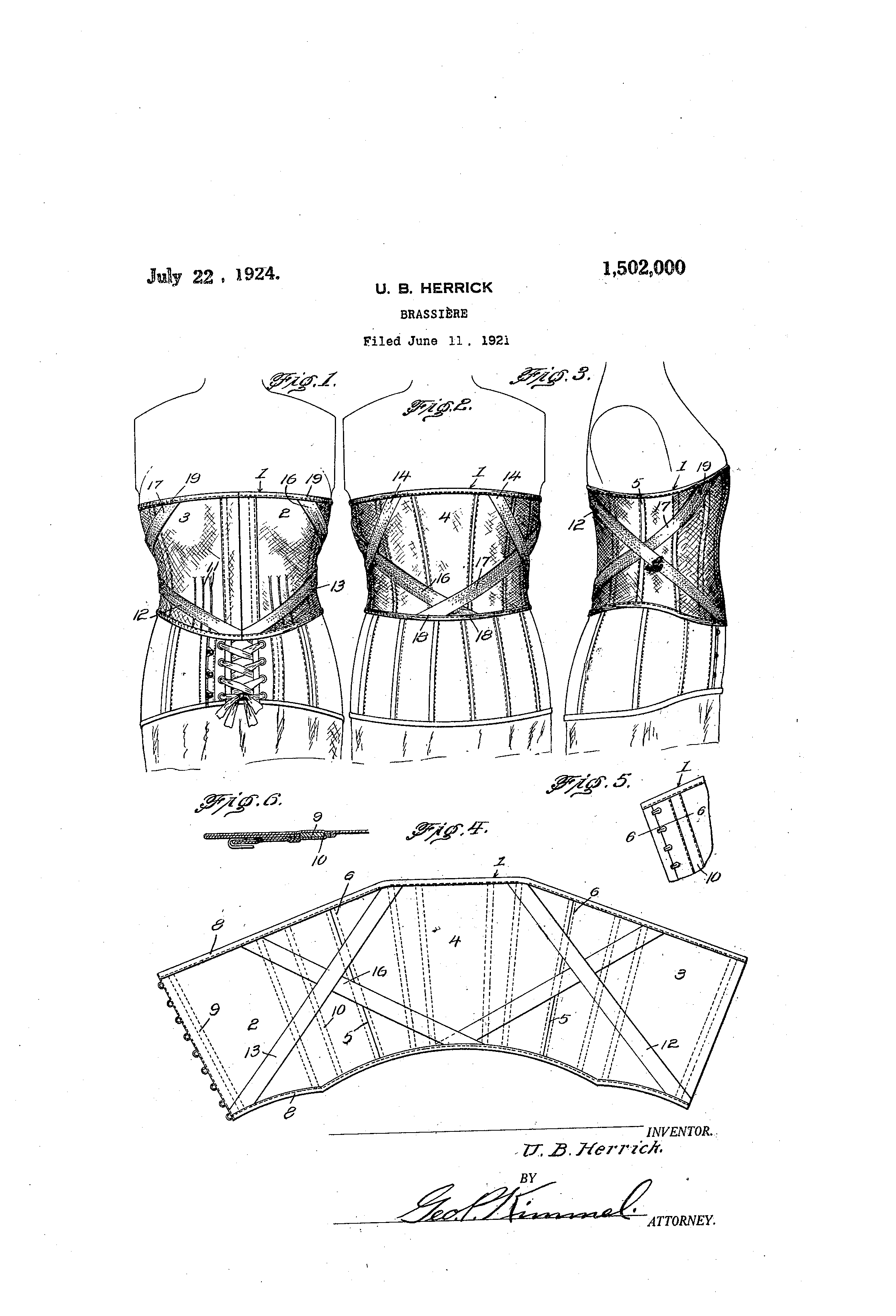
Brassiere US1502000-0

In 1921, Herrick patented a brassiere that snugly fit the wearer and was retained in proper position without the use of shoulder straps. The garment supported the figure and permitted freedom of movement of the arms and body without being displaced by those same movements.

Herrick wrote Twenty Years at Montana State University.

Herrick was a member of the United Daughters of the Confederacy, an organization of women who were proud of their Confederate heritage. She was also a member of the State Federation of Women's Clubs, the Daughters of the American Revolution, the American Federation of Arts, the National Home Economics Association and the State Home Economics Association.

== Personal life ==
On February 20, 1895, in New York City, Una Brasfield married Dr. Clinton Granger Herrick (died August 24, 1901). They had one daughter, Harriet (born 1900), later Callaway.

Herrick moved to Montana in 1911 and lived at Montana State College in Bozeman. She died on August 10, 1950, in Compton, California.

== Legacy ==
Montana State University instituted the Una B. Herrick Award, the second highest award recognized during Women's Day.
