= Lillias MacDonald =

American educator

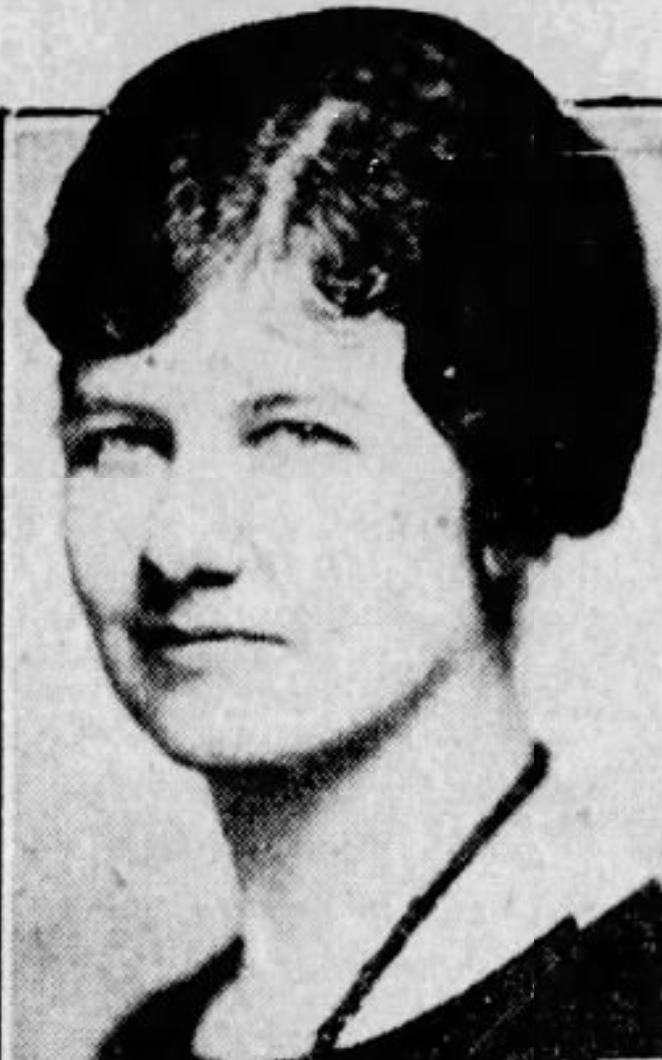
- Lillias MacDonald, from a 1927 newspaper
- Born: November 25, 1885; Buffalo, New York, U.S.
- Died: August 27, 1961 (age 75); Buffalo, New York, U.S.
- Education: Oberlin College
- Occupations: Dean of Women, physical education professor

Lillias M. MacDonald (November 25, 1885 – August 27, 1961) was an American educator. She established the physical education program at the University of Buffalo, and was the school's first dean of women, an office she held from 1922 to 1952.

== Early life and education ==
MacDonald was born in Buffalo, New York, the daughter of John MacDonald and Lillias MacKay MacDonald. Her parents were both born in Scotland; her father was a carpenter. She graduated from Oberlin College in 1908.

== Career ==
MacDonald taught physical education in Buffalo schools and with the YWCA. In 1922, she was appointed Dean of Women and assistant professor of hygiene at the University of Buffalo. She was the school's first dean of women, and established a physical education program at the school. She retired from teaching in 1948, and retired from the deanship in 1952. She worked in the university's office of alumni relations from 1952 to 1956. "I have been a very fortunate woman," she said in 1952. "I have had the fun of holding what I consider the nicest job in the world." In 1933, the school enrolled 234 female students; in 1952, the school counted over 900 female students. The school's first dormitory, MacDonald Residence Hall, was named in her honor.

MacDonald was a national officer of the National Association of Deans of Women, and an active member of the League of Women Voters, the Girl Scouts of the USA, and the American Association of University Women (AAUW). She served on the President's Committee of Fifty on College Hygiene. She spoke to community groups about women's education.

== Death ==
MacDonald died in 1961, at the age of 75, in Buffalo.
