= Anne Dudley (disambiguation) =

Anne Dudley (born 1956), is an English composer and musician.

Anne Dudley may also refer to:

- Anne Dallas Dudley (1876–1955), activist in the women's suffrage movement in the US
- Anne Dudley, Countess of Warwick (died 1588), née Anne Seymour, writer and daughter of Edward Seymour, Lord Protector of England
- Anne Dudley, Countess of Warwick (died 1604), (1548/1549–1604), lady-in-waiting to Elizabeth I and wife of Ambrose Dudley, 3rd Earl of Warwick
- Anne Dudley (poet) (c. 1610–1672), married name Anne Bradstreet, American poet
- Anne Dudley Blitz, American college administrator
- Anne (Dudley) Sutton (1589–1615), a companion of Elizabeth Stuart, Queen of Bohemia
