= Evelyn Newman =

Evelyn Newman may refer to:

- Evelyn (Edison) Newman (1920–2015), American philanthropist
- A. Evelyn Newman (1881–1969), American educator, writer and peace activist
- Eve Newman (1915–2003), American film and music editor
