= Thyrsa Amos =

American college administrator (1879–1941)

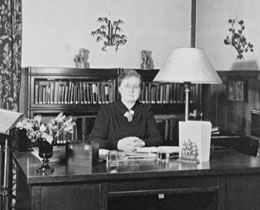
- Amos at her desk in Heinz House, c. 1920.
- Born: Thyrsa Wealtheow Amos; 1879; Frankfort, Indiana, US
- Died: May 5, 1941 (aged 61–62); Pittsburgh, Pennsylvania, US
- Occupations: Dean of Women and professor
- Known for: Founder of Lambda Sigma

Academic background
- Education: University of Kansas, BA psychology 1917; University of Kansas, MA behavioral psychology 1919
- Thesis: "High School Normal Training as Preparation for Rural Teaching". (1919)

Academic work
- Discipline: Educational Psychology
- Sub-discipline: Mental Testing and Educational Measurements
- Institutions: University of Pittsburgh

Thyrsa Wealtheow Amos (1879 – May 5, 1941) was an American academic and a college honor society founder. She was the dean of women and professor of education at the University of Pittsburgh, Pennsylvania, from 1919 to 1941. She was the founder of the Society of Cwens and a president of the National Association of Deans of Women (NADW). Her main area of interest was in student personnel, especially for women.

== Early life and education ==
Amos was born in Frankfort, Indiana in 1879. Her parents were Agnes (née Grove) and Joseph Bonaparte Amos. Her family moved to Shawnee, Oklahoma, becoming founders of the community. She received her primary education at public schools. She attended af school in Horton, Kansas in August 1899.

Amos attended the Fairmont College in Wichita, Kansas, graduating in 1903. She earned her bachelor's degree in psychology in 1917 from the University of Kansas, Phi Beta Kappa. While there, she joined Pi Gamma Sigma her junior year. She was also a member of Mortar Board.

She earned a Master of Arts degree in Educational Psychology with a concentration in Mental Testing, and Educational Measurements in 1919 from the University of Kansas. Her Master's thesis was titled "High School Normal Training as Preparation for Rural Teaching". Her main area of interest was in student personnel, especially for women.

She visited Howard University during the 1924–25 school year to attend meetings and give talks to the female students.

== Career ==
After graduating from Fairmont College, Amos was a teacher in Kansas and, later, principal of Spivey School in Kingman County, Kansas. She was elected president of the Kingman County Teacher's Association in September 1908. In 1915, she was a member of the executive committee of the Central Kansas Teacher's Association.

Starting in 1917, she was a faculty member and dean of girls at Shawnee High School in Shawnee, Oklahoma. During the summer sessions of 1917 to 1919, Amos was the social director and taught psychology at the University of Kansas.

Amos became the first Dean of Women at the University of Pittsburgh, serving from the fall of 1919 until she died in 1941. The Office of Dean of Women was created at a select number of established universities in the early 1900s to ensure that, outside the classroom, the experiences of female students complimented their overall academic success. She was also a professor of student personnel history.

Amos's office and other women's organizations of Pitt were located in Heinz House, a one-story wooden building north of Alumni Hall (now known as Eberly Hall) that was built in 1919. In 1924, Heinz House was closed and her office moved to the twelfth floor of the Cathedral of Learning.

Amos was the founder and first president of the Pennsylvania Association of Deans of Women and the president of the National Association of Deans of Women (NADW) from 1929 to 1931. She was also a member of the American College Personnel Association, American Association of University Women, the National Federation of Business and Professional Women, the Guidance Committee of the Pennsylvania Division of the National Youth Administration, and Pi Lambda Theta.

From 1927 to 1930, she taught a course for deans at Columbia University. In May 1935, Amos became the first woman to give a commencement speech at the Emporia State University Teachers College in Emporia, Kansas.

== Society of Cwens ==
Amos was an important influence in making mentoring, instead of hazing, the focus of women's organizations on campus. In the early 1920s, she saw the need for a society for outstanding sophomore women, as the University of Pittsburgh had recently started the Society of Druids for sophomore men. On November 7, 1922, twelve sophomore women responded to her invitations and met at Heinz House. They agreed to found the Society of Cwens to sponsor activities for all freshmen and sophomore women and to "select for membership in the spring those freshman women who displayed the finest Pitt spirit, showed good scholarship and expressed interest in activities through fine participation in them". The society was named Cwens, from the word cwēn, meaning "lady" or "queen" in Anglo-Saxon. The organization expanded from Pitt and became a national honor society.

In 1975, the Title IX Education Amendments mandated the abolishment of single-sex organizations in institutions of higher learning. In October 1975, Cwens chapter presidents gave authority to its national executive board to disband the society and to formulate plans for a national sophomore honor society for both men and women. The national board disbanded the National Society of Cwens, founding the Lambda Sigma Society as a direct descendant on March 6, 1976.

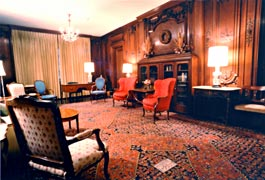
The Braun Room

== Honors ==
Amos received an honorary doctor of laws from the University of Pittsburgh in 1930; she was the second woman to receive this honor from the university.

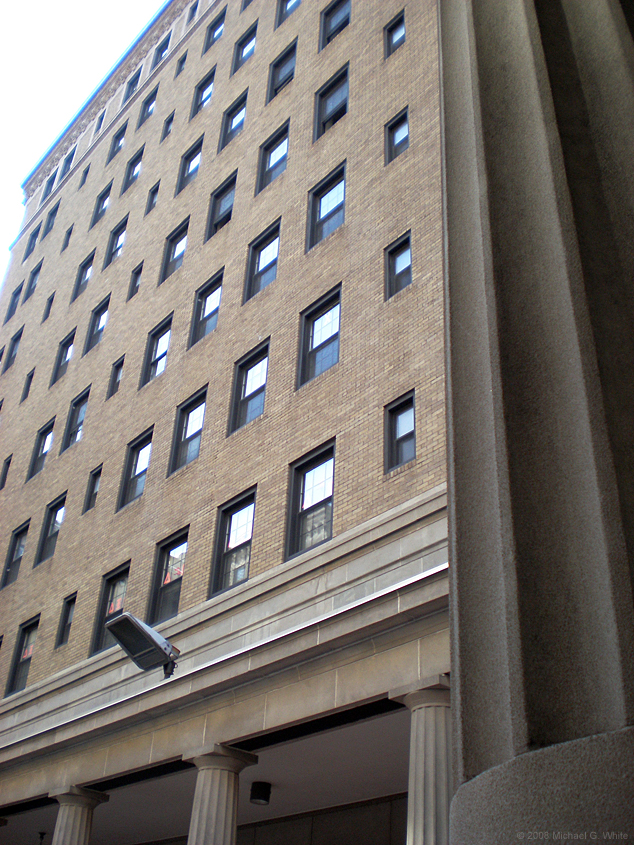
Amos Hall, University of Pittsburgh

The office space on the twelfth floor of the Cathedral of Learning was still unfinished when Amos died in 1941. The Alumnae Association created the Thyrsa W. Amos Fund to plaster the walls and to furnish Room 1217 in her name. Room 1217 was never finished, but after World War II the other rooms on the twelfth floor were completed including the Braun room which served as a meeting space for women students. Mrs. A. E. Braun donated the furnishings and floral carved mahogany wood paneling for The Braun Room which was dedicated in 1946.

Amos Hall, an all-female residence hall at Schenley Quadrangle at the University of Pittsburgh that houses nine sororities, is named after her. It was dedicated on June 9, 1961.

== Personal life ==
While working at the University of Pittsburgh, Amos lived at 166 North Dithridge Street in Pittsburgh. She was a member of the Daughters of the American Revolution, the Twentieth Century Club, and the Episcopal Church.

In 1940, Amos became ill and entered Magee Hospital in Pittsburgh. Amos died there eight months later on May 5, 1941, at the age of 62. She was buried in Pittsburgh.

== Selected publications ==
- I, Myself, and Me (1939)
- Attitudes (1939)
- And So to College: A Series of Six Radio Talks (1928)
- Educational values of the department of the dean of women (1927)
- The child self in the normal adult
- Some Data on the Intellectual Self
