= Marjorie Leeming =

Canadian tennis and badminton player

- Marjorie Leeming, circa 1930s
- Born: June 4, 1903; Kamloops, British Columbia, Canada
- Died: June 10, 1987; Victoria, British Columbia, Canada
- Education: University of British Columbia (BA, 1926)
- Occupations: Tennis player, teacher, physical education professor
- Employer: University of British Columbia
- Notable work: Modern Composition for High Schools and Collegiates 1935

Marjorie Leeming (June 4, 1903 – June 10, 1987) was a Canadian tennis player, badminton player and teacher. She won the Canadian Open ladies' singles title twice and was runner-up on four occasions. Leeming took the Canadian doubles championship three times and the mixed doubles twice. She won seven titles in British Columbia and was the Oregon State Tennis Championship singles winner in 1926. After her tennis ended due to injury, Leeming moved into education, co-authoring a 1935 school textbook on modern composition for use in schools in British Columbia. She taught badminton, golf and tennis to female students at the University of British Columbia before becoming Assistant to its Dean of Women. Leeming is an inductee of the BC Sports Hall of Fame, the Tennis Canada Hall of Fame and the Greater Victoria Sports Hall of Fame.

== Personal background ==
In 1903, Leeming was born in Kamloops, British Columbia, Canada. She had a sister, Hope, who was also a tennis player. When she was four years old, Leeming and her family moved to Victoria, British Columbia. She studied at Victoria High School. While enrolled at the University of British Columbia (UBC), Leeming was told she would fail her classes if she took some time off to meet another tennis player for an exhibition match in Vancouver since sport was not considered as legitimate activity for women in that era. She graduated from the UBC in 1926.

Leeming did not marry but lived with her friend and work colleague Dorothy Mawdsley for over fifty years. They first met in 1932, when they both taught at King Edward High School in Vancouver. In 1935, they jointly published a 452-page textbook, Modern Composition for High Schools and Collegiates, for use in schools in British Columbia.

Leeming died on June 10, 1987, in Victoria.

== Tennis career ==
While in high school, Leeming started her amateur tennis career. Aged 12, she won the annual challenge Pooley Cup to become the girls' junior tennis champion of British Columbia in 1915. Leeming won the trophy three more times from 1916 to 1918 to earn the Pooley Cup permanently. In 1909, when she was 16, she and Gerald Patterson played against Norman Brookes, the world champion, in a mixed doubles match. In 1921, Leeming won the British Columbia Tennis Championships singles as well as the ladies' doubles and mixed doubles titles. She won the singles, doubles and mixed doubles titles at the Victoria City Clay Court Championships the following year. In 1923, she progressed to the final of the women's singles division of the Oregon State Tennis Championship, and won the title with a victory over C. J. Cushing that July. Leeming took her second BC ladies' singles title and her first mixed doubles victory two weeks later, and added a second singles, doubles and mixed doubles victory at the Victoria City Clay Court Championships. She also took the title in the BC Mainland Championship in that year.

In 1924, Leeming was runner-up in her first Canadian Open singles final. She won her third singles and doubles titles win for the Victoria City Clay Court Championships that same year and her third British Columbia Tennis Championship singles accolade. Leeming ended the year No. 1 in the inaugural women's tennis rankings for British Columbia. She won the 1925 Canadian Open singles and doubles competitions, and the 1925 BC Mainland Championship title. Leeming went on to win the ladies' open and handicap singles as well as the mixed handicap doubles events in the BC Championships that same year. She added a second Canadian Open singles title, a fifth and third respective title in the singles event at each of the BC Championship and BC Mainland competitions in 1926. Leeming also won the singles Oregon State Championship event that same year. She ended the year No. 1 in each of the BC and Pacific North West Association rankings.

Leeming was selected by the British Columbia Lawn Tennis Association to compete at the 1928 Dominion Championships staged in Toronto. In January 1929, she progressed to the women's final of the Upisland Badminton Championships and won the title by defeating Anna Kier in the final. Leeming subsequently lost to Dorothy Weisel in straight sets of the women's final of the Oregon State Championship in July that year. In January 1930, she won two badminton titles in the ladies' singles and ladies' doubles at the Upper Island Badminton Championships. Leeming began the tennis year No. 1 in both the British Columbia and Pacific rankings. That year, she won each of the doubles and mixed doubles events and was runner-up in the singles competition at the Canadian Open. Leeming also played in that year's U.S. National Championships in the women's singles. She ended up as runner-up in the Canadian Open women's singles event in each of 1931 and 1932. Leeming and her sister lasted until the semi-finals in the women's doubles at the 1932 U.S. National Championships. After being deemed the favourite to win the women's singles competition of the Eastern Canadian Tennis Championships in Calgary, she took that title and paired with her sister to claim the women's doubles title.

Also from 1930 to 1932, Leeming was second in the women's Canadian rankings. She was again runner-up in the women's singles and the women's doubles at the 1932 Canadian Open, and lasted until the third round of the women's singles competition as a representative of Canada at that year's U.S. National Championships. Leeming was removed from BC rankings list because she had not competed in any singles event held in the province, but was ranked No. 2 in the national Canadian rankings at the start of 1933. She retired soon after on advice to cease playing tennis due to a hip injury she picked up in competition.

== Academic career ==
Leeming graduated from UBC in 1926 with a Bachelor of Arts. Subsequently, she did three years of teacher training at UBC and taught in Duncan before moving on to teach English at History at King Edward High School in Vancouver. In 1935, she and her friend Dorothy Mawdsley co-authored a school textbook, titled Modern Composition for High Schools and Collegiates for use in schools in British Columbia. After a period in England, she spent a year as an exchange teacher at Mansfield Boys' School, in Durban, Natal, South Africa, where she was the only Canadian amongst the staff there before returning to Canada in early 1940. In 1942, Leeming's two-hour film of the views and the flora and fauna of South Africa was shown at an illustrated lecture of hers held in aid of Vancouver Island's Queen Alexandra Solarium. She joined the faculty of UBC to instruct female students to play the individual sports of badminton, golf and tennis in 1947. From July 1951 to June 1959, Leeming was the Assistant to the university's Dean of Women. She subsequently retired to Vancouver Island, where she and Mawdsley constructed a cabin.

== Accolades and legacy ==
From 1923 to 1931, she was voted Outstanding Tennis Player in BC on six occasions in 1923, 1924, 1925, 1926, 1930 and 1931. Leeming was the first female tennis player to be elected to the BC Sports Hall of Fame as an individual in 1978. She earned induction into the Tennis Canada Hall of Fame in 1993. In November 1997, Leeming was inducted into the Greater Victoria Sports Hall of Fame. She was named as one of the Top 100 Island Athletes of the 20th Century by the sports department of the Times Colonist newspaper in December 1999. The UBC holds a black and white portrait photograph of Leeming in its UBC Archives Photograph Collection.
