= List of Lambda Sigma chapters =

Lambda Sigma is an American college honor society for second-year students. Originally named the Society of Cwens,it was established at the University of Pittsburgh in 1922 as a women's honors society and became a national organization in 1925. It became the coeducational Lambda Sigma on March 6, 1975.

In the following list of Lambda Sigma and the Society of Cwens chapters, active chapters are indicated in bold and inactive chapters are in italics:

Chapter	Charter date and range	Institution	Location	Status	Ref.
**Alpha**	November 7, 1922	University of Pittsburgh	Pittsburgh, Pennsylvania	Active	
Beta	April 6, 1925	Miami University	Oxford, Ohio	Inactive	
Gamma	1925	University of Missouri	Columbia, Missouri	Inactive	
Delta	June 4, 1927	Pennsylvania State University	State College, Pennsylvania	Inactive	
**Epsilon**	November 19, 1927	Allegheny College	Meadville, Pennsylvania	Active	
**Zeta**	1927	Muskingum University	New Concord, Ohio	Active	
**Eta**	May 2, 1929	Carnegie Mellon University	Pittsburgh, Pennsylvania	Active	
Theta	March 12, 1931	University of Kentucky	Lexington, Kentucky	Inactive	
**Iota**	March 1, 1941	University of Mississippi	Oxford, Mississippi	Active	
Kappa	October 20, 1945	Seton Hill University	Greensburg, Pennsylvania	Inactive	
**Lambda**	October 27, 1945	University of Mississippi	University, Mississippi	Active	
**Mu**	March 11, 1948 - 2006; March 25, 2014	Eastern Kentucky University	Richmond, Kentucky	Active	
Nu	October 18, 1952	University of Louisville	Louisville, Kentucky	Inactive	
Xi	April 11, 1953	Grove City College	New Wilmington, Pennsylvania	Inactive	
**Omicron**	December 5, 1954	Northern Illinois University	DeKalb, Illinois	Active	
**Pi**	May 18, 1957	Auburn University	Auburn, Alabama	Active	
**Rho**	May 3, 1959	Thiel College	Greenville, Pennsylvania	Active	
Sigma	May 16, 1959	Alfred University	Alfred, New York	Inactive	
**Tau**	November 20, 1960	University of Kansas	Lawrence, Kansas	Active	
Upsilon	November 18, 1961	Morehead State University	Morehead, Kentucky	Inactive	
Phi	1963 ?	Union College	Barbourville, Kentucky	Inactive	
**Chi**	May 2, 1964	Louisiana Tech University	Ruston, Louisiana	Active	
Psi	May 9, 1965	University of Central Missouri	Warrensburg, Missouri	Inactive	
**Omega**	May 14, 1965	Pittsburg State University	Pittsburg, Kansas	Active	
Alpha Alpha	November 19, 1966	University of Mount Union	Alliance, Ohio	Inactive	
Alpha Beta	March 22, 1969	University of Oklahoma	Norman, Oklahoma	Inactive	
**Alpha Gamma**	September 29, 1969	Duquesne University	Pittsburgh, Pennsylvania	Active	
**Alpha Delta**	October 25, 1970	University of Southern Mississippi	Hattiesburg, Mississippi	Active	
**Alpha Epsilon**	March 14, 1971	Mansfield University of Pennsylvania	Mansfield, Pennsylvania	Active	
**Alpha Zeta**	April 30, 1972	Texas A&M University	College Station, Texas	Active	
**Alpha Eta**	May 4, 1974	Penn State Erie, The Behrend College	Erie, Pennsylvania	Active	(Note: Originally started in 1970 as Delta Behrend as part of the Delta chapter at Penn State.)
**Alpha Theta**	November 17, 1974	Slippery Rock University	Slippery Rock, Pennsylvania	Active	
**Alpha Iota**	November 1978	Mississippi State University	Starkville, Mississippi	Active	
**Alpha Kappa**	January 19, 1979	Georgia Institute of Technology	Atlanta, Georgia	Active	
**Alpha Lambda**	April 5, 1981	D'Youville College	Buffalo, New York	Active	
**Alpha Mu**	Spring 1981	Berry College	Mount Berry, Georgia	Active	
Alpha Nu	November 13, 1982	Butler University	Indianapolis, Indiana	Inactive	
Alpha Xi	May 1983	Texas Tech University	Lubbock, Texas	Inactive	
Alpha Omicron	January 25, 1983	Penn State Beaver	Center Township, Beaver County, Pennsylvania	Inactive	
**Alpha Pi**	November 25, 1984	Lawrence University	Appleton, Wisconsin	Active	
Alpha Rho	January 18, 1987	Robert Morris University	Moon Township, Pennsylvania	Inactive	
**Alpha Sigma**	January 31, 1987	Gannon University	Erie, Pennsylvania	Active	
**Alpha Tau**	Spring 1988	University of Alabama	Tuscaloosa, Alabama	Active	
Alpha Upsilon	October 1991	Mount Saint Clare College	Clinton, Iowa	Inactive	
**Alpha Phi**	November 1991	Ferrum College	Ferrum, Virginia	Active	
Alpha Chi	April 5, 1992	Notre Dame College	South Euclid, Ohio	Inactive	
**Alpha Psi**	June 4, 1995	University of Toledo	Appleton, Wisconsin	Active	
**Alpha Omega**	December 10, 1995	Westfield State University	Westfield, Massachusetts	Active	
Beta Alpha	February 25, 1996	University of Montevallo	Montevallo, Alabama	Inactive	
Beta Beta	September 1996	Mississippi University for Women	Columbus, Mississippi	Inactive	
**Beta Gamma**	October 4, 1998	University of Pikeville	Pikeville, Kentucky	Active	
**Beta Delta**	April 28, 2000	Middle Tennessee State University	Murfreesboro, Tennessee	Active	
**Beta Epsilon**	January 27, 2002	Washington University in St. Louis	St. Louis, Missouri	Active	
**Beta Zeta**	2005	Pace University New York City	New York City, New York	Active	
**Beta Eta**	April 2006	Pace University Pleasantville	Pleasantville, New York	Active	
Beta Theta	September 12, 2006	Urbana University	Urbana, Ohio	Inactive	
Beta Iota	November 19, 2008	Texas A&M University–Kingsville	Kingsville, Texas	Inactive	
**Beta Kappa**	October 3, 2008	George Mason University	Fairfax, Virginia	Active	
**Beta Lambda**	October 5, 2009	University of North Carolina at Pembroke	Pembroke, North Carolina	Active	
**Beta Mu**	April 12, 2010	Alvernia University	Reading, Pennsylvania	Active	
Beta Nu	September 3, 2013	Minnesota State University, Mankato	Mankato, Minnesota	Inactive	
**Beta Xi**	April 20, 2015	Jackson State University	Jackson, Mississippi	Active	
**Beta Omicron**	March 16, 2016	University of West Alabama	Livingston, Alabama	Active	
**Beta Pi**	October 25, 2018	Jacksonville State University	Jacksonville, Alabama	Active	
