= Kate Hevner Mueller =

Psychologist and educator

- Born: November 1, 1898; Westmoreland County, Pennsylvania, US
- Died: August 10, 1984 (aged 85)
- Education: Ph.D.
- Alma mater: Wilson College; Columbia University; University of Chicago
- Occupation: Psychologist
- Spouse: John Mueller (1935–1965)

Kate Hevner Mueller (November 1, 1898 – August 10, 1984) was an American psychologist and educator who served as dean of women at Indiana University during 1938–1949.

== Biography ==
Born Kate Lucile Hevner in Westmoreland County, Pennsylvania, she was the second daughter and middle child to a minister father and a schoolteacher mother. She attended Williamsport High School then matriculated in 1916 to Wilson College, where she majored in English with a minor in French. She graduated in 1920 with a Bachelor of Arts with honors. During her junior year she took a course in psychology, where she developed an interest in the subject.

Returning to her home town of Williamsport, she taught mathematics at the local high school until 1922. She then enrolled as a graduate student at Columbia University to study psychology, receiving a masters in 1923. She became an instructor at Wilson, teaching mathematics and psychology up until 1926 when she applied for a fellowship to study at the University of Chicago under L. L. Thurstone. In 1928 she finished her thesis, An Empirical Study of Three Psychophysical Methods, and was awarded a doctoral degree in Psychology.

In 1929 she joined the faculty at the University of Minnesota. During the summer of 1931, she journeyed to the University of Oregon to perform research on aesthetics. While there, she met her future husband, John Mueller. In 1935, she resigned from Minnesota to join her husband at Indiana University, where he became an associate professor. After teaching part-time at the IU extension campus in Indianapolis, Mueller became dean of women at Indiana in 1938, taking over the office from Agnes E. Wells who was retiring for health reasons.

Within six months after the end of World War II, there was a large influx of new students on the campus. University President Herman B Wells took this opportunity to reorganize student affairs. Mueller was not consulted about the change and was only informed about it by a junior male colleague. This act of replacing older female deans with former military members was happening elsewhere across the country.

Mueller resigned from the Office of Dean of Women in 1949, wherein she joined the education department as an associate professor. She later taught graduate courses in Personnel and Guidance, establishing the Master's Program in College Student Personnel during the 1950s. She served as President of the Esthetics Division of the American Psychological Association during 1951–1952. She was named full professor in 1954. From 1960 until 1969, she was the editor of the NAWDAC Journal. In 1965, her husband reached the mandatory retirement age, then died two months later from cancer. Despite the loss, Kate Hevner Mueller continued to teach at Indiana until her retirement in 1969, then spent a year teaching at University of Florida.

== Awards and honors ==
- A 1959 Women's News Service Poll named her as one of 70 women qualified to serve as Vice President of the United States.
- 1978 George D. Kuh Award for Outstanding Contribution to Research and Literature Award from the National Association of Student Personnel Administrators.
- 1982 Distinguished Service Award from the National Association of Women Deans, Administrators, and Councillors (NAWDAC).
- 1963 Mills College Honorary Doctor of Humane Letters.
- The Indiana University Kate Hevner Mueller Senior Award was founded in 2013 in her honor. These are given to "IU seniors who have proven leadership on campus both inside and outside of the classroom and who have improved the IU community by their presence".
