= Annie Marion MacLean =

American sociologist (1869–1934)

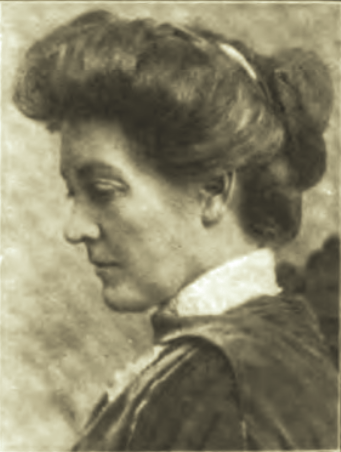
Annie Marion MacLean

Annie Marion MacLean (1869 – 1934) was a pioneering American sociologist of the women's Chicago School, and is sometimes referred to as the "mother of contemporary ethnography". She was one of the first women to pursue a professional career in sociology.

Regarded today as a feminist pragmatist, MacLean is particularly remembered for her pioneering work in participant observation, and for her rigorous application of her sociological findings to immediate social problems. She is particularly known for her studies of working and immigrant women. MacLean's work was strongly informed by her association with social reformers such as Jane Addams, as well as founding scholars of sociology such as Albion Small, Charles Henderson, and George Herbert Mead.

== Early life and education ==
MacLean was born in St. Peters Bay, Prince Edward Island, and raised in Nova Scotia. Her father was a Baptist minister, and she received her preparatory education at the Baptist Acadia Seminary in Wolfville, Nova Scotia. She went on to study at Acadia University (then known as Acadia College), receiving her bachelor's degree in 1893 and her master's in 1894. She then emigrated to Illinois, hoping to study at the University of Chicago, which had recently been established. Her brother Haddon had moved to Chicago in 1892, and had described the city to her. However, due to the shortage of funds she first worked for two years at Shimer College (then known as the Mount Carroll Seminary).

MacLean was the first woman to receive a master's degree in sociology (in 1897), and the second to receive a Ph.D. (in 1900), both from the University of Chicago. Her master's thesis was on "Factor Legislation for Women in the United States", laying the groundwork for a lifetime of work studying the conditions of working women. Her dissertation dealt with another lifelong theme, immigration, and was titled "The Acadian Element in the Population of Nova Scotia". A portion of the dissertation was published in 1900; the remainder appears to have been lost.

== Teaching and administrative career ==
We know very well that the world would still wag on if all the wise tariff talkers succumbed to starvation today; while if the cooking sorority went on strike Time would be exchanged for Eternity, which is only another way of saying that women are handling the real business of life, and we should be glad to see that they are introducing scientific management into it, and are promoting it with zeal.

— Annie Marion MacLean, "Where Queen Cook Reigns", Frances Shimer Record 7:4, December 1915

MacLean's teaching and administrative work began at Shimer College, then known as the Mount Carroll Seminary and located in Mount Carroll, Illinois. She worked at Shimer from 1894 to 1896, serving as instructor of Latin and lady principal, a position approximating the later role she served as Dean of Women. Her sister, Mildred, also worked at Shimer. The MacLean sisters remained in contact with the Shimer community into their retirement in the 1930s.

As a woman, MacLean was largely excluded from conventional academic positions in her field. Unlike male students, she was not hired into the sociology department, even though she "far surpassed the productivity of her male peers". Her initial teaching posts after her graduate study were at Royal Victoria College in Montreal, where she taught from 1900 to 1901, and at Stetson University in Florida, where she taught sociology from 1901 to 1903.

She taught correspondence courses in the University of Chicago's Home Study Department from 1903 to a few months before her death in 1934. In addition, she taught as a professor of sociology at Adelphi College from 1906 to 1916, and at the YWCA National Training School from 1903 to 1916. In the Home Study Department at the U of C, MacLean worked alongside other notable women sociologists, including Edith Abbott and Sophonisba Breckinridge. She taught courses on subjects including rural life, social technology, and immigration. In the course of her career as a correspondence-school professor, she taught 799 students.

== Sociological and writing career ==
MacLean was a highly sophisticated methodologist, using a pragmatic blend of methods to address the specific practical questions at hand. Her techniques included participant observation, social surveys, and social worlds.

MacLean's research career reached its peak with a 1907-1908 study that she supervised under the auspices of the YWCA, using a staff of twenty-nine women sociologists surveying 400 companies employing a total of 135,000 women in more than twenty cities. The study led to her pathbreaking work on women's employment, Wage-Earning Women (1910).

== Later life and legacy ==
In the 1920s, ill health forced MacLean to retire from non-correspondence teaching. She died on May 1, 1934, at her home in Pasadena, California. She had been living there with her sister Mildred since 1925.

MacLean's use of participant observation, well ahead of the time that this technique became mainstream, has earned her the title of "mother of ethnography", However, the accuracy of this name has been disputed by scholars of her work, who note much earlier ethnographic work by Harriet Martineau. MacLean's biographer Mary Jo Deegan has identified her as a predecessor to later work in case study research, contemporary critical ethnography, and feminist ethnography. MacLean's dedicated work as a correspondence educator, a relatively new phenomenon at the time, has also attracted contemporary attention.

== Bibliography ==
=== Books ===
- Wage-Earning Women (1910)
- Mary Ann's Malady (1916)
- Women Workers and Society (1916)
- Some Problems of Reconstruction (1921)
- Our Neighbors (1922)
- Modern Immigration (1925)
- Cheero (1928)

== Sources ==
- Deegan, Mary Jo (1991). "Annie Marion MacLean". Women in Sociology: A Bio-Bibliographical Sourcebook. Bloomsbury Academic. pp. 280–283. ISBN 9780313260858.
- Deegan, Mary Jo; Hill, Michael R.; Wortmann, Susan L. (2009). "Annie Marion MacLean, Feminist Pragmatist and Methodologist". Journal of Contemporary Ethnography. 38 (6): 280–283. doi:10.1177/0891241609341780.
- Deegan, Mary Jo (2014). Annie Marion MacLean and the Chicago Schools of Sociology, 1894-1934. Transaction Publishers. ISBN 9781412852883.
- Fish, Virginia Kemp (2001). "MacLean, Annie Marion". In Rima Lunin Schulz; Adele Hast (eds.). Women Building Chicago, 1790-1990. Indiana University Press. pp. 529–531. ISBN 0253338522.
- Dauder, Silvia García (2008). "Annie Marion MacLean:" madre de la etnografía contemporánea" y pionera en la Sociología por correspondencia". Athenea Digital. 13: 237–246.
- Hallett, Tim; Jeffers, Greg (2008). "A Long-Neglected Mother of Contemporary Ethnography: Annie Marion MacLean and the Memory of a Method". Journal of Contemporary Ethnography. 37 (3). doi:10.1177/0891241607303584. S2CID 145660152.
