= Dorothy Mawdsley =

Canadian Educator

- Mawdsley as Dean of Women in 1945
- Born: November 27, 1898; Florence, Italy
- Died: August 5, 1993 (aged 94); Vancouver, British Columbia, Canada
- Citizenship: Canadian
- Education: McGill University (BA); University of British Columbia (MA); University of Chicago (PhD)
- Occupations: Dean of Women, English professor
- Employer: University of British Columbia
- Notable work: "The Influence of Marlowe on Shakespeare" (UBC Master's thesis, 1927); "Francis Sabie: His Life and Works" (U of Chicago doctoral dissertation, 1933); Modern Composition for High Schools and Collegiates (1935)

Mary Dorothy Mawdsley (November 27, 1898 – August 5, 1993), known professionally as M. Dorothy Mawdsley or Dorothy Mawdsley, was a Canadian educator, administrator, author, and advocate for women’s rights. She is best known for her role as Dean of Women at the University of British Columbia (UBC) from 1941 until her retirement in 1959, where she championed policies that supported women’s rights in higher education. She was also an early advocate for women’s rights in the workforce including equal pay for equal work – particularly after the end of World War II, when women were being displaced from jobs by returning men.

== Early life and education ==
Mary Dorothy Mawdsley was born in Florence, Italy in 1898 where her American mother and British father were studying and working. She was the youngest of four children and the only daughter to her mother, Jessie Lillian Mawdsley (née Bull) (1865–1956) and her father, James Mawdsley (1868–1961). Her brothers were James Buckland Mawdsley (1894–1964), Robert Watson Mawdsley (1896–1976), and Arthur Richard Cook Mawdsley (1897–1958).

She attended kindergarten in Italy before her family left the country when Mawdsley was five. They sailed on the ship Italia, which departed Naples on April 9, 1904, and landed in New York on April 23. From there, the family continued on to Toronto, Ontario, and eventually settled in the village of Gainsborough, Saskatchewan, in 1905. During these early years in Canada, Mawdsley attended grade schools in Ontario and Saskatchewan.

After completing her primary education, Mawdsley enrolled at the Royal Victoria College (RVC) at McGill University where she received a Bachelor of Arts (BA) in 1920. During her time at McGill, Mawdsley held executive positions in the Delta Sigma Society, including Vice President in 1920 and President in 1921; the society promoted literary and dramatic events on campus, including public speaking, debates, literary competitions, and productions of various dramatic works. In this role, she won awards in debating and public speaking.

At McGill she was Women’s Editor of The McGill Daily, school newspaper, where gender discrimination limited her role. As a woman, she was not allowed to enter the Student Union Building where the newspaper was published, and had to communicate with her male co-editor by phone. Mawdsley was required to collect her own and other female reporters' stories and then give them to a messenger boy to take into the office. Even talking to men in lectures would have been deemed a "social error".

== Early academic career ==
=== Master of Arts, UBC (1925–1927) ===
Following her passion for literature, Dorothy joined UBC as a graduate student, earning a Master of Arts degree with a major in English and a minor in French in May 1927. Her 143-page master’s thesis was titled "The Influence of Marlowe on Shakespeare."

=== Department of English, UBC (1928–1932) ===
After completing her MA, Mawdsley began teaching in UBC's Department of English as an "Assistant." During this time, she used her earnings to fund her PhD studies, which she pursued between UBC's academic sessions.

This continued until 1932, when she, like many single members of the faculty, was discharged from her position due to the university's financial difficulties. During this hiatus from UBC, Mawdsley worked as a teacher at King Edward High School in Vancouver from 1932 until 1940.

=== PhD, University of Chicago (1930–1933) ===
While teaching at UBC, Mawdsley began her doctoral studies at the University of Chicago and received her PhD in 1933, with her doctoral dissertation, "Francis Sabie: His Life and Works".

== Return to UBC: English professor and Dean of Women ==
In 1940, Mawdsley rejoined UBC as an English professor and was subsequently appointed Dean of Women in 1941. In this role, Mawdsley also served as a member of UBC’s senate from 1942 to 1959.

The position of Dean of Women at UBC was established in 1921. Mary L. Bollert was its first appointee and she remained in the position until 1941. The responsibilities of the Dean were initially "ill-defined," but over time the office's work supported female students through programs covering a wide range of concerns including housing, orientation and vocational concerns.

In Lee Jean Stewart's 1990 book, "It's Up to You": Women at UBC in the Early Years, she states that Mawdsley brought a "new image" to the role and describes her as having a "down-to-earth, pragmatic disposition and quick sense of humour". When compared with her predecessor, Mawdsley was seen as "more of a scholar" than a social figure.

As Dean of Women, Mawdsley opposed segregated instruction, based on gender, seeing it as reinforcing women's subordinate status when compared to men. However, she focussed her work on establishing dedicated dormitories for women, which she saw the lack of as a "serious impediment to women's access to higher education."

Mawdsley believed the cost of higher education hit women harder than men, because women's remuneration was lower in summer jobs. She launched "Buttercup Enterprises Ltd.," a campus employment bureau connecting female students with typing work or babysitting jobs. The Buttercup name references a character from Gilbert and Sullivan's HMS Pinafore.

After retiring in 1959, "Mawdsley was critical of some of the other administrative practices she felt were disadvantageous to women." This included money she had raised for a Dean of Women's Fund (for student emergencies) that she stated was absorbed into the general budget and "not available to her when she needed them."

== Personal life ==
Mawdsley and Marjorie Leeming shared a friendship and professional partnership that began in 1932, when they both taught at King Edward High School in Vancouver. Marjorie was a Canadian tennis champion, winning the Canadian Open Ladies’ singles title twice and Canadian doubles championship three times. She was inducted into the BC Sports Hall of Fame in 1977 and, posthumously, into the Tennis Canada Hall of Fame in 1993.

At King Edward, Marjorie and Dorothy quickly became close friends and work colleagues. Shortly after they met, Marjorie moved into Dorothy’s home, and they lived together for over fifty years until Marjorie’s health declined. In 1935, they jointly published a 452-page textbook, Modern Composition for High Schools and Collegiates, for use in schools in British Columbia. Their collaboration extended through the subsequent decades as educators and administrators and they bonded as friends over their mutual love of gardening and dogs. Neither ever married.

=== Supreme Court of British Columbia dispute re Leeming's guardianship ===
The two lived together until 1984, when Marjorie had to relocate to extended care due to progressing symptoms of dementia.

Although Marjorie had granted power of attorney to Dorothy to manage her financial affairs, Marjorie’s sister and cousin petitioned a judge to appoint the cousin as "committee to have personal custody" of Marjorie and "manage her affairs ..." In British Columbia, the term "committee" describes a guardian for an adult "who is not mentally capable of making decisions about his or her own health care and personal affairs ..." This is also known as Adult Guardianship and is similar to the more common Legal guardian appointment. The court accepted their request, and the cousin was appointed as committee in July 1984.

Marjorie's family did not notify Dorothy of their request to the court because their counsel was concerned "it might have invited litigation" from Dorothy. Regardless, upon learning of the appointment, Dorothy petitioned the Supreme Court of British Columbia to rescind this decision. Due to Dorothy's “long-term devoted friendship” with Marjorie and “in view of the unique relationship” between the two women, the court discharged the cousin as committee and appointed Dorothy in October 1984.

This BC Supreme Court decision occurred fifteen years prior to the landmark case of M. v. H. (1999) which recognized – under the Canadian Charter of Rights and Freedoms – the "rights of cohabiting same-sex couples." The M. v. H. ruling enforced equal treatment for both same-sex and opposite-sex partnerships. Dorothy and Marjorie's case may be an unrecognized element of Canadian same-sex rights.

Dorothy and Marjorie remained close until Marjorie passed away in 1987 at the age of 84.

== Legacy ==
Mawdsley's impact on the students and institution of UBC has left an enduring legacy. Even after her retirement, her influence was documented and formally recognized by the university.

M. Dorothy Mawdsley Bursary – In 1995, a bursary was created in Mawdsley's name following a bequest in her will; it is offered annually to female students in graduate programs at UBC.

UBC Women's History Project – In 1979, Mawdsley and Marjorie Leeming were interviewed as part of this research project, in which they recounted their "lives and careers and activities of women on campus," including the Dean of Women role, in a 108-minute recording for UBC Archives.

Dorothy Mawdsley House (student residence) – She was instrumental in establishing women's residences, and in 1961, shortly after her 1959 retirement, a women's residence was named in her honour by UBC's Board of Governors. The building is part of the Place Vanier Residence complex.

== Publications ==
Mawdsley authored / co-authored several publications during her academic and professional career:

- 1927 – UBC master's thesis, "The Influence of Marlowe on Shakespeare"
- 1931 – Children’s Book, Children of Italy, written during her initial term at UBC
- 1933 – University of Chicago doctoral dissertation, "Francis Sabie: His Life and Works"
- 1935 – English textbook, Modern Composition for High Schools and Collegiates, co-authored with Marjorie Leeming while both taught at King Edward High School in Vancouver and used in schools in British Columbia
- 1936 – University of Chicago "The Use of Latin Sources in the Writings of Francis Sabie"
