= Mary E. Metzgar =

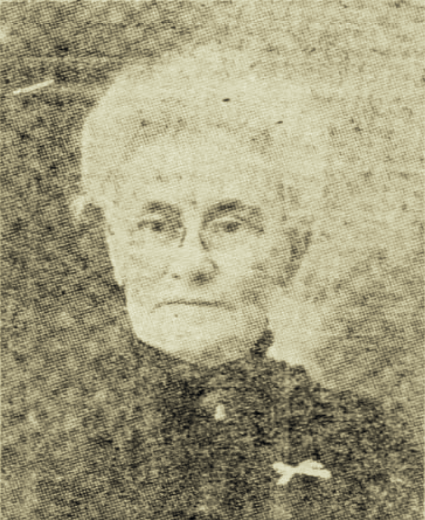
The Dispatch (1913)

Mary E. Metzgar (1849–1919) was an American temperance worker associated with the Woman's Christian Temperance Union (WCTU).

== Early life and education ==
Mary Elvira Brown was born at Port Byron, Illinois, August 3, 1849. Her parents were Adoniram Judson Brown and Paulina R. Brown. Her father died when she was a young girl. Her mother died in Moline in 1909.

She was educated in the local public schools and at Mount Carroll Seminary, Mount Carroll, Illinois.

== Career ==
For many years, Metzgar was identified with social movements in her home city and State, being particularly active in temperance and charitable work. Joining the WCTU in 1874, she took a prominent part in its activities, serving for several years as president of the Moline City and Rock Island County Union and of the Congressional District Union. She also served as vice-president of the Illinois State Union, and held at different times the offices of State superintendent of the Purity, Law Enforcement, and Legislative departments of Union work, as well as that of District superintendent. As Legislative superintendent, she was influential in securing the enactment of: the law requiring police matrons in the cities of the State; the law requiring scientific temperance instruction in the public schools.

From 1881, she was a member of the Prohibition Party and gave it her full support. She was president of the Moline Woman's Club in 1913–14, and was for years chairman of the legislative committee of that body, being honorary chairman at the time of her death. She was at one time president of Bethany Home Protective association. She was member of the Baptist church of Moline since childhood and was also a member of the Daughters of the American Revolution and the Woman's Relief Corps.

Before the office of police matron was established, she was called on to help in the work of the office, and seeing the need of a woman in that office, she organized the lobby at Springfield, Illinois which, under her direction, brought about the passage of the police matron bill. She also helped pass the scientific instruction bill in public schools, as well as the bill by which the state of Illinois appropriated US$5,000 for a statue of Frances Willard in Statuary Hall in Washington, D.C. She kept up her work even after her health failed.

== Personal life ==
In 1867, she married Marcellus R. Metzgar, of Port Byron, afterward removing to Davenport, Iowa, (1881) and then to Moline, Illinois (1884). The last few years of her life were spent in Florida.

Mary E. Metzgar died in Moline, Illinois, April 11, 1919, the cause of death being a poor state of health following a stroke of paralysis a few years earlier.
