= Mary L. Moreland =

American Congregational minister, evangelist, suffragist, writer

Mary Leona Moreland
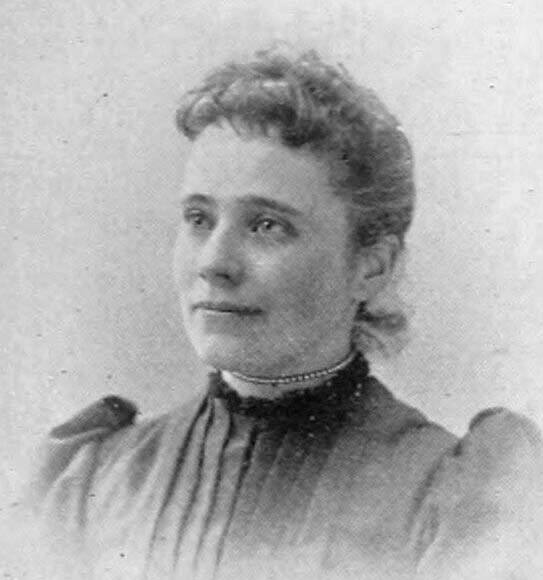
- Photo in A Woman of the Century
- Born: December 23, 1859; Westfield, Massachusetts, U.S.
- Died: March 17, 1918 (aged 58); Belvidere, Illinois, U.S.
- Education: Appleton Academy; Moody Bible Institute; Illinois Wesleyan University; Creal Springs College; Chicago Theological Seminary
- Occupations: minister, teacher, writer
- Writing career
- Notable works: Which, Right or Wrong? (1883)

Mary L. Moreland (December 23, 1859 – March 17, 1918) was an American Congregational minister as well as a teacher and a writer. Among her publications can be counted Which, Right or Wrong? (1883) and The School on the Hill, Or, The New England Assembly (1885). Moreland received her education in academies of Massachusetts and New Hampshire, followed later by a Chautauqua normal course. After coming west, she took several short courses at the Moody Bible Institute in Chicago, and received a degree at the Illinois Wesleyan University in Bloomington, Illinois. Prior to her ordination, Moreland had been a teacher, lecturer for the Woman's Christian Temperance Union (WCTU), and an evangelist. It was while she was engaged as an evangelist in Illinois that the members of First Congregational Church of Wyanet, Illinois invited her to become their pastor. She was ordained at Wyanet, July 19, 1889, and held the pastorate there for seven years. This was followed by pastorates at McLean, Normal, Chebanse, Mazon, and Belvidere. Moreland favored woman suffrage and as a minister, she lectured for the cause. She was the author of numerous books and pamphlets.

== Early life and education ==
Mary Leona Moreland was born in Westfield, Massachusetts, December 23, 1859. Her parents were James William and Harriet Atwood (Smith) Moreland. On her father's side, she was of Scotch ancestry.

She started school at the age of six years. The family removed to New Ipswich, New Hampshire, where they lived six years. She was converted at the age of fourteen and joined the Baptist Church. While there, at the age of fourteen, she entered Appleton Academy and graduated with the high record of scholarship. Soon after her graduation, the family removed to Fitchburg, Massachusetts. There she became a member of the First Baptist Church.

About that time, she began her temperance work. She was among the first of Massachusetts young women to take the white ribbon in the WCTU, and, although a girl of sixteen, she was upon the platform a successful lecturer.

She continued her education at Illinois Wesleyan University (Ph.B., 1903; M.A.); Creal Springs College; oratory at the School of Oratory, Chicago; the Chicago Theological Seminary; and Moody Bible Institute, Chicago.

== Career ==
Moreland taught school several terms. She attended the Chautauqua Assembly to Lake View, Framingham, Massachusetts for six consecutive years which laid a foundation for the study of the ministry, to which she added the normal courses in the Bible and also took the four years in the Chautauqua Literary and Scientific Circle, class of 1884. She studied theology two winters in the home of Rev. Mr. Chick.

While in the assembly, she collected the materials for her books, Which, Right or Wrong? (Boston), and The School on the Hill. During the four years in which she was taking the Chautauqua course, editing the above books and contributing many short articles to different papers, she was constantly invited to address public meetings. She was the author of several booklets, including "Domestic Problem", "Women in the Bible", "The Flag of the Free", "Mother's Opportunity", and "His Guidance".

In 1882, she had occupied the pulpit a number of times, but had not then thought that she was called to ministerial work. In the fall of 1885, she went to Illinois on a visit to her sister, intending to labor in the West in the cause of temperance. She became interested in revival work, in which she has been eminently successful. Her first revival was through a meeting held in the interest of the WCTU. The most remarkable of those revivals was that which occurred in February and March, 1889, in Sharon and Spring Hilt. There were more than 100 conversions and a church was organized.

Her first call to settle as pastor was in the summer of 1888, in the Keithsburg circuit, Illinois conference, by Elder Smith, of the United Brethren Church. She declined to accept the invitation. At that time, Rev. E. M Baxter, of the Dixon district, urged her to preach the gospel, and Rev. Louis Curtis, elder of that district, requested her to spend the time which she could spare from revival work in Eldena, Illinois. She began her labors, and they gave her a unanimous call, but being a Methodist Church, according to the discipline, she could only be a stated supply. A few months later, she received an invitation to supply the pulpit of the First Congregational Church of Wyanet, Illinois. The church prospered, and the people desired that Moreland should be ordained and installed as their pastor. After much persuasion and deliberation, she consented. A council of six ministers and the same number of delegates from the adjacent churches convened in Wyanet, July 19, 1889. It was one of few instances in which a woman was called to the ministry in the Congregational church in the United States. After a rigid examination, the council retired and voted unanimously to proceed to the ordination.

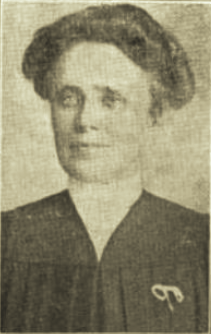
Mary Moreland (Union Signal, 1918)

Moreland represented the women of the ministry of the Congregational denomination at the World's Congresses held at the World's Columbian Exposition in Chicago, 1893. She served the pastorate in Wyanet until 1895. Thereafter, she held pastorates in several other cities in Illinois: McLean, Normal, Chicago, Chebanse, and Mazon, the last being in Belvidere, from May 1917.

== Death ==
Moreland never married. She died of pneumonia at Belvidere, Illinois, March 17, 1918.

== Selected works ==
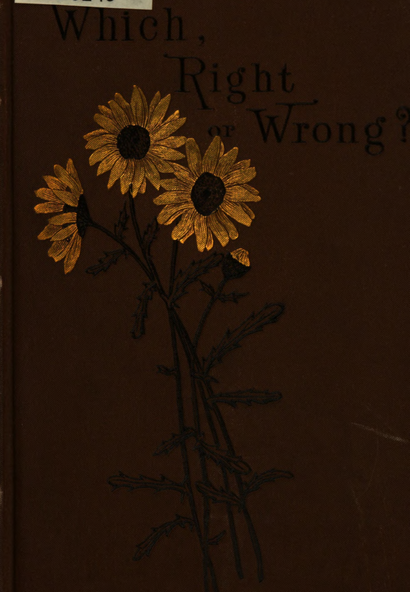
Which, Right or Wrong (1883)

=== Books ===
- Which, Right or Wrong? (1883)
- The School on the Hill, Or, The New England Assembly: Sequel to "Which: Right Or Wrong" (1885)

=== Booklets ===
- "Domestic Problem"
- "Women in the Bible"
- "The Flag of the Free"
- "Mother's Opportunity"
- "His Guidance"
