= Edna Mosher =

Canadian entomologist

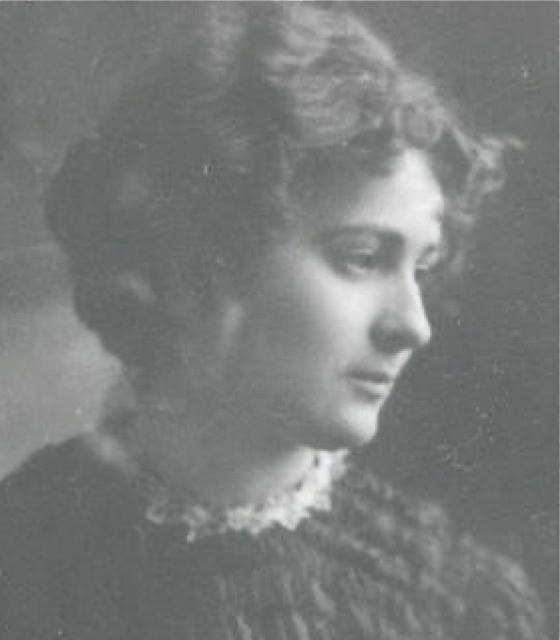
- Born: July 20, 1878; Kempt Shore, Hants County, Nova Scotia
- Died: May 7, 1972 (aged 93); Windsor, Nova Scotia
- Occupation: Entomologist
- Notable work: A classification of the Lepidoptera based on characters of the pupae 1915. Thesis (PhD.) University of Illinois; The grasses of Illinois 1918. Bulletin No. 205. University of Illinois Agricultural Experiment Station.

Edna Mosher (July 20, 1878 – May 7, 1972) was a Canadian entomologist and lepidopterist known for her pioneering work on Lepidoptera pupae morphology.

== Early life and education ==
Edna Mosher was born in July 1878 at Kempt Shore, Hants County, Nova Scotia to John Fulton and Margaret Harvie Mosher. She learned natural history from her father and grandfather, and her mother and grandmother taught her horticulture. From an early age, she expressed a desire to teach. She graduated from Provincial Normal School. Her initial attempts to attend a university were hindered by the fact she was a woman. In 1905, she began a class in gardening at Cornell University. She was then able to obtain permission to pursue a degree in science. At Cornell, she studied botany and zoology; it is where she first took entomology.

After graduating with a Bachelor's of Science in 1908, she obtained a fellowship in entomology at the University of Illinois. She earned her Master of Science in 1913. She was denied a fellowship for a Doctor of Philosophy because she was a woman. The Illinois Natural History Survey offered her work, which she excepted. In 1914, she was granted a fellowship that would allow her to turn her work with the Illinois Natural History Survey into a doctoral dissertation. In 1915, she was awarded a doctorate, and her thesis A Classification of the Lepidoptera based on characters of the pupae was published as a major bulletin of the Illinois State Laboratory of Natural History. Her doctoral advisor was Alexander D. MacGillivray. Mosher's thesis, considered pioneering at the time, remains a definitive work on Lepidoptera.

== Career ==
Edna Mosher taught school in Nova Scotia from 1902–1905 to earn enough to pay for her own education. After earning her Bachelor's degree, Mosher was a supervisor of nature study and school gardens until 1910. She taught for a time at Gary, Indiana. In 1913 she began work for the Illinois Natural History Survey. In 1915 she worked at the Maine Agricultural Experiment Station for a summer. Following that, she was an instructor at Illinois, Ohio State University, and eventually the University of New Mexico. At the University of New Mexico, she became a Professor of Biology and later Dean of Women. In 1923, after her mother fell ill, Mosher moved to Garden City, New York where she taught biology at Adelphi University until retirement in 1942. She died May 7, 1972, in Windsor, Nova Scotia.

== Awards and honors ==
Mosher was the first woman fellow of the Entomological Society of America, in 1920.
