= Association of Deans of Women and Advisers to Girls in Negro Schools =

The Association of Deans of Women and Advisers to Girls in Negro Schools (NAWDACS) was an advocacy group for black women within colleges and universities in the United States. Established through the efforts of Lucy Diggs Slowe in 1929, it lasted for twenty-five years until 1954, when it merged with the National Association of Personnel Deans and Advisers of Men in Negro Institutions.

== History ==
In March 1929, Lucy Diggs Stowe, founder of the National Association of College Women (NACW), convened at Howard University a NACW conference of deans and advisers to girls in Negro schools, which led to the founding of the Association. Five problems were identified as needing to be addressed: black women were under-represented on trustee boards and college administrations; properly qualified and salaried deans and advisers to girls were needed; female college students needed adequately equipped housing; female students needed properly planned extracurricular activity; and girls attending high school on college campuses needed separate housing and treatment.

Annual meetings were held at different black college campuses over the subsequent life of the association. Though Slowe served as president from 1929 to 1937, subsequent presidents held office for a shorter term: Georgia Myrtle Teale of Wilberforce University (1937–38); Hilda A. Davis of Talladega College (1938–39); Ina A. Bolton (1940–42); Flemmie P. Kittrell (1942–44); Mayme U. Foster (1944–46); T. Ruth Brett (1946–48); Emma C. W. Gray (1948–50); Virginia S. Nyabongo (1950–52); and Louise Latham (1952–54). From 1946 onwards the association held joint conferences with the National Association of Personnel Deans and Advisers of Men in Negro Institutions. The groups voted to merge in 1954, subsequently forming the National Association of Personnel Workers (NAPW).
