= Eunice Hilton =

- Born: November 19, 1899; Lincoln, Nebraska
- Died: October 18, 1975 (aged 75)
- Occupation: Dean of women (Syracuse University)

Martha Eunice Hilton (19 November 1899 - 18 October 1975) was dean of women for Syracuse University from 1935 for 1949. In this position she led the Student Dean Program for women, making many changes and improvements, leading to it becoming nationally renowned.

== Career ==
Eunice Hilton was born on 19 November 1899 in Lincoln, Nebraska. She attended Cotner College from 1917 to 1918 before receiving Bachelor's and master's degrees in physical education from the University of Nebraska. From 1926 she taught English and history at McCook Junior College in Nebraska, where she was also dean of women until 1931. In 1931, after graduating, Hilton travelled to Syracuse University, taking the position of assistant dean of women after completing a one-year student dean program. Alongside this position she worked on a doctorate in education, becoming the first woman to receive a PhD from the School of Education's Student Dean Program in April 1934.

When the then dean of women Eugenie Leonard went on leave 1935 Hilton assumed her role, temporarily at first, with the position becoming permanent in 1936. As dean of women, Hilton made many improvements to the university's Student Dean Program, including the introduction of new courses and a code of conduct. It became a nationally popular course, with applications made from around the United States. In 1943 she worked with others at the university to develop a course titled "The Status of Women and their Responsibilities" studying the roles of women in society; an early version of what would become women's studies. In 1949, Hilton stepped down as dean of women, instead taking the role of dean of the College of Home Economics, though she had less success here due to the declining interest in the field. Hilton moved to Denver where she worked at the University of Denver as a professor of education until her retirement in 1966.

During her career, Hilton took part in a number of other activities and held numerous other positions. She was president of the Council of Guidance and Personnel associations, a member of the New York state women's council, a vice-president of the National Association of Deans of Women, and spoke at a number of venues on the topic of deans of women, and women in academia more broadly.

In 1968 Syracuse University presented Hilton with an honorary degree, claiming that she had "contributed more to student personnel administration than anyone else in her time". Between 1992 and 2009 the university awarded a Hilton Scholarship Fund to one female graduate each year, named in her honour.

== Personal life ==
Hilton married John Thomas Freeland in 1959. She died from illness on 18 October 1975.
