= Flemmie Pansy Kittrell =

American nutritionist (1904–1980)

- Born: December 25, 1904; Henderson, North Carolina
- Died: October 3, 1980 (aged 75); Washington, D.C.
- Education: Hampton University, Cornell University
- Scientific career
- Fields: Home economics, nutrition
- Thesis: A study on negro infant feeding practices in a selected community of North Carolina

Flemmie Pansy Kittrell (December 25, 1904 – October 3, 1980) was the first African American woman to earn a Ph.D. in home economics. Her Ph.D. focused on nutritional interventions to address high Black mortality rates in the 1930s, and she was also the first African American woman to get a Ph.D. from Cornell University. She transformed the field of home economics in the United States and internationally through research and programming on adult nutrition, Black infant feeding practices, and the importance of preschool enrichment experiences for children. Her work was foundational to the development of Head Start, a national social program that provides early childhood education, health, and nutrition services to low-income children and families in the United States. Kittrell also served as an international ambassador, using home economics to address global malnutrition and poverty.

== Early life and education ==
Flemmie Pansy Kittrell was born to James and Alice Kittrell on December 25, 1904, in Henderson, North Carolina. Her parents, both sharecroppers, strongly believed in education and encouraged their children to excel academically. Her father often read stories and poems to the family of four girls and five boys.

At age 11, Kittrell began working as a maid and cook during summer breaks to support her education. In 1919, at fifteen years old, Kittrell enrolled at the Hampton Institute (now Hampton University) in Hampton, Virginia, for a "work year" to finance her studies alongside scholarships. She attended the high school program at Hampton from 1920 to 1924 and later earned a B.S. in Home Economics from the institution in 1928. Two of her siblings also graduated from the Hampton Institute.

Kittrell was initially interested in studying political science after high school, but a teacher encouraged her to consider home economics and shared the pioneering work of Ellen Henrietta Swallow Richards, the founder of home economics, who worked in sanitary engineering as one of the earliest female chemists, and was the first woman to be admitted to the Massachusetts Institute of Technology.

Encouraged by her professors, especially Thomas Wyatt Turner, Kittrell pursued graduate studies in home economics despite the barriers for Black women in higher education at the time. During a period when there were very few women or Black graduate students, she was awarded multiple scholarships to attend Cornell University. In 1929, Kittrell received the Julius Rosenwald Fund scholarship, as well as the Anna Cora Smith Fellowship awarded by the College of Home Economics at Cornell for her Master of Science. She was supported by a General Education Board fellowship (1933–1935) for her Ph.D.

Despite initially being denied on-campus housing at Cornell because she was Black, Kittrell successfully negotiated with Cornell's president to be allowed to live in a campus dormitory. During her time at Cornell she made important connections, including meeting her most influential mentor, child behavior specialist, Ethel B. Waring. Over this time, she also attended summer classes at Columbia University and began to connect with colleagues who worked at the League of Nations, which provided networks for her future work abroad.

After finishing her M.S. degree in 1930, Kittrell became, in 1936, the first African-American woman to earn a Ph.D. in home economics, as well as the first ever African-American woman to earn a Ph.D. from Cornell University. Her doctoral dissertation, A study on negro infant feeding practices in a selected community of North Carolina, examined high Black infant mortality rates and identified nutritional interventions such as improved milk formula use.

== Career ==
After she completed her undergraduate degree in 1928, Kittrell briefly taught at a high school before becoming the Dean of Students and the Director of Home Economics at Bennett College, a historically Black women's college in Greensboro, North Carolina. She remained in that role from 1928–1940, while simultaneously pursuing her graduate degrees at Cornell. She left Bennett College in 1940 to return to her alma mater, Hampton Institute, as a professor of Nutrition and Child Development, Dean of Women, and Director of the Department of Home Economics. Kittrell established nursery programs at Bennett and at Hampton in these roles, and then in her next role at Howard University, establishing all three over one decade.

In 1944, Kittrell left Hampton Institute to become head of the Home Economics Department at Howard University in Washington, D.C., where she remained for 30 years. There she developed a broader curriculum for home economics, including blending courses in other areas such as biology and engineering. In 1949, Kittrell was asked to act as a consultant on the Executive Committee of the 1950 Midcentury White House Conference for Children and Youth, which built on her previous involvement with U.S. government programs, such as Truman's 1946 school lunch program. Kittrell's interests in civil rights and family-focused policies aligned well with Truman's priorities at the time, and in 1960, she again attended the White House Conference on Children and Youth. Her influence was critical in the development of the Head Start program, which was launched in 1965.

In 1946, Kittrell began an international crusade to improve nutrition that continued for the remainder of her life, complementing her important work in the United States. She worked as an expert for the U.S. government and various missionary and peace groups beginning in 1946 when the State Department chose her to lead a group to Liberia to strengthen diplomatic ties through home economics. She completed substantial research, and found the diet of the people to be severely lacking in proteins and vitamins. Her reports on "hidden hunger", a type of malnutrition in people with full stomachs, led to many changes in the agricultural practices of Liberia and other countries. President Tubman of Liberia gave her an award for her service to the country.

Kittrell went on to draw from the United Nations Charter in her international advocacy. This work continued through her State Department connections and included the U.S. government Point Four Program, the Ford Foundation, the U.S. Information Service, and the U.S. Agency for International Development. In 1949, while serving as a Fulbright Scholar–one of the earliest Black women to receive this honor–Kittrell created a college-level training program for home economics in Baroda College, India.

In the United States, one of Kittrell's most significant contributions was the establishment of Howard University's Nursery School, which operated as a laboratory for early childhood education. Between 1944–1964 almost 500 children enrolled at Howard University's Nursery School, which became a model for preschool and early childhood research in the United States. Summer schools were held every second year over this period, providing workshops on child development and parent education, and Howard University became known throughout the world as a leader in nutrition and child development.

In 1963, Kittrell defined home economics as a "field of education which concerns itself with the activities of the home as a whole, and the organization and development of family life in all its aspects – physical, social, biological, and economic." More broadly, she promoted the idea that parenting is a skill that can be taught and learned, and that the family and home environments have a significant impact on child development.

Kittrell used both public and private funds to hold seminars on the latest nutritional research, to encourage women to seek advanced degrees, and to help other schools develop quality programs. The Howard early education laboratory eventually led to the pilot studies that informed the development of the federal Head Start program. Head Start is now administered by the United States Department of Health and Human Services and provides comprehensive early childhood education, health, nutrition, and parent involvement services to low-income children and families. The program operates in every state and some U.S. territories.

Kittrell believed that, amongst other things, home economics should be concerned with low-income and minority families in rural areas in the U.S. and abroad. This reflects her strong commitment to equal opportunity demonstrated throughout her career. She advocated that children be given opportunities and could be successful irrespective of their class, gender, or race. For example, her research showed that illnesses experienced by Black Americans were not due to individual decision-making, but rather racial discrimination in housing, employment, and medical services. This was especially important around the time of the 1965 Moynihan Report, when there was limited awareness of the link between health outcomes and socioeconomic status. In an early organizational meeting focused on Head Start, she was able to clarify the importance of such an initiative focusing on low-income families, providing an important contrasting perspective to the Moynihan Report.

Kittrell continued to travel widely on behalf of state-based and non-governmental organizations to countries such as Sweden, Uganda, Ghana, Kenya, Sudan, the Congo, South Africa, Bangladesh, and Russia. She was a delegate at international meetings for the Women's International League for Peace and Freedom (WILPF), the American Home Economics Association (AHEA), the International Missionary Council in Willingen, and the United Nations Educational, Scientific and Cultural Organization (UNESCO). She was also a member of the National Council of Negro Women (NCNW) and after her trip to Liberia, was made the chair of WILPF's Committee of African Affairs.

Kittrell also used her research trips to compile the American Home Economics Association cookbook, Favorite Recipes from the United Nations. Media coverage of this work described Kittrell as a "goodwill ambassador with a cookbook." This description captures her powerful work as both a U.S. ambassador, but also as an ambassador for peace, nutrition, women, and people of color.

Kittrell continued to set up home economics programs in the U.S. and abroad, including a program at Howard University to recruit students from other countries. She also lobbied for a new Home Economics building at Howard, which opened in 1963 and was named in her honor. It was designed by Kittrell and included costume displays, nutrition laboratories, classrooms, a library, study centers, an auditorium, a preschool parent center, a cafeteria, and a living room with African, Indian, Japanese and U.S. decor inspired by her work abroad.

Kittrell's research on early childhood education and nutrition was integral to the creation of the Head Start program, which was a key part of President Lyndon B. Johnson's War on Poverty in the 1960s Continuing since 1965, the Head Start Program has been utilized by 38 million children in the United States. Eligible families can participate from birth to age 5, and can receive services in early learning and development, health and wellness, and family wellbeing and engagement for free, providing important support to low-income families and communities. The benefits from participating in the program are multigenerational and include being more likely to graduate from high school and attend college, improved development and wellbeing outcomes, and improving parenting skills.

With the disestablishment of home economics as a discipline, male child psychologists are more commonly credited for developing programs such as Head Start. However, the early child development labs that Kittrell established and led were foundational to the Head Start model. She personally trained over 2,000 Head Start workers and played a key tole in creating the program's instructional manuals.

After her retirement in 1972, Kittrell continued to work as a consultant and lecturer in various settings. In 1973, Howard made her a Professor Emerita in the Department of Human Ecology, a position she held until her death in 1980. She completed a fellowship in the College of Human Ecology from 1974–1976, and then worked as a Senior Research Fellow at the Moton Center for Independent Studies in Philadelphia in 1977.

== Awards and legacy ==
Kittrell left behind a legacy of global impact in nutrition, early childhood education, and social justice. Her contributions remain foundational to Head Start, global nutrition programs, and the field of home economics.

Throughout her career, Kittrell was widely recognized for her important work. In 1946, she received the Office of Price Administration Award from President Truman for her contributions to the Price Control Program. She received the Scroll of Honor from the National Council of Negro Women in 1950 and 1963, the Hampton Alumni Award in 1955, an achievement degree from Cornell in 1972, and an honorary degree of Doctor of Humane Letters from the University of North Carolina in Greensboro for her contributions to home economics.

The American Home Economics Association created a scholarship in Kittrell's name, and in 2017, the Cornell Graduate School created the Turner Kittrell Medal of Honor for alumni who have made "significant national or international contributions to the advancement of diversity, inclusion and equity in academia, industry or the public sector". Since 2023, Cornell's Human Ecology department has honored her through the Flemmie Kittrell Visiting Scholar Program. In October 2024, Hampton University opened Flemmie P Kittrell Hall as part of the School of Pharmacy.

== Personal life ==
While Kittrell was a student at Hampton in 1919, her father died, and just two weeks later, her older sister Mabel died of pellagra, a disease caused by a niacin (vitamin B3) deficiency. Pellagra was widespread among Black Americans in the Southern United States in the early 20th century, particularly affecting low-income agricultural workers with limited access to adequate nutrition. While Kittrell did not discuss these deaths publicly, her lifelong commitment to nutrition, public health, and home economics suggests that these tragedies deeply influenced her career path.

Kittrell was a private person, carefully navigating race, gender, and political tensions while using her expertise in home economics to advance anti-racism, women's rights, and social justice. Due to her perceived association with the Peace movement and Civil Rights movement, the FBI maintained a file on her. However, her effective ambassadorial skills meant that she was able to continue to travel for work even in periods of significant geopolitical tension, such as during the Cold War.

Kittrell died unexpectedly of cardiac arrest at Howard University on October 1, 1980, in Washington, D.C. She was 75 years old.
