= Mari Ruef Hofer =

American pioneer in children's music education (1858–1929)

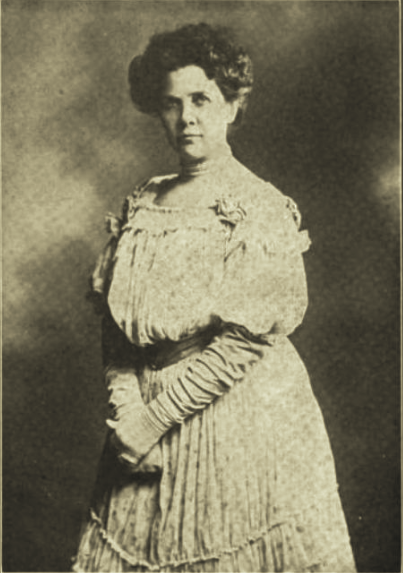
- Mari Ruef Hofer in a 1907 magazine.
- Born: 1858/59; Iowa, U.S.
- Died: 1929
- Education: Mount Carroll Seminary; University of Chicago
- Occupations: educator; composer; writer; lecturer
- Movement: settlement movement; playground movement; pioneer in the kindergarten movement

Mari Ruef Hofer (1858/59–1929) was an American educator, composer, writer, and lecturer. Along with her sisters, she was a pioneer in the kindergarten movement. She gained familiary with discipline through her work in music rhythms and games. Hofer was the author of song books and books about dance.

== Early life and education ==
Mari Ruef Hofer was born July 18, 1858/9, in Iowa. (Note: According to Leonard (1914), Mari was born in James, Iowa, while according to Haeussler (1952), Mari was born in Littleport, Iowa.) Her parents were Andreas Franz and Marianna (Ruef) Hofer. She was of German ancestry.

She was educated at Mount Carroll Seminary in Illinois, graduating in Music and Literature. She also studied at the University of Chicago.

== Career ==
Her first work was the supervision of public school music in La Crosse, Wisconsin. From there she went to Chicago, pursuing her teaching in the public schools of that city, and finally becoming interested in and specializing in the kindergarten work. Here she gave normal training in music in the Chicago Kindergarten College, the Chicago Free Kindergarten Association, the training school of the Chicago Commons, besides lecturing in the leading training schools of the country. Her last public school work was the successful organizing of Music and Games in Rochester, New York.

From Rochester, she came to Teachers College, Columbia University, in New York City, where she became established, both as Extension Lecturer for the College and in the New York Public School Lecture Course. She was also Instructor of Music in the New York Froebel Normal and a regular member of the faculty of the Summer School of the South, at Knoxville, Tennessee. Hofer also taught at Chautauqua, University of California, Berkeley, University of Virginia, and University of Tennessee.

Hofer was the author of Music for the Child World (three vols.); Popular Folk Games and Dances; Singing Games, Old and New; Children's Messiah; Bethlehem-Nativity Play; and Polite and social dances; a collection of historic dances, Spanish, Italian, French, English, German, American; with historical sketches, descriptions of the dances and instructions for their performance. Her collection entitled, Popular Folk Games and Dances, came after years of devotion to the service of song and play, their affect in the developing life of childhood, and the need of extending their influence to those of mature years. The selections were made with a judgment that came after long familiarity with the subject. She published valuable compilations of music for use in the kindergarten, Sunday School and the playground. She contributed to the "Playground" number of Charities and the Commons.

Hofer's special interests included was interested in the settlement movement, playground work, and public recreation for people in the form of festivals, pageants, and civic music. She devoted all her leisure to the arranging of plays and games for festivals and playground work. Her interests also included internationalism and less conceit in Americanisms, believing we would gain in culture by knowing other people better. She read and translated German and credited her interest and large acquaintance with folklore and traditions to this source. Her recreations included singing folk songs and folk dancing. She felt that the resources of other eras and countries brought enrichment of life in our own country; and now we are trying to possess ourselves of the joy and spirit in the folk games and dances of many nations.

Hofer was a member of the Chicago Woman's Club, Ridge Woman's Club, City Club of Chicago, and Fellowship House Club.

== Death ==
Mari Ruef Hofer died in 1929.

== Selected works ==
- Camp Recreations and Pageants (1927) (text)
- Children's Messiah (1908)
- Children's Singing Games, Old and New, for vacation schools, play grounds, etc. (1901)
- Christmas in Peasant France (1915)
- Christmasse in Merrie England: With Old Carols, Dances and a Masque (1915) (text)]
- Music for the Child World (three vols.). Music editor of Vols. I. and II., Calvin B. Cady; music editor of Vol. III., Fannie L. Gwinner Cole. (1900-1902) (text) (text)
- Old Tunes, New Rimes, and Games for Kindergarten and Primary Grades (1917) (text)
- Polite and social dances; a collection of historic dances, Spanish, Italian, French, English, German, American; with historical sketches, descriptions of the dances and instructions for their performance (1917)
- Popular Folk Games and Dances (1923) (text)
- Seasonal Festivals and Pageants: Harvest Festival (1916) (text)
- The Story of Bethlehem, a Beautiful Nativity Play (1916)
