= Creal Springs Seminary =

- Creal Springs, Illinois; United States

Information
- Established: September 22, 1884
- Closed: December 24, 1916
- Principal: Gertrude Brown Murrah

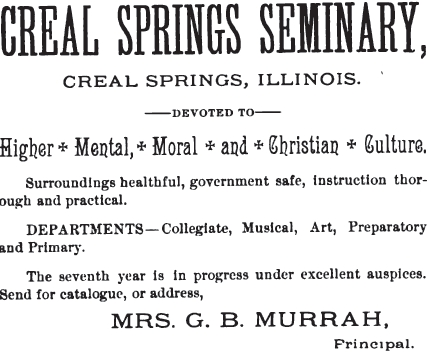
Advertisement for the Creal Springs Seminary from 1891

The Creal Springs Seminary, later known as the Creal Springs College and Conservatory of Music, was an educational institution in Creal Springs, Illinois, USA from 1884 to 1916. It was headed by Principal Gertrude Brown Murrah, a graduate of the Mount Carroll Seminary in Mount Carroll, Illinois. The school was built as a three-story frame building on a five-acre site on the north edge of town, on land acquired from the Creal family by Mrs. Murrah and her husband Henry Clay Murrah. It opened on September 22, 1884, and was chartered in August 1888 by the State of Illinois as Creal Springs Seminary Company.

The school was originally planned to be for girls only, but due to high demand from boy students it opened as coeducational. At the end of the first 12-week term, there were a total of 59 students enrolled. The faculty had six members including Mr and Mrs Murrah. The program was divided into primary, preparatory, college-level and music departments.

In January 1894, the name of the school was changed by charter from Creal Springs Seminary to Creal Springs College and Conservatory of Music. Both bachelor's and master's degrees were provided. The faculty at this point numbered 15, with approximately 100 students enrolled.

In 1902, the library had 400 volumes. The faculty and students jointly published a quarterly magazine called the Erina Star.

The school closed on December 24, 1916. Mrs Murrah continually struggled to reopen the school until her death in 1929. The building was demolished in 1943.

== Alumni ==
- Mary L. Moreland (1859-1918), minister, evangelist, suffragist, author

== Bibliography ==
- Stan J. Hale (ed.). "Creal Springs College". Williamson County Centennial History. p. 137.
- Creal Springs School. "History of Creal Springs Seminary". Archived from the original on July 27, 2011.
