= Anne Dudley Blitz =

American college administrator

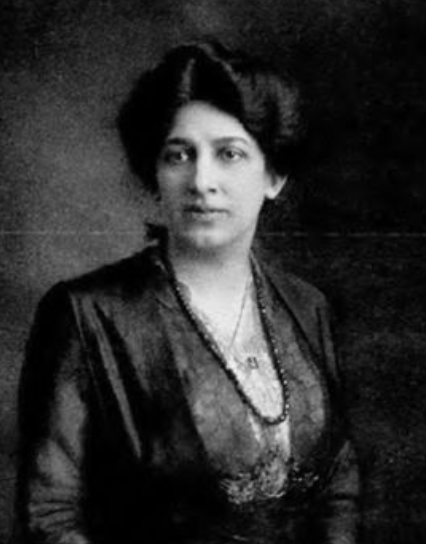
- Anne Dudley Blitz, from the 1916 yearbook of William Smith College
- Born: January 27, 1881; Minneapolis, Minnesota
- Died: February 18, 1951 (aged 70); Minneapolis, Minnesota
- Occupation: College administrator
- Known for: Dean of Women at University of Kansas (1921-1923), University of Minnesota (1923-1949)

Anne Dudley Blitz (January 27, 1881 – February 18, 1951) was an American college administrator. She was the first Dean of Women at the University of Kansas from 1921 to 1923, and Dean of Women at the University of Minnesota from 1923 to 1949.

== Early life and education ==
Anne Dudley Blitz was born in Minneapolis, Minnesota, the daughter of Adolph Blitz and Anna Dudley Wickes Blitz. Her father was a German-born eye doctor. She graduated from the University of Minnesota in 1904. She pursued further studies in the School of Practical Arts at Teachers College, Columbia University, where she earned a master's degree in 1914, and helped create An Outline on the History of Cookery (1915), with Anna Barrows and Bertha Shapleigh.

Blitz was a member of Phi Beta Kappa. She and her mother were members of the Daughters of the American Revolution.

== Career ==
Blitz taught English at a high school in Boise, Idaho after college. From 1915 to 1919 Blitz was dean of William Smith College. She was the first Dean of Women at the University of Kansas from 1921 to 1923. She was the Dean of Women the University of Minnesota from 1923 to 1949. She opposed desegregated campus housing at Minnesota, bringing her into conflict college president Guy Stanton Ford.

Blitz was an early leader of the National Association of Deans of Women, and active in the AAUW. In 1936, she exhibited her handmade jewelry in St. Cloud.

== Personal life ==
Blitz was known for her collection of pets, including the six Pekingese puppies who often spent the work day in her campus office in 1945. She also collected glassware and furniture. She died two weeks after suffering a heart attack in 1951, in Minneapolis, aged 70 years.
