= National Association for Women in Education =

NGO in United States

The National Association for Women in Education (formerly known as The National Association of Deans of Women, the National Association of Women Deans and Counselors, and the National Association of Women Deans, Administrators, and Counselors) was an American organization founded in 1916 by Kathryn Sisson Phillips to support female deans of women.

The organization closed in September 2000 when it merged with the National Association of Student Personnel Administrators.

== History ==
=== Formation ===
Following large increases in the number of women in higher education in the late nineteenth century, the number of deans of women also grew, establishing it as a professional occupation. In 1913 a graduate study program was created at Teachers College, Columbia University for deans of women. Realising that an organisation was needed to coordinate training and connections for deans, in 1915 Kathryn Sisson Phillips initiated informal meetings for the 26 women studying for the position at Teachers College for discussions, with their first formal meeting occurring at a meeting of the National Education Association on July 6, 1916. The association had begun publishing a yearbook by 1923 and a scholarly journal in 1938, the latter of which was edited by Ruth Strang.

=== Operation ===
While operating as the National Association of Deans of Women, the organization conducted research, administered scholarships, and published pamphlets concerning female students and deans of women. By 1935, a separate group for African American students known as the Association of Deans of Women and Advisers to Girls in Negro Colleges and Schools had also been established. After World War II the association advocated and lobbied organisations and higher learning institutions to retain and hire women in policy-making positions. By the 1950s the organisation ran an annual meeting, a journal, and had over 1500 members. In 1951 the association's members voted to retain their autonomy and focus on women and in 1953 worked with the American Council on Education to establish a Commission on the Education of Women, which was later disbanded in 1962.

In 1956 then president Eunice Hilton announced that the organisation was being renamed to the National Association of Women Deans and Counselors. The 1960s saw the association's highest level of membership, with the organisation continuing to push for women's rights and equality. In 1971 the members again voted on the topic of merging with other education associations, with the result of remaining single-gender. By 1973, however, the organisation had decided to broaden its scope to other educational professions following the enactment of Title IX, renaming to the National Association of Women Deans, Administrators, and Counselors and began allowing men to join.

In 1975 the association became the first organization in the United States to pass a resolution which refused to hold its conferences in states which hadn't ratified the equal rights amendment. By 1989 the association had taken on sole responsibility for the National Conference for College Women Student Leaders, which provided support, networking, and awards for collegiate women, and continued to publish its journal Initiatives as well as running conferences including this one.

In September 1990 the association voted to change their name to the National Association for Women in Education, an alteration which was implemented at the association's 75th anniversary conference in 1991. Marriot Management Services gave the association $125,000 in April 1996 to assist "the development and implementation of innovative leadership training programs for women within [education]" which led to the creation of the Institute for Emerging Women Leaders in Higher Education. In 1999 the association ran their first International Conference on Women in Higher Education, having taken it over from the University of Texas at El Paso.

=== Closure ===
Increased competition from other associations, a lack of funding, and a decrease in single-sex organisations contributed to the association deciding to cease operating in 2000. It left behind considerable funding to continue to support the National Conference for College Women Student Leaders.

=== Notable members ===
- Anne Dudley Blitz, Dean of Women at the University of Minnesota (1923 to 1949) and University of Kansas (1921 to 1923)
- Una B. Herrick, on the membership committee of the National Association of Deans of Women and was member of the Deans of Women Western Conference
- Lillias MacDonald, first Dean of Women at the University at Buffalo
- Kate Hevner Mueller, editor of the NAWDAC Journal, 1960–1969.
- A. Evelyn Newman, chair of the NADW, 1927
