= Quarterly Journal of Speech =

- Discipline: Rhetoric, Communication Studies
- Language: English

Publication details
- History: 1915-present
- Publisher: Taylor & Francis on behalf of the National Communication Association
- Frequency: Quarterly

Standard abbreviations
- ISO 4: Q. J. Speech

Indexing
- ISSN: 0033-5630 (print); 1479-5779 (web)

Links
- Journal homepage

The Quarterly Journal of Speech (QJS) is a quarterly peer-reviewed academic journal published by Taylor & Francis on behalf of the National Communication Association. QJS publishes original scholarship and book reviews that take a rhetorical approach to diverse texts, discourses, and cultural practices through which public beliefs, norms, identities, institutions, affects, and actions are constituted, empowered, enacted, and circulated. Rhetorical scholarship traverses and mobilizes many different intellectual, archival, disciplinary, and political vectors, traditions, and methods, and QJS seeks to honor and engage such differences.

Accordingly, QJS welcomes the full array of scholarship produced under rhetoric's broad purview, including work that advances and enriches longstanding traditions in rhetorical theory and criticism, as well as research and writing that maps new frontiers.

== Abstracting and indexing ==
The journal is abstracted and indexed in

- America: History and Life
- CSA Worldwide Political Science Abstracts
- Communication Abstracts
- Communication and Mass Media Complete
- Current Abstracts
- ERIC
- Electronic Collections Online
- Education Research Index
- Historical Abstracts
- Humanities Index
- Humanities International Index
- Linguistics Abstracts
- Linguistics and Language Behavior Abstracts
- MLA International Bibliography
- Periodicals Index Online
- SCOPUS
- Social Services Abstracts
- Social Science Citation Index
- Sociological Abstracts
