= Lambda Sigma =

American collegiate honor society

- ΛΣ
- Founded: November 7, 1922; 103 years ago University of Pittsburgh
- Type: Honor
- Affiliation: ACHS
- Status: Active
- Emphasis: Second-Year College Students
- Scope: National
- Motto: "Leadership. Scholarship. Fellowship. Service"
- Colors: Blue and Gold
- Publication: The Diamond; The Tide (through 1976)
- Chapters: 38
- Former name: Society of Cwens
- Headquarters: c/o Neal Edman, Executive Secretary; 2509 North Mercer Street; New Castle, Pennsylvania 16105; United States
- Website: www.lambdasigma.org

Lambda Sigma (ΛΣ) is an American college honor society for second-year students. Originally named the Society of Cwens, the society was established at the University of Pittsburgh in 1922 as a women's honors society and became a national organization in 1925. The society is "dedicated to the purpose of fostering leadership, scholarship, fellowship, and the spirit of service among college students, and to promoting the interests of the college or university in every possible way".

== History ==
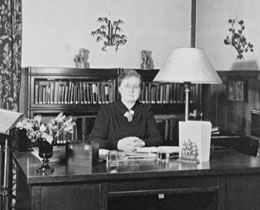
University of Pittsburgh Dean Thyrsa Amos, founder of the Society of Cwens.

=== Society of Cwens ===
In the early 1920s, Thyrsa Amos, dean of women at the University of Pittsburgh, saw the need for a society for outstanding sophomore women. She met with students Elizabeth Zeigler and Jean Ballou on November 3, 1922 to discuss the idea. At an organizational on November 7, 1922, twelve sophomore women responded to invitations and met at Heinz House, electing to found Society of Cwens to sponsor activities for all freshmen and sophomore women and to "select for membership in the spring those freshman women who displayed the finest Pitt spirit, showed good scholarship and expressed interest in activities through fine participation in them".

The founding members of the Society of Cwens were Jean G. Ballou, Agnes T. Hewitt, Elizabeth Highberger, Louise M. Hoge, Theresa Kahn, Frances M. Koenig, Stella Mulligan, Mildred Pickrell, Margaret Porch, Elizabeth D. Seville, Sarah M. Stoughton, and Elizabeth G. Zeigler. Hewitt was the society's first chair.

The group's name, Society of Cwens, come from the word cwēn, meaning "lady" or "queen" in Anglo-Saxon. Its emblem selected was a golden crown resting upon a scepter. Its motto was "Always on Duty".

The Cwens became a national organization with the 1925 establishment of chapters at Miami University and the University of Missouri. The first Society of Cwens held its first conference in May 1925 on the Miami campus.

A charter was obtained to certify Cwens as a national organization; a petition was submitted, and on June 16, 1926, the certificate of incorporation was approved and the charter of the National Society of Cwens was recorded in the Common Pleas Court of Allegheny County. Titles of officers in the organization were given Anglo-Saxon names, and a national convention, called the Witan, was held twice annually, rotating among the colleges and universities having Cwen chapters. The society's publication was called The Tid.

The 1972 Witan, held in Pittsburgh on the campus of Duquesne University, observed the fiftieth anniversary of the society and concluded with a "feast" in the Cathedral of Learning at the University of Pittsburgh. This ceremony, detailed in Hydan-Bok, the Cwen book of rituals, is a revered event in the history of the organization.

=== Lambda Sigma ===
In 1975, the Title IX Education Amendments mandated the abolishment of single-sex organizations in institutions of higher learning. In October 1975, Cwens chapter presidents authorized the national executive board to disband the society and to formulate plans for a national sophomore honor society for both men and women. The national board disbanded the National Society of Cwens and founded the Lambda Sigma Society as a direct descendant of the society on March 6, 1976.

Lambda Sigma Society retains the Society of Cwens's goal of fostering leadership, scholarship, fellowship, and service.

== Symbols ==
Lambda Sigma's Greek letters were selected to represent the ideals of Leadership and Scholarship. Its insignia is a diamond-shaped gold pin that has a royal blue field, bearing the Greek letters "ΛΣ" in gold. The diamond shape symbolized "strength of purpose".

Lambda Sigma's motto is "Leadership. Scholarship. Fellowship. Service". The society's colors are blue and gold, representing truth and honor. Its publication is The Diamond.

== Membership ==
Membership in any chapter may not exceed fifty students or ten percent of the freshman class – whichever is lower. Students who achieve GPA within at least the top 35 percent of the class at the time of selection are eligible for selection in the spring term following their completion of at least one academic term. These new members selected to Lambda Sigma become active during their second year.

== Chapters ==
Lambda Sigma has 39 active chapters.
