= Anna J. Hamilton =

American journalist

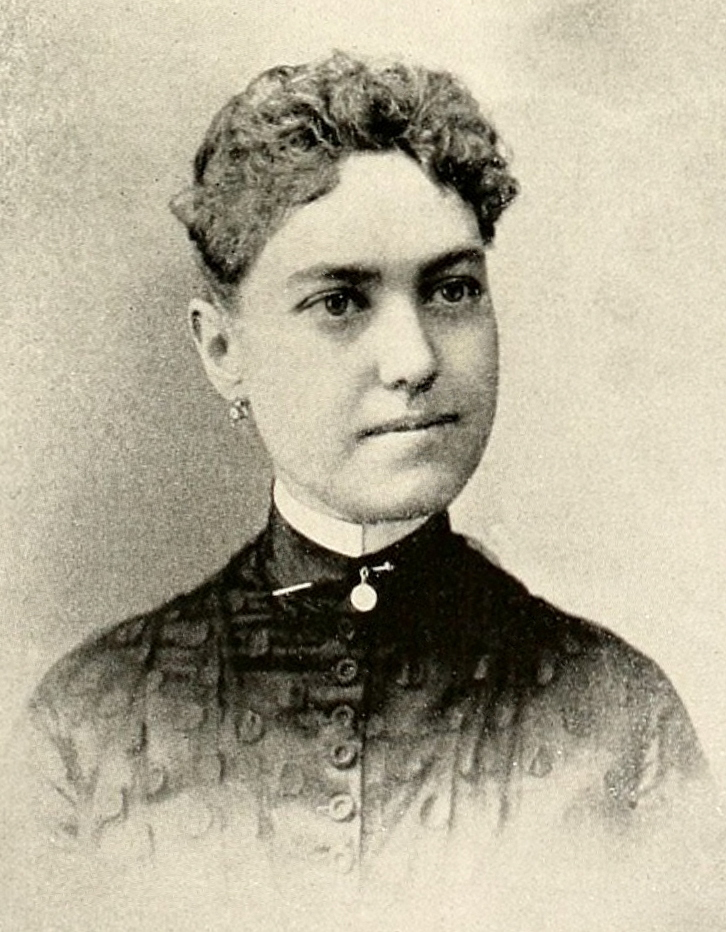
Anna J. Hamilton

Anna J. Hamilton (April 20, 1860 – October 18, 1922) was an American educator, journalist, writer, and editor from the U.S. state of Kentucky. She was one of the editors for Kentucky on "A Woman of the Century", and was engaged in editorial work on the "National encyclopedia of America". Hamilton served as principal of Semple Collegiate School in Louisville, after taking over its management in 1900, along with Annie Moore.

== Biography ==
Anna J. Hamilton was born in Louisville on April 20, 1860. She was descended on the maternal side from the old Kentucky family of Caldwells, and on the paternal side from the Hamiltons, of Pennsylvania. She was educated in the public schools of Louisville and was graduated from the girls' high school.

Hamilton served as chair in the Normal School, being known as an enthusiastic educator. She was a writer of both prose and poetry. Her poems were published in the local journals and in various periodicals. Much of her time was on editorial work. For a year, she edited the children's column in a prominent educational journal. She was one of the editors for Kentucky on "A Woman of the Century", and was engaged in editorial work on the "National Encyclopedia of America". She was a member of the library committee from Kentucky for the World's Fair. The committee purpose was to establish a woman's library, and she collected and contributed all the volumes written by the women of Kentucky.

She was a member of the Filson Club, and the Daughters of the American Revolution.

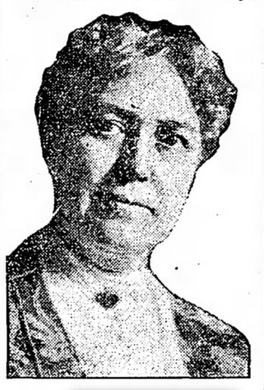
Anna J. Hamilton (1922)

She died October 18, 1922, Newark, New Jersey.
