= Mount Carroll Seminary =

Former name of Shimer College

Coordinates: 42.09245°N 89.97710°W

The Mount Carroll Seminary was the name of Shimer College from 1853 to 1896. The Seminary was located in Mount Carroll, Illinois, in the United States. A pioneering institution in its time and place, the Mount Carroll Seminary served as a center of culture and education in 19th-century northwestern Illinois. Despite frequent prognostications of failure, it grew from 11 students in a single room to more than 100 students on a spacious campus with four principal buildings. Unusually for the time, the school was governed entirely by women, most notably the founder Frances Wood Shimer, who was the chief administrator throughout the Seminary's entire existence.

== Establishment ==
Miss Wood had nothing at the time in her own right, but an indomitable will and determination.

— The History of Carroll County, 1878

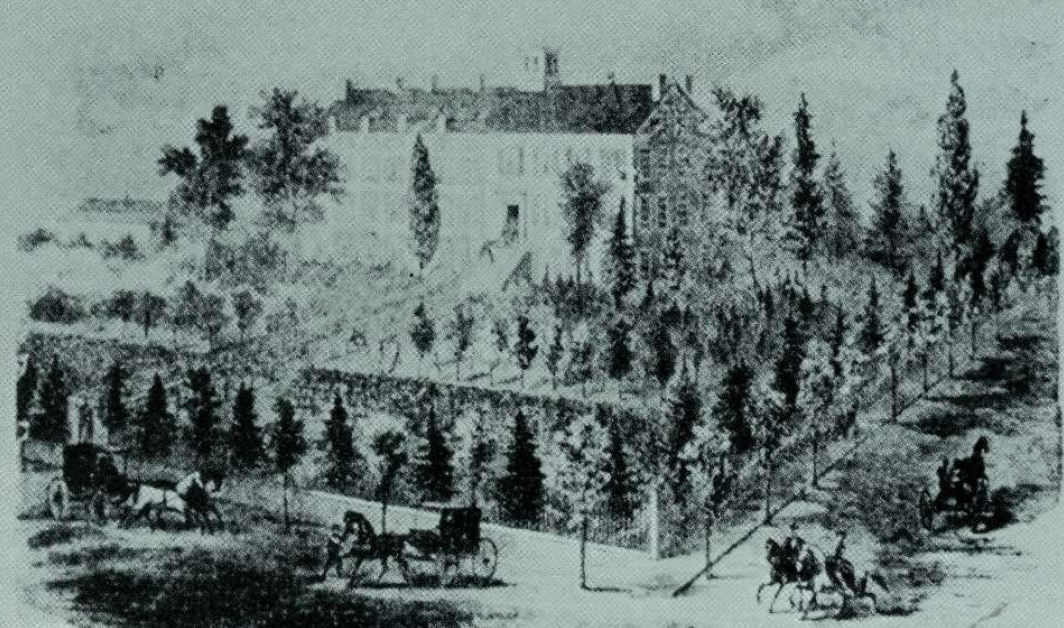
Earliest known drawing of the Seminary, from 1867.

The Mount Carroll Seminary was established before there were any graded public schools in Mount Carroll, and at a time when the need for education was not widely perceived by the pioneer population. In the 1850s, along with the nationwide boom in primary education, there was also a trend towards women's higher education through seminaries and normal schools, particularly in the Midwest. However, such institutions were considered an unusual phenomenon in western Illinois. At the time there were few teacher training institutions in the region at all, and there was widespread opposition to higher education for women. In addition, the novelty of women succeeding in business was a source of considerable hostility from the local community. From the time of its founding, there were frequent predictions that the seminary would fail.

The charter for the Mount Carroll Seminary was granted by the Illinois General Assembly on June 18, 1852. This act had been drafted by Judge John Wilson, then clerk of the Carroll County court and a strong advocate of education, and was submitted by State Representative William T. Miller of Mount Carroll. The original board of trustees had nine members including Wilson.

The Seminary now existing on paper, it was necessary to find teachers. Judge Wilson corresponded with Isaac Nash, a wealthy farmer in Saratoga County, New York. Boarding in Nash's house at the time were Frances Wood (later Frances Shimer) and Cindarella Gregory, recent graduates of the New York State Normal School. Wood was at the time suffering from tuberculosis, and seeking a change of climate. The two were persuaded to be the founding teachers of the new seminary.

Upon the arrival of Gregory and Wood in Mount Carroll, classes began in a single room in the Presbyterian church on May 11, 1853, with 11 students. Enrollment rose in the course of the year, and the school moved to another temporary location in the more substantial Ashway Building. When the school opened in its own building in October 1854, there were 75 students. The Seminary now having teachers and students as well as a legal existence, it was necessary for it to have a physical location. To this end a system of funding by subscription was used, with $5 shares being offered as investments that would bear 6% interest "until dividends shall be declared by the board of trustees, out of profits arising from said seminary." 548 shares were subscribed, which would have amounted to $2,740; however, less than half of this amount ($960.75) was ever collected in cash. Five acres were acquired at a cost of $500 although the land had previously been valued at only $7.50 per acre; the asking price skyrocketed as soon as the intent of building the seminary there was suspected. The seminary building was constructed at a cost of $4,500, largely on credit. Additional debts were incurred for the furnishings, purchased by Wood and Gregory in New York for approximately $2,000. This growing level of debt was a source of substantial discouragement to the incorporators.

== Governance ==
She has asked no board of trustees to advise with their counsel — only to confound and distract.

— Jeriah Bonham, 1883

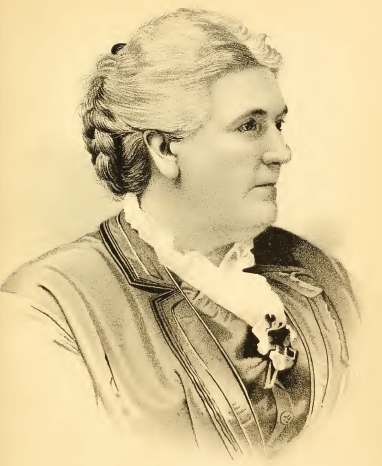
Frances Shimer, founder of the school and proprietor or co-proprietor from 1855 to 1896

The school was not formally organized under its charter until October 1854, the initial "patronage" relationship between the incorporators and Shimer and Gregory having been informal in nature. Upon organization the Seminary was formally governed by a Board of Trustees, the nine incorporators named in the 1852 charter. However, this arrangement was short-lived.

In 1855, fearing that the school would fail due to the lack of subscription revenue, the incorporators sold their shares in the college to the teachers, Wood and Gregory. This was arranged under favorable terms, with the land donated and the buildings sold at cost, on the condition that Wood and Gregory continue operating the school for at least 10 years. The transfer took effect on March 30, 1855. On February 25, 1867, the school was re-chartered by the state legislature to reflect the new arrangement.

From 1853 to 1896, Frances Shimer was the chief executive of the school; although her title was "Principal", she is conventionally regarded as the first president of Shimer College. Initially the governance of the school was in partnership with co-proprietor Cindarella Gregory, who served as the chief academic officer while Frances oversaw the finances. In July 1870, the partnership ended, when Gregory left the school to marry. The Mount Carroll Seminary subsequently remained the sole property of Frances Wood Shimer until her retirement in 1896.

Frances Shimer's exacting oversight was credited with the survival of the school. Her observance of strict economy in business affairs kept the school solvent. For most of her administration, the seminary made no effort to either recruit students or solicit donations, focusing all energy on creating a school that would "merit confidence". In retrospect, the governance of Frances Shimer and her successor William Parker McKee was looked on as a period of unparalleled calm and stability in the history of Shimer College.

== People ==
=== Proprietors and notable faculty ===
- Principal Frances Shimer was co-proprietor with Cinderella Gregory until 1870 and sole proprietor from 1870 to 1896. She was also a teacher in the initial years, but as administrative demands mounted academics were largely left to co-Principal Gregory and later Associate Principal Joy. However, she maintained a strong personal presence in the Labor Department, and oversaw all new construction and planting on the campus.
- Principal Cinderella Gregory, also often spelled Cindarella, served as co-proprietor with Frances Shimer until departing the Seminary in 1870, when she sold her shares to Frances Shimer.
- Associate Principal Adelia C. Joy joined the Seminary in 1870 and took Cinderella Gregory's place as chief academic officer. Over time, as Frances Shimer advanced in age, Joy came to play an increasingly central role in the school's financial affairs as well.
- Henry Shimer, a physician and naturalist, served for a time following the completion of his medical degree in 1866 as an instructor of natural sciences at the Seminary. He had married Seminary founder Frances Shimer on December 22, 1857.
- Isabel Dearborn Hazzen, also known as Mrs B.F. Dearborn Hazzen, was the director of the music program and widely known for her skills in teaching music. She became associated with the seminary in the late 1860s.

=== Alumni ===
- Alice Ives Breed, graduated in 1871; social leader, salon holder, clubwoman
- Dr. Blanche Moore Haines (1865–1944), physician; Michigan State chair of the National Woman Suffrage Association
- Mari Ruef Hofer (1858/59-1929), composer, lecturer, teacher, writer
- Gertrude Brown Murrah graduated from the Seminary in 1885 and went on to found the Creal Springs Seminary, later known as the Creal Springs College and Conservatory of Music, located in Creal Springs, Illinois, which thrived for a time but closed in 1916 due to financial difficulties.
- Samuel W. McCall, governor of Massachusetts, studied at the Seminary from 1864 to 1866, when he was forced to transfer due to the school being closed to male students.
- Mary E. Metzgar, temperance activist
- Sarah Hackett Stevenson, first female member of the American Medical Association

== Academics ==
Not cramming for examinations, but preparing for the real duties of life, was the standard of excellence.

— Winona B. Sawyer, 1901

A formal course of study was adopted in 1860. The Mount Carroll Seminary thereafter functioned similarly to a preparatory school, with a six-year course of study that could lead the pupil to more advanced study. Some graduates were prepared sufficiently well that they could skip the first years of college. Subjects taught included mathematics, natural science, and classical languages.

In the early 1870s, the seminary went through a transitional period, and specialized courses of study began to be provided, staffed by specialized instructors. The specialized departments of the school included a normal department which trained schoolteachers, and a music department. An 1882 survey divided the 11 graduates from that year into those from the normal program, the collegiate program, the music program and the art program.

The normal department prepared students to become schoolteachers, which was widely regarded as the only proper occupation for a woman outside the home. The demand for teachers trained by the Seminary was high. At the end of each term, large numbers of the seminary's students found immediate employment in teaching, even without formally graduating; in 1877, it was reported that 30 of those enrolled the previous term had found teaching positions. The normal department program followed the teachings of David Perkins Page, an influential pedagogical theorist who had also been principal of the New York State Normal School when Frances Wood and Cindarella Gregory attended.

The music and arts programs were a significant attraction of the seminary. The seminary had the first piano in Carroll County. The seminary's music program began with only 3 students, but grew rapidly. By 1877, the music department had 6 instructors, and by 1883, the conservatory held nearly 40 instruments. The music program in this period was overseen by Isabel Dearborn Hazzen, a voice instructor who became well known in the area. The music and arts programs remained strong even after the seminary became the Frances Shimer Academy of the University of Chicago in 1896. By the 1870s, there was also a literary department.

In 1878, a department of telegraphy was established, with a single instructor. This was intended to provide the students with an option of a self-sustaining career other than teaching.

== Admissions and financial aid ==
In Mrs. Shimer's estimation, one of the best credentials a pupil could furnish was proof of a desire for an education, a lack of money to meet expenses, and a willingness to help herself.

— Winona B. Sawyer, 1901

Advertisement from an 1888 Unitarian, emphasizing the financial aid available.

The seminary accepted any pupil who was willing to learn, and is said to have welcomed pupils as young as three. Frances Shimer herself had begun school at the age of two and a half. During and after the US Civil War, female enrollment rose while male enrollment fell. Facing space constraints due to rising demand, the formerly coeducational seminary limited residential study to women in 1866, although some men were still allowed as day students. Despite an expressed intent to reopen the school to male students, it remained a women's school throughout the seminary period and did not become coeducational again until the modern Shimer College program was established in 1950.

Financial aid included the equivalent of work study. The school included a Labor Department that gave students the opportunity to work off their tuition obligations. Some male students were also accepted for these positions, and were assigned to special lodgings.

Outright scholarships were also available for certain classes of students. A full scholarship to the normal department was provided for one teacher from each township of Carroll County, and one teacher from each county in the state. Full scholarships were also provided to the daughters of soldiers who died in the Civil War, and partial scholarships to daughters of clergymen. In addition, scholarships were sometimes provided to the children of creditors by way of payment.

Financial aid also sometimes took the form of loans. Credit was extended to "pupils of creditable scholarship", allowing them to pay a portion of their tuition with notes that drew no interest for a year.

Enrollment rose gradually but steadily through the 19th century, constrained largely by the available space. In the 1870s, it averaged 125 students per year.

== Student life ==
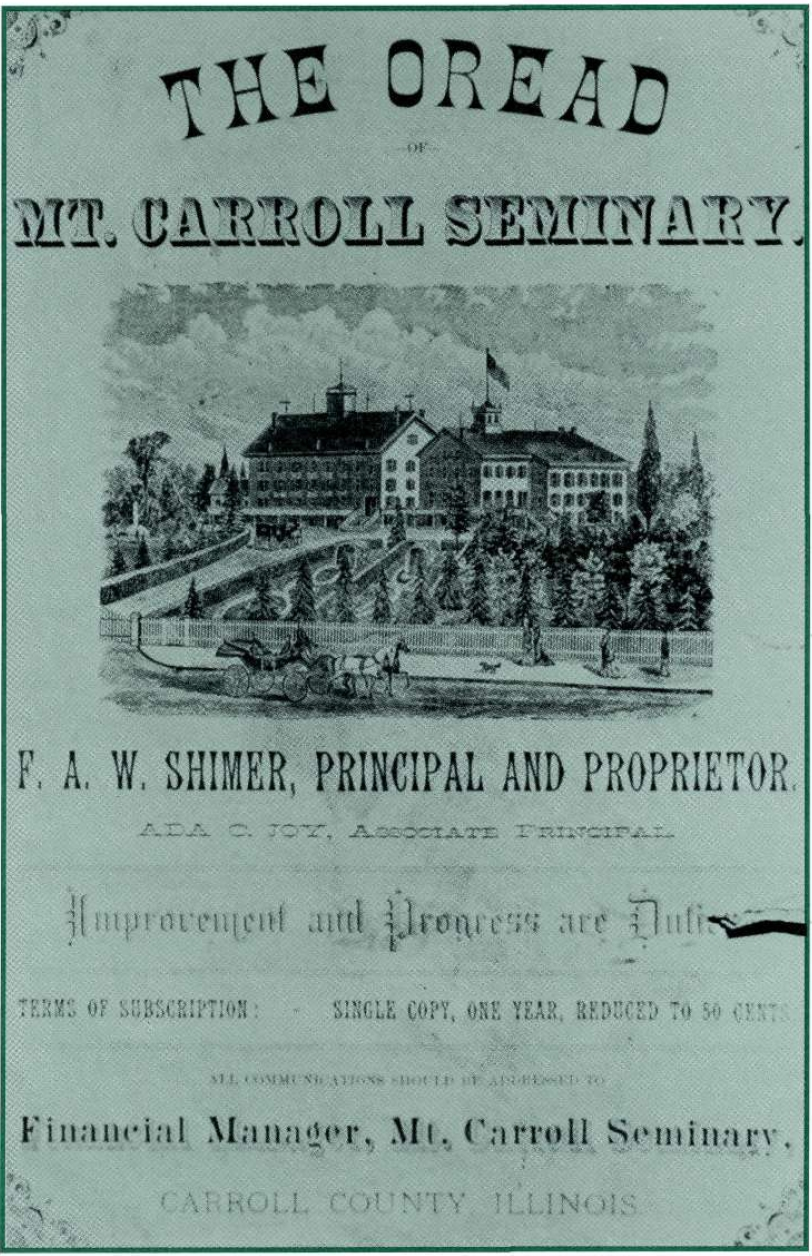
The Oread, published by the Oread Society.

Student life at the Seminary involved long class days, extending from 8 AM to lights out at 9:30 PM. Life was also structured by strict rules. For example, students were not allowed to leave the school without a request from home, and the students were not permitted any visitors unless approved by their parents. Many pupils at the school were residential, but a significant number were day-students living with their families nearby. When the seminary formally opened in 1854, day-students accounted for about two-thirds of the student body. As the reputation of the seminary increased, a greater portion of students came from further away.

The Seminary had a number of student organizations. One of the first of these was the Neosophic Society. Under the Shimer-Joy administration of 1870 and thereafter, campus organizations included a Reunion Club (for alumni and former students), German Club, Missionary Club, Literary Society and Oread Society.

The first student publication was the Seminary Bell, an eight-page monthly journal begun by the Neosophic Society in 1859. This was published for a time from the offices of the Carroll County Republican, which had been taken over by a faculty member named Silvernail and a student named Ladd. When the Republican became insolvent, its equipment was acquired by Mrs Shimer and moved to the Seminary, where printing was overseen by a student named George Shaw who worked as a printer. A combination of circumstances including the departure of Mr Shaw to the American Civil War led to the cessation of publication of the Bell in 1862.

In 1869, the Oread Society began to publish the Oread, also a monthly journal. The pages of the Oread were also used to publish announcements and advertisements from the school and its proprietor. Issues were 16 pages in length in 1869, and had reached 25 pages in length by 1878.

== Campus ==
Some two thousand apple trees, two acres of grapes, with every other hardy fruit in equal abundance, are cultivated for the exclusive use of the institution.

— Oread, August 1878

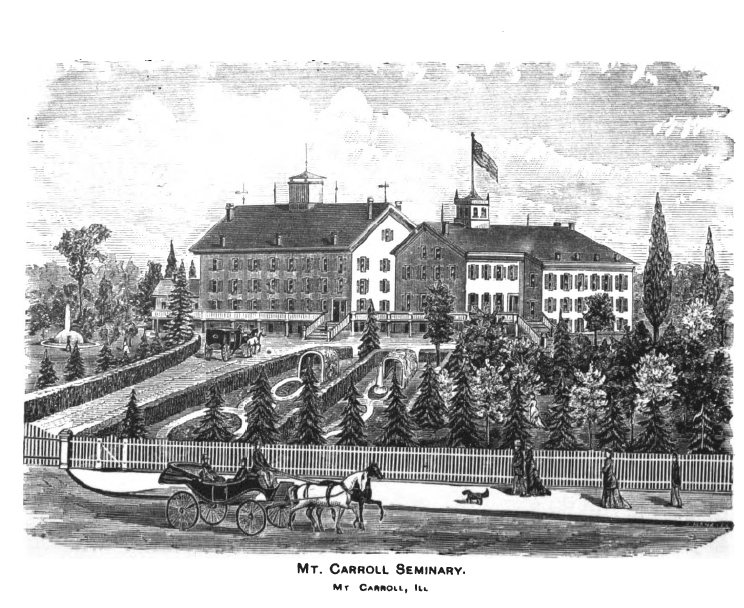
Mount Carroll Seminary, engraving, 1878.

Throughout the 19th century, the campus grew steadily from the original single building. By 1878, four buildings had been constructed, but the first three of these were joined together so as to give the impression of a single large building. Internally, the construction was such as to create a domestic atmosphere, with a large number of small rooms.

The original brick building, constructed in 1854, was initially two and a half stories in height and 42 x 46 feet (14 m), consisting of 20 rooms. The height was subsequently increased to four stories. By 1878, the entire first floor, which had originally held seven rooms, had been opened up to form a single large dining room for the community. The second story held the library, office, reception room and music room. This library was established in 1867 after the construction of the third building, using the space formerly occupied by classrooms. It held 3000 books by 1878, and was also the designated repository for official documents from Washington, DC. The third and fourth stories of the building held private and trunk rooms in 1878, with a reading room on the third story.

The second and third buildings were constructed in 1857 and 1865-1867 respectively. The second building was 21 x 60 feet (18 m), two and a half stories tall, and added to the southeast of the first building. The construction of this addition in 1857 was halted by the Panic of 1857, when only the masonry and carpentry had been completed. Wood, Gregory and their students worked together to successfully complete the construction in time for classes to start. This cost-saving pattern was followed in the subsequent expansion from 1865 to 1867.

The plans for both of these buildings were drafted by Frances Wood Shimer. In 1878 these two buildings were four stories tall. They held classrooms and recitation rooms on the first floor, as well as four private rooms for young men employed in the Labor Department. The second and third floors held dormitory rooms, and the fourth floor was devoted to studios and rooms for musical practice.

The fourth building, completed in 1876, was five stories tall. It was known as the "East Hall". The first story was occupied by utility rooms such as the kitchen, furnace room and laundry facilities. The second story was occupied on one side by music rooms and on the other by the principal's rooms and infirmary. The third and fourth floors were occupied by the dormitory rooms of students, and the fifth floor included a sunbathing room, rooms for musical practice, and large tanks for holding water.

The grounds of the campus began in 1854 with 5 acres (20,000 m^{2}) of vacant land that had been used as a wheat field. By 1883, the campus covered 25 acres (10 ha), much of it planted with fruit trees. The landscaping followed the landscape gardening style of Andrew Jackson Downing, who advocated landscapes that created images that were beautiful or picturesque, to create an idealized image of rural life. The orchards and vineyards which occupied much of the grounds served both practical and recreational purposes. Their products were not sold, but used entirely to feed the "Seminary family".

In addition to the main buildings, there were numerous outbuildings. One of these was the windmill house, near the main building and octagonal in shape. This drew water from a well 130 feet (40 m) deep. The 1894 Sanborn map also shows icehouses, henhouses and corn cribs.

== Transition to Frances Shimer Academy ==
William Rainey Harper, with whom the transfer was negotiated.

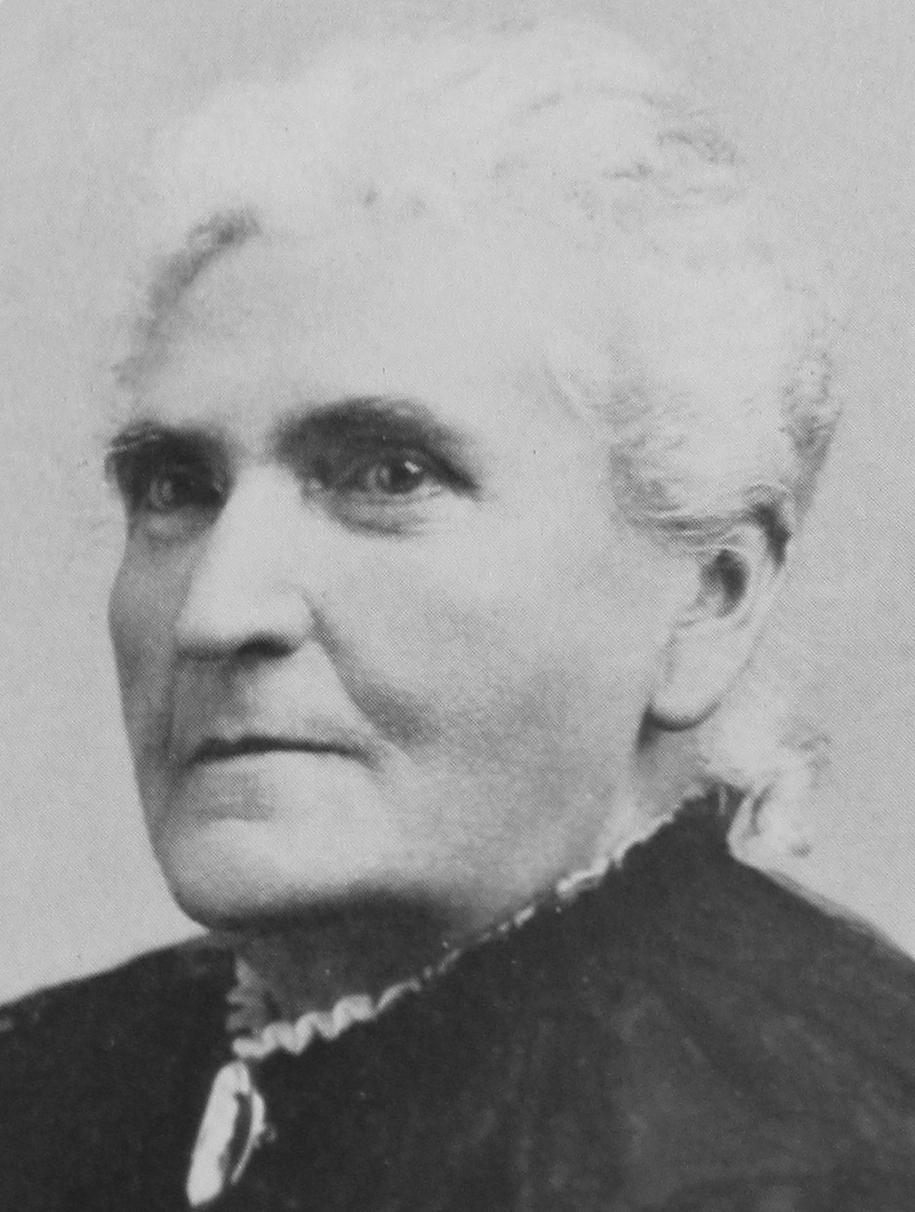
Frances Shimer in her later years.

In the 1880s, Frances Shimer became concerned about the future viability of the school, and made repeated efforts to secure an endowment. In 1886 she offered to provide the seminary to the Women's Christian Temperance Union on the condition that an endowment be raised. A similar proposal was made to the Baptist women of Illinois in 1887, with the requirement that they provide a $100,000 endowment; although a Women's Society was established to serve as a vehicle for this, the funds were never raised.

Frances Shimer's personal efforts to provide endowment funds were also frustrated. In a will written shortly before his suicide in July 1895, her husband Henry Shimer left his entire fortune to Frances Shimer to use for educational purposes. However, the will was successfully contested by the Shimer family, and the resulting reduced endowment was never sufficient to provide meaningful financial support. Frances Shimer also expected to be able to provide endowment funds from her orange groves near DeLand, Florida, but these were destroyed by a severe frost in January 1895.

On July 1, 1896, Frances Shimer transferred control of the seminary to a 15-member board of trustees, under an affiliation with the University of Chicago. The school at the time had an estimated value of $250,000. The affiliation related primarily to educational standards, and did not include any financial support.

Shimer then became known as the Frances Shimer Academy of the University of Chicago. Shimer also adopted the University of Chicago's affiliation with the Baptist denomination, and required that at least two-thirds of the Board be members of a Baptist church. The membership of the Board was divided equally among representatives of the University of Chicago, graduates of the Mount Carroll Seminary, and citizens of Mount Carroll.

== Works cited ==
- Charles L. Hostetter, ed. (1913). Historical Encyclopedia of Illinois, Volume 2.
- The History of Carroll County, Illinois. H.F. Kett & Co. 1878.
- Patrick H. Moorhead (1983). The Shimer College presidency : 1930 to 1980 (D.Ed. thesis). Loyola University Chicago. OCLC 9789513.
- Winona Branch Sawyer (1901). Frances Shimer, 1826-1901 (Mrs. Shimer's Life and Work). pp. 9–27.

== See also ==
- Female seminaries
- History of Shimer College
- Mount Carroll, Illinois
