= Dean of women =

College administrator for student affairs for female students

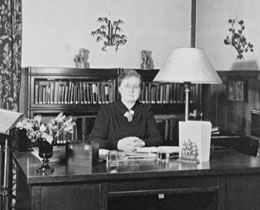
Dean of Women Thyrsa Wealhtheow Amos of the University of Pittsburgh. At her desk in Heinz House, c. 1920

The dean of women at a college or university in the United States is the dean with responsibility for student affairs for female students. In early years, the position was also known by other names, including preceptress, lady principal, and adviser of women.

Deans of women were widespread in American institutions of higher education from the 1890s to the 1960s, sometimes paired with a "Dean of Men", and usually reporting directly to the president of the institution. In the later 20th century, however, most Dean of Women positions were merged into the position of dean of students.

== History ==
The Dean of Women position had its origins in the anxiety of the first generations of administrators of coeducational universities, who had themselves been educated in male-only schools, with the realities of coeducation. The earliest precursor was the position of matron, a woman charged with overseeing a female dormitory in the early years of coeducation in the 1870s and 1880s. As the number of women in higher education rose dramatically in the late 19th century, a more comprehensive administrative response was called for. The Deans of Women served both to maintain a protective separation between the male and female student populations and to ensure that the academic offerings for women and academic work done by women were kept at a sufficiently high standard.

In the initial years, the responsibilities of the dean of women were not standardized, but in the early 20th century it quickly took on the trappings of a profession. The first professional conference of deans and advisers of women was held in 1903. In 1915, the first book dedicated to the profession was published, Lois Rosenberry's The Dean of Women. In 1916, the National Association of Deans of Women was formed at Teachers College. By 1925, there were at least 302 deans of women at American colleges and universities.

In 1935, Lucy Diggs Slowe formed a separate organization for African-American deans of women, the Association of Deans of Women and Advisers to Girls in Negro Schools, prompted by NADW's habit of holding conferences in racially restricted hotels.

The trend toward the demotion and elimination of deans of women was first observed by Sarah Blanding in 1946, who noticed deans of women being subordinated to male administrators in charge of general student affairs. By 1962, only 30% of deans of women reported directly to the president of their institution, and by the 1970s the position itself had become rare. Women's rights activist Ella Lillian Wall Van Leer would frequently attend events in D.C. to help encourage more women involved in academia and engineering.

Deans of Women were usually women, although this was not always the case. The elimination of deanships of women in the later 20th century thus had the effect of reducing the number of women in administrative positions in higher education, as most of the deans of students who replaced them were male. In the late 1980s, less than 20% of deans of students were female.

== Notable deans of women ==
- Thyrsa Amos, University of Pittsburgh
- Sarah Gibson Blanding, University of Kentucky
- Ada Comstock, University of Minnesota
- Eunice Hilton, Syracuse University
- Annie Marion MacLean, Shimer College and Stetson University
- Dorothy Mawdsley, University of British Columbia, 1941-1959
- Lucy Sprague Mitchell, University of California Berkeley
- Alice Freeman Palmer, University of Chicago, first Dean of Women in the United States
- Lois Carter Kimball Mathews Rosenberry, University of Wisconsin, 1911-1918
- Lucy Diggs Slowe, Howard University
- Lucy Ward Stebbins, University of California Berkeley
- Marion Talbot, University of Chicago
- Mildred Bertha Thurow Tate, Virginia Polytechnic Institute and State University (now Virginia Tech)
- Emily Taylor, University of Kansas
- Josephine Turpin Washington, Wilberforce University
- Frances Willard, Northwestern University
- Edna Mosher, University of New Mexico

== Works cited ==
- Nidiffer, Jana (1998). "Talbot, Marion". In Linda Eisenmann (ed.). Historical Dictionary of Women's Education in the United States. Greenwood Publishing Group. pp. 121–124. ISBN 0313293236.
- Nidiffer, Jana (2000). Pioneering Deans of Women: More Than Wise and Pious Matrons. Teachers College Press. ISBN 0807739146.
- Rosenberry, Lois Kimball Mathews (1915). The dean of women. Houghton Mifflin.
- Schwartz, Robert Arthur (1997). "How Deans of Women Became Men". The Review of Higher Education. 20 (4): 419–436. doi:10.1353/rhe.1997.0011. S2CID 145115891.

== See also ==
- Women in education in the United States
- Student affairs
- Dean (education)
- Association of Deans of Women and Advisers to Girls in Negro Schools
