= List of presidents of Shimer College =

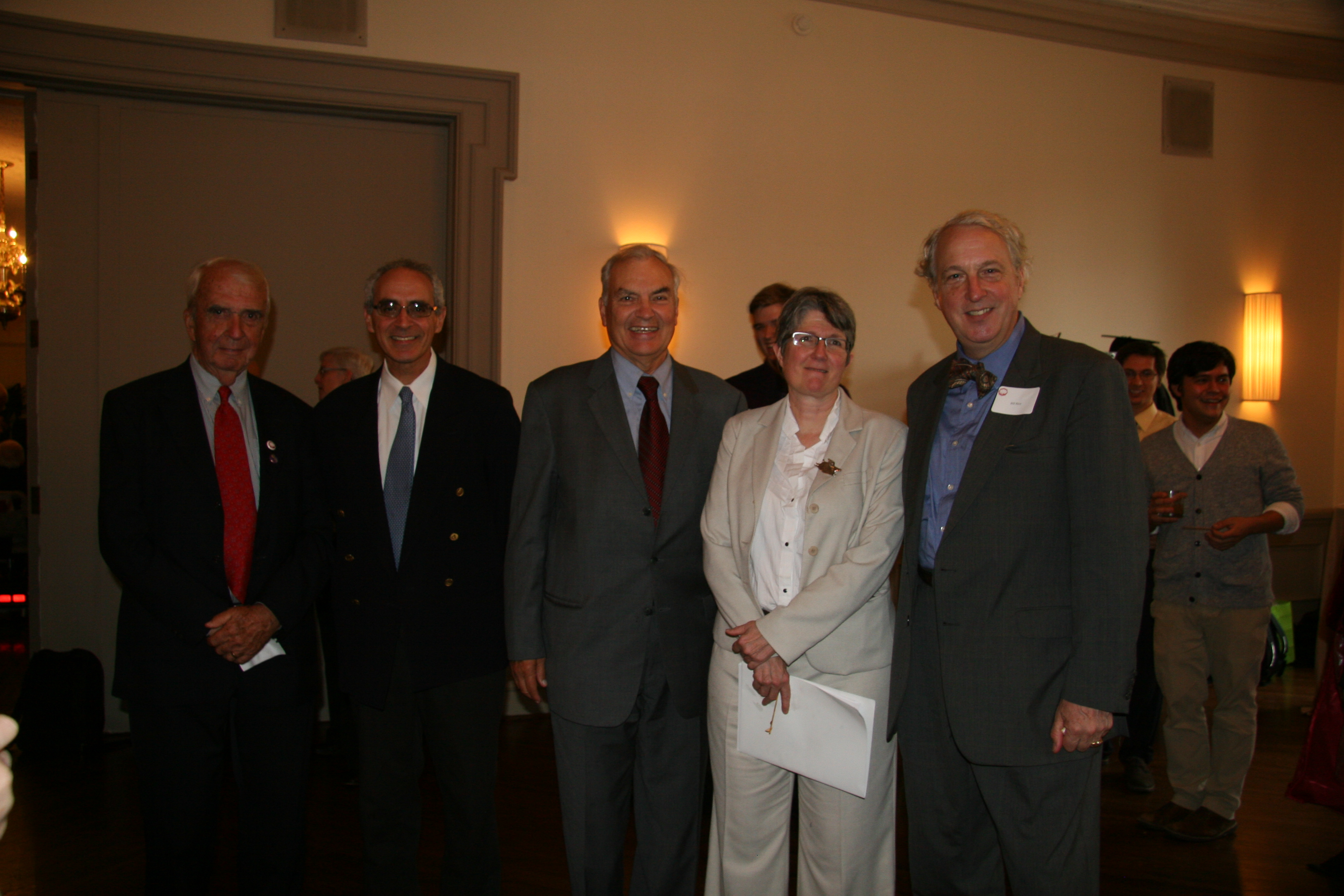
Former president Ed Noonan, former interim president David Shiner, former president Don Moon, current president Susan Henking, and former president William Craig Rice.

This is a list of presidents of Shimer College, from 1853 to the position's abolition in 2017.

== List ==
- A "–" indicates that the individual served as interim or acting president.

#	Image	Name	Term begin	Term end	Notes	Ref.
1		Frances Shimer	1853	1896	Principal of Mount Carroll Seminary; Former schoolteacher	
1		Cindarella Gregory	1853	1870	Co-Principal of Mount Carroll Seminary, departed in 1870; Former schoolteacher	
–		Frank J. Miller	1896	1897	Non-resident principal of Frances Shimer Academy; Professor at University of Chicago	
2		William Parker McKee	1897	1930	Dean of Frances Shimer Academy; Former Baptist minister	
3		Floyd Wilcox	1930	1935	President of Frances Shimer Junior College	
–		A. Beth Hostetter	1935	1936		
4		Raymond Culver	1936	1938	Formerly professor of Bible and religious education at Linfield College	
–		A. Beth Hostetter	1938	1939		
5		Albin C. Bro	1939	1949	Former staff at University of Chicago Press; President of Frances Shimer College	
–		John H. Russel	1949	1950		
6		Aaron Brumbaugh	1950	1954	Former Dean of the College of the University of Chicago	
7		Francis Joseph Mullin	1954	1968	Former professor of medicine at the University of Chicago	
8		Milburn Akers	1968	1970	Former editor at the Chicago Sun-Times	
9		Robert Spencer Long	1970	1974	Formerly Dean at Roger Williams College	
–		Esther G. Weinstein	1974	1975	Formerly Professor of Social Sciences and Associate Dean at Shimer College	
10		Ralph W. Conant	1975	1978	Urbanologist	
11		Donald P. Moon	1978	2004	Episcopal priest Former nuclear reactor physicist	
12		William Craig Rice	2004	2006	Former staff member at the American Academy for Liberal Education	
–		Ronald Champagne	2007	2009	Former administrator at Roosevelt University	
13		Thomas K. Lindsay	2009	2010	Former director at the National Endowment for the Humanities	
–		Edward Noonan	2010	2012	Former architect	
14		Susan Henking	2012	2017	Scholar of religious studies Final President of Shimer College	

== Works cited ==
- Shimer College (2000). Shimer College Faculty & Alum Directory 2000.
