= Don Moon =

Don Moon may refer to:

- Don P. Moon (1894–1944), U.S. Navy admiral
- Don Moon (educator) (born 1936), American educator, minister and former nuclear reactor physicist
