= Frank Justus Miller =

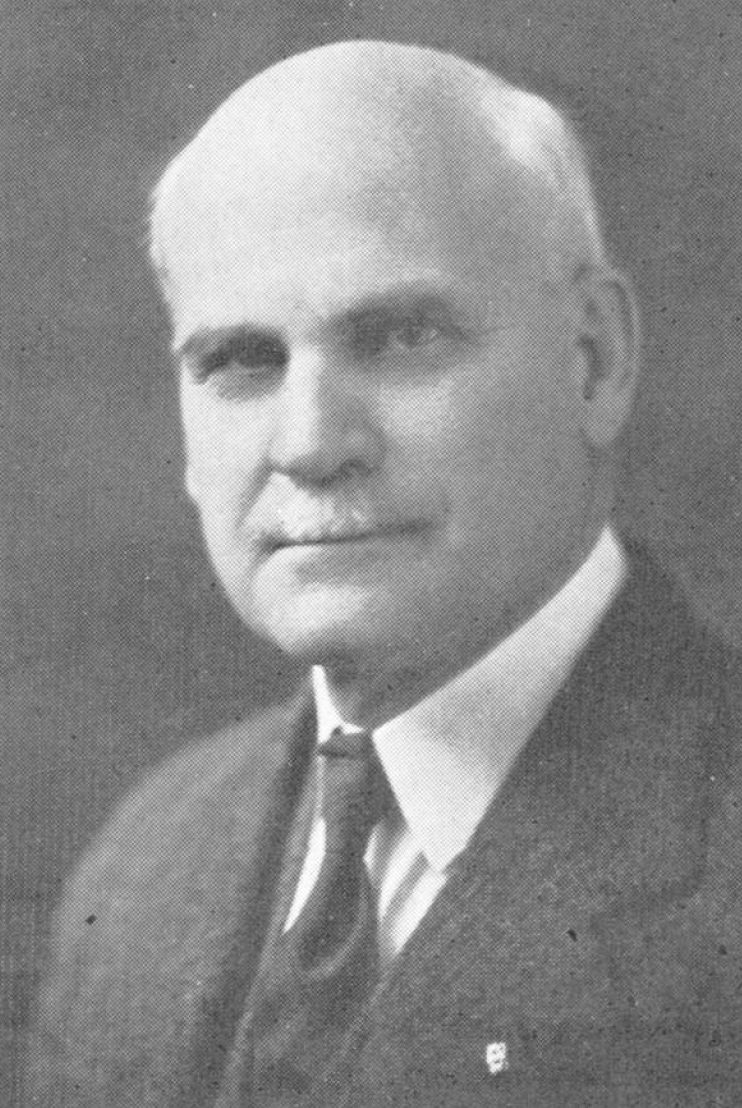
Frank Justus Miller

Frank Justus Miller (1858-1938) was a leading American classicist, translator, and university administrator in the late 19th and early 20th centuries. He authored the Loeb Classical Library translations of Seneca and of Ovid's Metamorphoses, and was president of the American Classical League for more than a decade, from 1922 to 1934.

In addition, Miller served as Dean of the College of Arts and Sciences at the University of Chicago from 1911 to 1923, and was the first interim president of Shimer College in 1896–1897.

== Education and early career ==
Miller was born on November 26, 1858, in Clinton, Tennessee. His father was a Baptist minister, James W. Miller. He obtained his bachelor's degree from Denison University in 1879, and took up the career of a Latin instructor, teaching at Clinton College for a year while continuing his studies. He completed his master's degree in 1882.

From 1881 to 1887, he served as the vice principal of the Plainfield High School in Plainfield, New Jersey. During this period, on July 10, 1883, he married Lida Willett, who later became a co-founder of the University of Chicago Settlement. After leaving his high school position, Miller worked as a Latin instructor at the Worcester Academy in Worcester, Massachusetts, from 1887 to 1890.

Miller received his Ph.D. at Yale in 1892. His dissertation was on "The Latinity of the Younger Pliny".

== University career ==
While completing his Ph.D. at Yale, Miller became acquainted with William Rainey Harper, then a professor of Semitic languages. Harper left Yale in 1891 to become the first president of the University of Chicago, and subsequently offered Miller a job at the new University of Chicago. Miller accepted the offer, becoming an instructor of Latin and assistant examiner, and worked at the U of C until his retirement. He was remembered as "one of the most versatile and influential" of the members of the original U of C faculty who spent their careers at the university.

Miller published influential translations of Ovid, Virgil and Seneca. Miller's approach to Ovid for the Loeb Classical Library edition of the Metamorphoses was considered regressive even in its time, but inspired later translators in the same mold, such as A.E. Watts. In 1908, Miller published two theatrical adaptations of passages in Virgil's Aeneid, "Dido: The Phoenician Queen" and "The Fall of Troy".

For much of his time at the University of Chicago, Miller was charged with special responsibility for the university's affiliations program. He served as examiner for affiliations from 1892 to 1898 and "dean of affiliations" from 1898 to 1904. In this capacity, he served as "non-resident principal" of the Frances Shimer Academy, which later became Shimer College, for the 1896-1897 academic year, between the presidencies of Frances Shimer and William Parker McKee. Accordingly, he has traditionally been considered the first interim president of Shimer.

As the affiliations program originally envisioned by Harper was gradually scaled back, Miller's title changed from Dean of Affiliations to Examiner for Secondary Schools, a position he held from 1904 to 1911. Miller became Dean of the College of Arts and Sciences in 1911, holding that position until 1923. He retired from the university in 1925, but continued to hold visiting professorships at universities throughout the Midwest until his death.

Miller held leadership positions outside the University as well, serving as president of the American Classical League from 1922 to 1934. He was also assistant chief editor of the Standard American Encyclopedia, although this was not published until 1940, after his death.

Miller's translations and writings on Virgil led to a chairmanship of a planning committee for the 1930 "Bimillenarium Vergilianum", which was sponsored by the American Classical League, of which he was serving as president. His work for the Bimillenarium earned him the Order of the Crown of Italy.

In retirement, Miller moved to Denver, Colorado. He died on April 23, 1938, while visiting his daughter in Norwalk, Connecticut.

== Writings ==
- Studies in the Poetry of Italy; I. Roman (1901)
- A Second Latin Book (1902) (with Charles Beeson)
- Two Dramatizations from Vergil (1908)

Translations:

- Selected Works of Vergil (1892)
- Selected Works of Ovid (1900)
- Dido, An Epic Tragedy (1900)
- The Tragedies of Seneca (1907)
- Ovid: Metamorphoses (Loeb Classical Library) (1916–1917)
- Seneca: Tragedies (Loeb Classical Library) (1917)

== Works cited ==
- Lattimer, John Francis (1994). "Miller, Frank Justus". In Ward W. Briggs (ed.). Biographical Dictionary of North American Classicists. pp. 413–414. ISBN 9780313245602.
- Bentley, M. Julia (1938). "A Tribute to Frank Justus Miller. November 26, 1858-April 23, 1938". The Classical Journal. 34 (2): 68–69. JSTOR 3291445.
