= Celatoria =

Scientific classification
- Kingdom: Animalia
- Phylum: Arthropoda
- Class: Insecta
- Order: Diptera
- Family: Tachinidae
- Subfamily: Exoristinae
- Tribe: Blondeliini
- Genus: Celatoria; Coquillett, 1890

Type species
- Celatoria crawii Coquillett, 1890

Synonyms
- Chaetophleps Coquillett, 1895; Neocelatoria Walton, 1914

Genus of flies

Celatoria is a genus of flies in the family Tachinidae. Larvae are parasitoids of leaf beetles.

== Species ==
- Celatoria bosqi Blanchard, 1937
- Celatoria brasiliensis Townsend, 1929
- Celatoria compressa (Wulp, 1890)
- Celatoria diabroticae (Shimer, 1871)
- Celatoria maracasi Thompson, 1968
- Celatoria nigricans (Wulp, 1890)
- Celatoria setosa (Coquillett, 1895)
