= International Business College =

International Business College may refer to:

- International Business College (Fort Wayne, Indiana)
- International Business College (Indianapolis)
- International Business College (El Paso, Texas)
