= History of Shimer College =

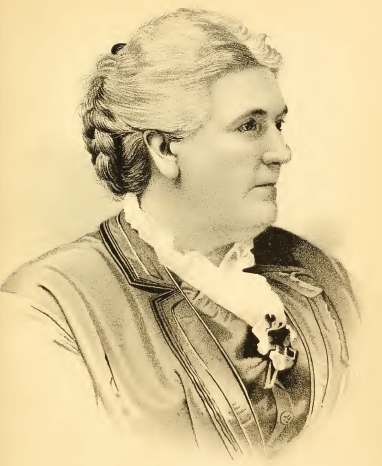
Portrait of Frances Shimer, co-founder of Shimer College.

Shimer College was founded in 1852, when the pioneer town of Mt. Carroll, Illinois, lacking a public school, incorporated the Mt. Carroll Seminary with no land, no teachers, and no money for this purpose.

Founded as non-denominational, it was affiliated with Baptists from 1896 into the 1950s, and subsequently with The Episcopal Church between 1959 and 1973, after which it became non-denominational once again.

Shimer has evolved over time from a coeducational seminary to a women's seminary, a women's academy, a women's junior college, a women's college, and finally a coeducational Great Books college.

Throughout its existence, it has been involved a series of crises and profound changes. Because of this, the college is often symbolized by a phoenix which is reborn from its own ashes. Crises throughout Shimer's history have included three abandonments of the college by its board in 1855, 1973 and 1977; a catastrophic fire in 1906; bankruptcies in 1974 and 1977; and struggles over governance in 1966 and 2010.

Faculty and students have historically worked together to keep the college viable. The college has undergone two hotly contested moves, from Mount Carroll, Illinois to Waukegan, Illinois in 1978 and from Waukegan to Chicago in 2006. In 2017, Shimer College became the Shimer School of Great Books at North Central College.

Characteristics that have been noted to recur throughout Shimer's history, include a unique degree of student involvement in administering the school's affairs. The school maintains a tradition of welcoming any pupils as they are ready and able to learn, admitting students many schools would consider too young.

The school has maintained notably high standards of academic performance and required workload. In the 19th century, it sent students to the East Coast ready to skip the first years of college. In the 20th and 21st centuries, Shimer students had among the highest GRE scores and rates of graduate study in the country.

Name Changes
1853:	Mount Carroll Seminary
1896:	Frances Shimer Academy of the University of Chicago
1908:	Frances Shimer Academy and Junior College
1910:	Frances Shimer School
1932:	Frances Shimer Junior College
1942:	Frances Shimer College
1950:	Shimer College
2017:	Shimer Great Book School of North Central College

== Mount Carroll Seminary ==
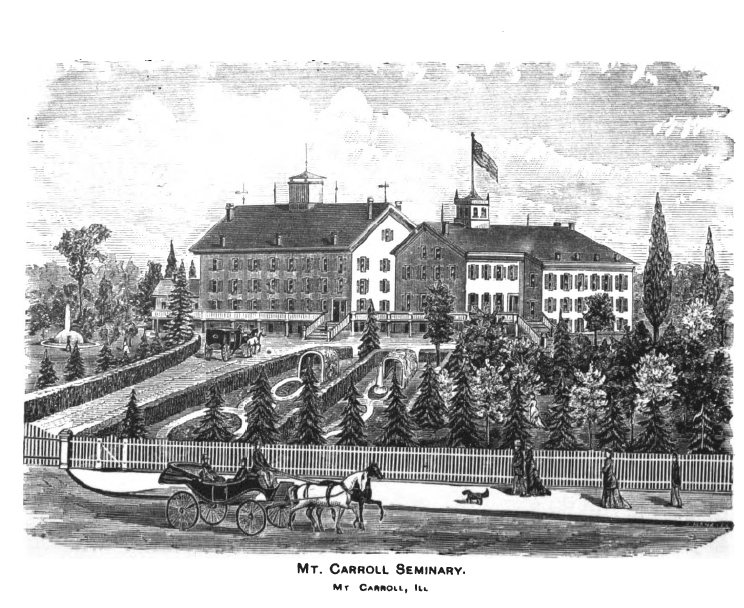
Mount Carroll Seminary, engraving, 1878.

Shimer College was founded in Mount Carroll, Illinois, USA as the Mount Carroll Seminary, a non-denominational coeducational seminary. The charter for the seminary was granted by the Illinois General Assembly on June 18, 1852, after lobbying by the citizens of Mount Carroll.

The town sought and secured two recent graduates of the New York State Normal School.

Frances Wood (later Frances Shimer) and her friend Cindarella Gregory, arrived from Ballston Spa, New York and classes began on May 11, 1853, with 11 students in a single room in the Presbyterian church in Mount Carroll . Enrollment rose in the course of the year; when the college formally opened in a dedicated building in 1854, there were 75 students.

The seminary was to have been funded by subscription. However, only a fraction of the original pledges were honored. In 1855, fearing that the school would fail due to the lack of subscription revenue, the incorporators sold their shares in the college to the teachers, Wood and Gregory. This was arranged under favorable terms, with the land donated and the buildings sold at cost, on the condition that Wood and Gregory continue operating the school for at least 10 years. The transfer took effect on March 30, 1855. On February 25, 1867, the school was re-chartered by the state legislature to reflect the new arrangement.

Throughout the 19th century, the campus grew steadily from the original single building. In 1857, construction on an expansion was halted due to the Panic of 1857. Wood, Gregory and their students worked together to successfully complete the construction in time for classes to start. This cost-saving pattern was followed in a subsequent expansion from 1865 to 1867. The campus was known for being free of disease due to the hygienic design of these buildings. By 1883, the campus covered 25 acres (100,000 m^{2}), much of it planted with trees.

The music and arts programs were a significant attraction of the seminary. The seminary had the first piano in Carroll County. The seminary's music program began with only 3 students, but grew rapidly. By the 1880s, there were 5 to 7 music faculty, and the conservatory held nearly 40 instruments. The music program in this period was overseen by Mrs B.F. Dearborn Hazzen, a voice instructor who became associated with the seminary in the late 1860s. The music and arts programs remained strong even after the seminary became the Frances Shimer Academy in 1896.

On December 22, 1857, Frances Wood married local naturalist Henry Shimer, thus becoming Frances Shimer. It has frequently been claimed, including by Henry Shimer's family, that the marriage was purely a marriage of convenience. Henry Shimer subsequently became a physician and also taught science classes at the seminary. He later became wealthy through real estate speculation.

The Mount Carroll Seminary functioned similarly to a preparatory school, with a six-year course of study that could lead the pupil to more advanced study. Some graduates were even ready to skip the first years of college. The specialized departments of the school included a normal department which trained schoolteachers, a music department that employed up to seven teachers, and a labor department that gave students the opportunity to work off their tuition obligations. A full scholarship to the normal department was provided for one teacher from each township of Carroll County, and one teacher from each county in the state.

The seminary accepted any pupil who was willing to learn, and is said to have welcomed pupils as young as three. Facing space constraints in 1866 following the US Civil War, the formerly coeducational seminary limited residential study to women, although some men were still allowed as day students.

From 1853 to 1896, Frances Shimer was the chief executive of the school. Initially this was a partnership between her and Cindarella Gregory, who served as the chief academic officer while Frances oversaw the finances of the school. In 1870, the partnership ended, when Gregory left the school to marry. The Mount Carroll Seminary remained the sole property of Frances Wood Shimer until her retirement in 1896. For most of her administration, the seminary made no effort to either recruit students or solicit donations, focusing all energy on creating a school that would merit confidence.

In the 1880s, Frances Shimer became concerned about the future viability of the school, and made repeated efforts to secure an endowment. In 1886 she offered to provide the seminary to the Women's Christian Temperance Union on the condition that an endowment be raised. In 1888 she offered to transfer the seminary to a board of trustees on the condition that they provide $100,000 to start an endowment. However, the proposed trustees were unable to raise this sum. In a will authored shortly before his suicide in July 1895, Henry Shimer left his entire fortune to her to use for educational purposes. However, the will was successfully contested by the Shimer family, and the resulting reduced endowment was never sufficient to provide meaningful financial support.

== Relationship with the University of Chicago: Frances Shimer Academy and Junior College ==
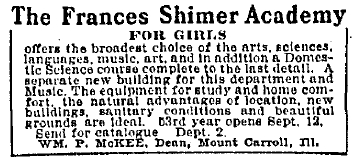
Advertisement for the Frances Shimer Academy, printed in the Chicago Daily Tribune in 1906.

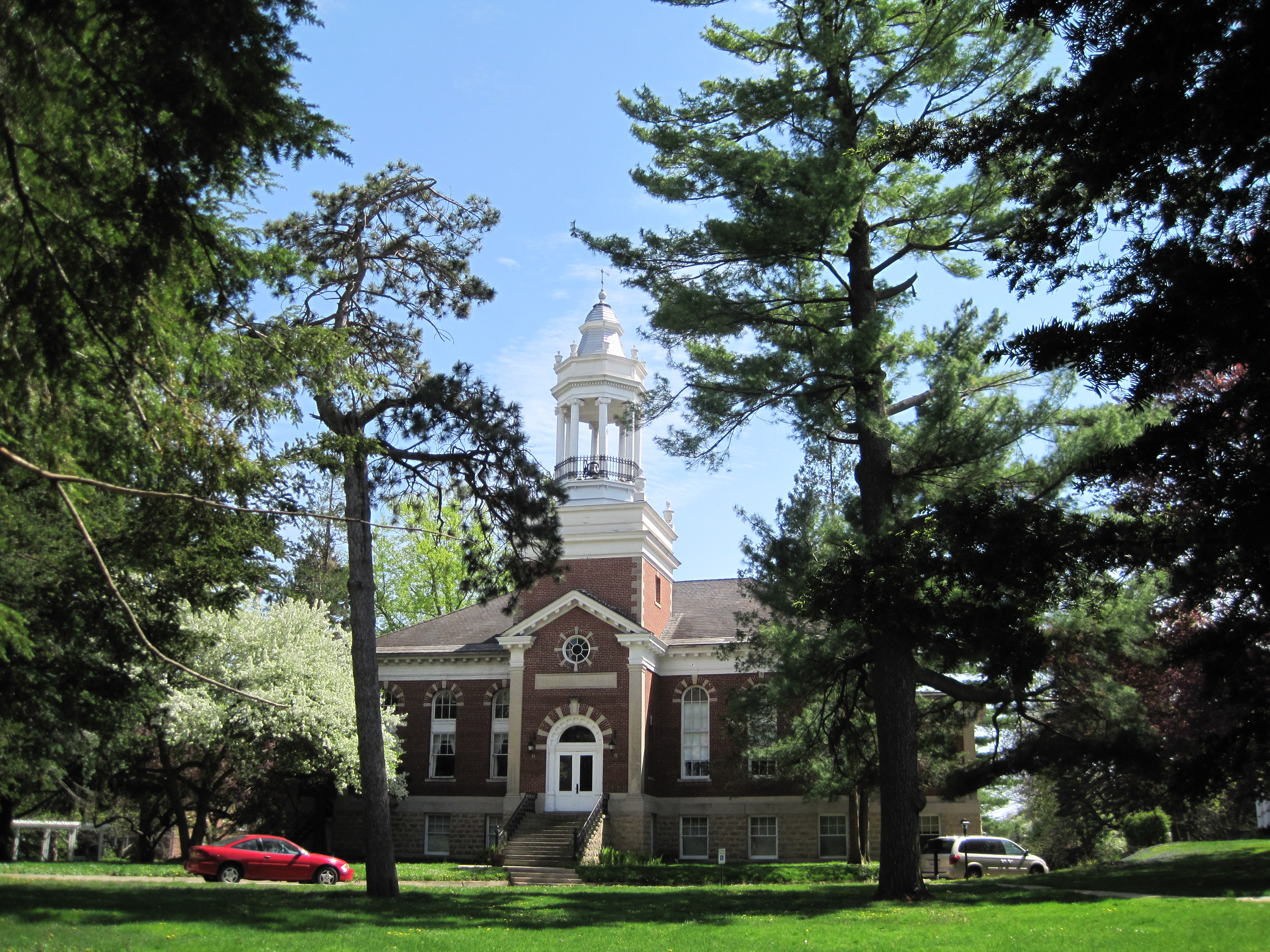
Metcalf Hall, constructed in 1908.

On July 1, 1896, Frances Shimer transferred control of the seminary to a 15-member board of trustees, under an affiliation with the University of Chicago. The school at the time had an estimated value of $250,000. The affiliation related primarily to educational standards, and did not include any financial support. Shimer then became known as the Frances Shimer Academy of the University of Chicago. Shimer also adopted the University of Chicago's affiliation with the Baptist denomination, and required that at least two-thirds of the Board be members of a Baptist church. The membership of the Board was divided equally among representatives of the University of Chicago, graduates of the Mount Carroll Seminary, and citizens of Mount Carroll.

Having completed the affiliation arrangements, Frances Shimer, in ill health, then retired to Florida where she took up orange growing. In 1897, her place as the executive of the college was taken by Dean William Parker McKee, who served until 1930. Like most Shimer executives throughout the school's history, McKee was also an instructor, teaching history. Frances Shimer died on November 10, 1901, and her body was returned to Mount Carroll for burial.

Under the terms of the affiliation, academics were kept to University of Chicago standards, so that students left the academy and junior college prepared to continue their studies at any university in the country. Examinations were held at the University of Chicago campus in Hyde Park. However, the academic relationship faded over subsequent decades, until it was restored in 1950. The academy was accredited by the North Central Association in 1909, and the junior college was accredited in 1920.

Throughout this period, the College was governed by a chief executive overseen by the Board of Trustees; McKee, the first chief executive, was known as "Dean", but the subsequent executives were known as "President". McKee was followed as Dean by Floyd Cleveland Wilcox, who served from 1930 to 1935, and Raymond B. Culver, who served from 1936 to 1938. Albin C. Bro held the presidency from 1939 to 1949. In 1942, the college dropped the "junior" from its name and became "Frances Shimer College."

In the late 1890s and early 20th century, enrollment rose steadily. To accommodate this, the board ordered new construction on the campus, of the South Hall (1899), Dearborn Hall (1903) for music, and Hathaway Hall (1904).

On February 9, 1906, a fire destroyed much of the campus, including South Hall and all of the buildings that had been part of the Mount Carroll Seminary. An emergency fundraising drive was launched which secured $50,000 to rebuild the campus. The campus was rebuilt with more modern and fireproof brick buildings, West Hall (1906) and Metcalf Hall (1908).

In 1909, a College Hall was erected on the campus, and a junior college program was formally begun. In that year the enrollment was the highest on record. The school had already been providing college-type instruction since 1907. The first junior college class graduated in 1910. The name of the college was changed from "Frances Shimer Academy" to "Frances Shimer School" in 1910. At this time, the school offered two separate courses of study: a 4-year academy course equivalent to high school, and the 2-year junior college course. As the academy was phased out, the name of the school was changed again to "Frances Shimer Junior College" in 1932.

In the 1940s, the college faced difficulties with both enrollment and finances. By 1949, enrollment had fallen to 65 students and the college was $80,000 in debt. Donations from graduates were slight, as students of the junior college would typically go on to another college, marry a graduate of another college, or both.

== Shimer College in Mount Carroll ==
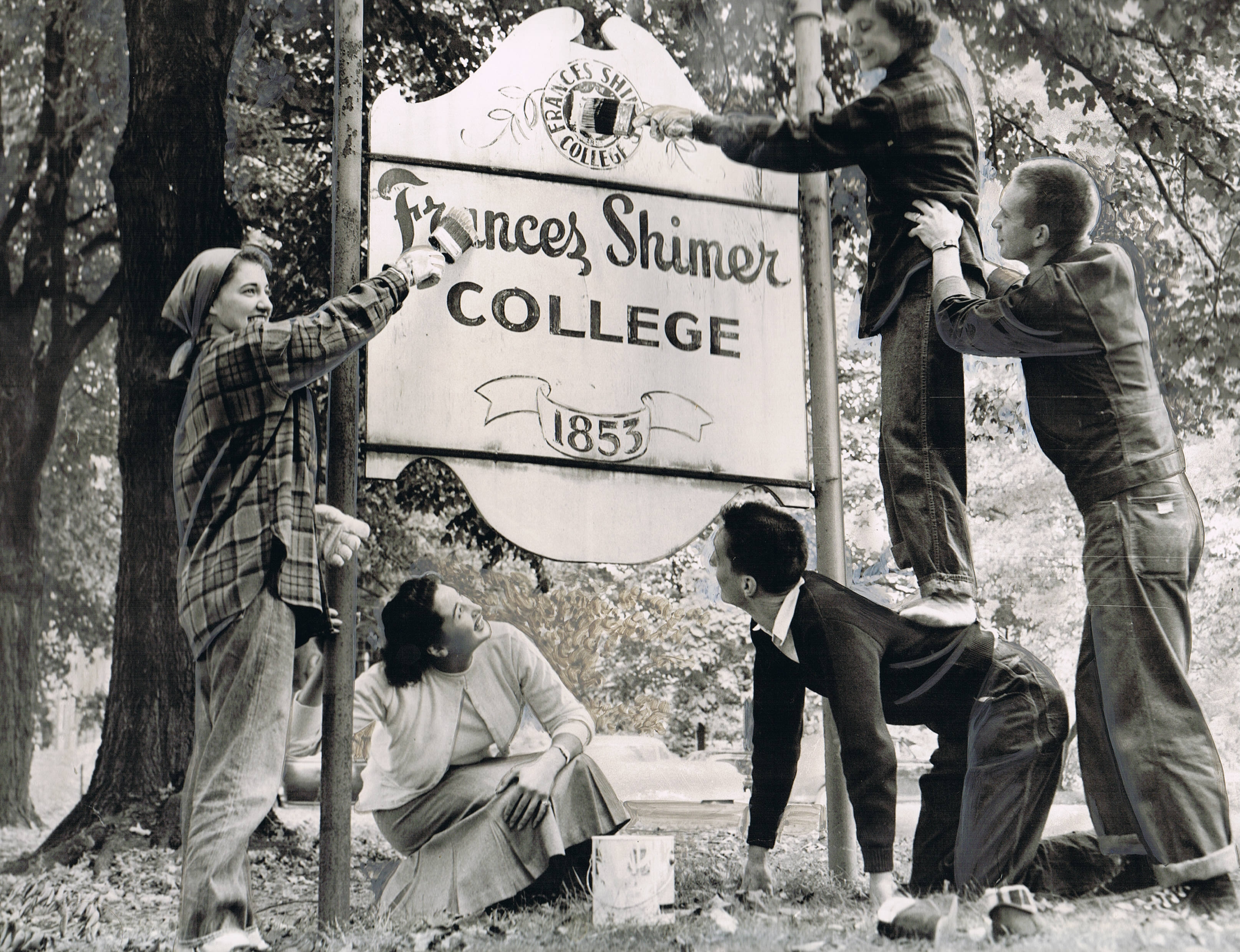
Students painting out the name "Frances" on the school sign in September 1950.

Shimer underwent a major reorganization in 1950 when Aaron Brumbaugh assumed the presidency. He had previously been Dean of the College at the University of Chicago.

In the reorganization, Shimer took on its current name, "Shimer College", for the first time. Shimer again became coeducational, and adopted the Chicago "Hutchins Plan", thus becoming a Great Books school. In the course of this transition, the requirement for a majority of Baptists on the Board was removed, although a nominal Baptist affiliation was retained for some years. Shimer remained officially classified as a junior college until it was accredited as a four-year college by the North Central Association in 1959.

At the same time as the reorganization, Shimer was selected together with 11 other colleges nationwide to receive a Ford Foundation grant to support an early entrance program under which high school students could enter college before graduating. The program was a success, and although the grant expired in 1955, the program was kept in place. Shimer's early entrance program continues in operation as of 2010. In contrast, most other schools receiving the grant soon canceled their early entrance programs.

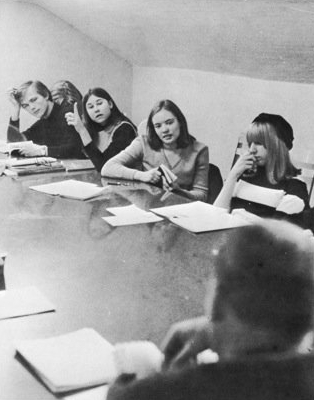
A Shimer class circa 1967

The presidency was assumed in 1954 by a former University of Chicago professor of medicine Francis Joseph Mullin, who began an aggressive fundraising campaign that approximately tripled incoming donations to $150,000 per year. In 1956, Shimer ceased to be affiliated with the University of Chicago. Mullin sought to build "a community of scholars where intellectual inquiry is the highest value".

The school faced imminent closure due to a financial and enrollment crisis leading up to the 1956–1957 school year, with enrollment still more than 50 students below the level of 200 that was considered sustainable. To address the crisis, Mullin recruited powerful corporate donors including General Motors executive Nelson Dezendorf. Dezendorf subsequently became chairman of the board.

In the early 1960s, Shimer gained national attention from a Time magazine article about the school highlighting its academic reputation. The article cited a survey by the Harvard Educational Review that ranked Shimer as among eleven small liberal arts colleges in the United States with an "ideal intellectual climate".

=== Grotesque Internecine Struggle ===
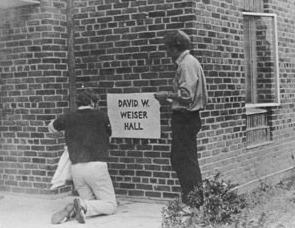
Students rename a building in honor of Dean David Weiser, a leading critic of F.J. Mullin.

In the 1960s, thanks in part to the Baby Boom, enrollment rose to an all-time high. By 1966, enrollment stood at 510 students. At the same time, the administration of Shimer became increasingly isolated from the community, as the president ceased teaching classes and strict conservative social mores continued to be enforced despite cultural changes. Restrictions over dress, conduct, and fraternization were a source of frustration for students. Tensions thus developed between the administration and older faculty on one hand, and the students and younger faculty on the other.

In 1966 and 1967, the school underwent a severe internal crisis subsequently known as the "Grotesque Internecine Struggle" or "GIS". The roots of the crisis involved a power struggle between the dean and younger faculty and president Mullin over Mullin's increasingly dictatorial style. The specific issues under dispute included an unwillingness by the president to involve the faculty in decisions on buildings and personnel issues, and to consult with them on matters affecting the college.

Early in the fall of 1966, Dean of the Faculty David Weiser wrote a letter to Mullin requesting his resignation. This was rejected, and Weiser resigned in February 1967, the fourth member of the faculty to do so. Mullin released a statement through a Chicago public relations firm stating that "the recent turmoil instigated by a now former member of the faculty is passing with the receipt of his resignation." However, 18 members of the faculty responded with a statement praising Weiser. The Board expressed its support for Mullin in its March 1967 meeting, at which registrar James M. Green was present as a representative of the dissidents. The Board also set up a committee of faculty and trustees to improve communication, and honored a request by the dissidents for increased administrative staff.

The dispute soon evolved into a bitter personal struggle in which the actual issues were secondary. Over time, the struggle began to impact the academic life of the school. Protests were held, including one in which faculty and students carried the coffin of the Spirit of Shimer to the president's house. An independent report to the Board was favorable to the dissidents, but this was disregarded by the Board. Most of the younger faculty departed in the summer of 1967.

The Grotesque Internecine Struggle led to the departure of many of the school's faculty and one-third of the students. The adverse publicity the school received as a result of the crisis was compounded by a 1968 article in Look magazine that described Shimer as "the Midwest mecca of the marijuana mystique". This publicity led to caution from both prospective students and their parents, further damaging enrollment.

In the fall of 1967, Mullin resigned from the presidency, departing on August 30, 1968. Mullin was replaced by Milburn Akers, a former editor of the Chicago Sun-Times who adopted a less adversarial style. Akers served until 1970. The presidency was then taken over by Robert Spencer Long, who served until the school's bankruptcy in 1974.

=== Bankruptcy ===
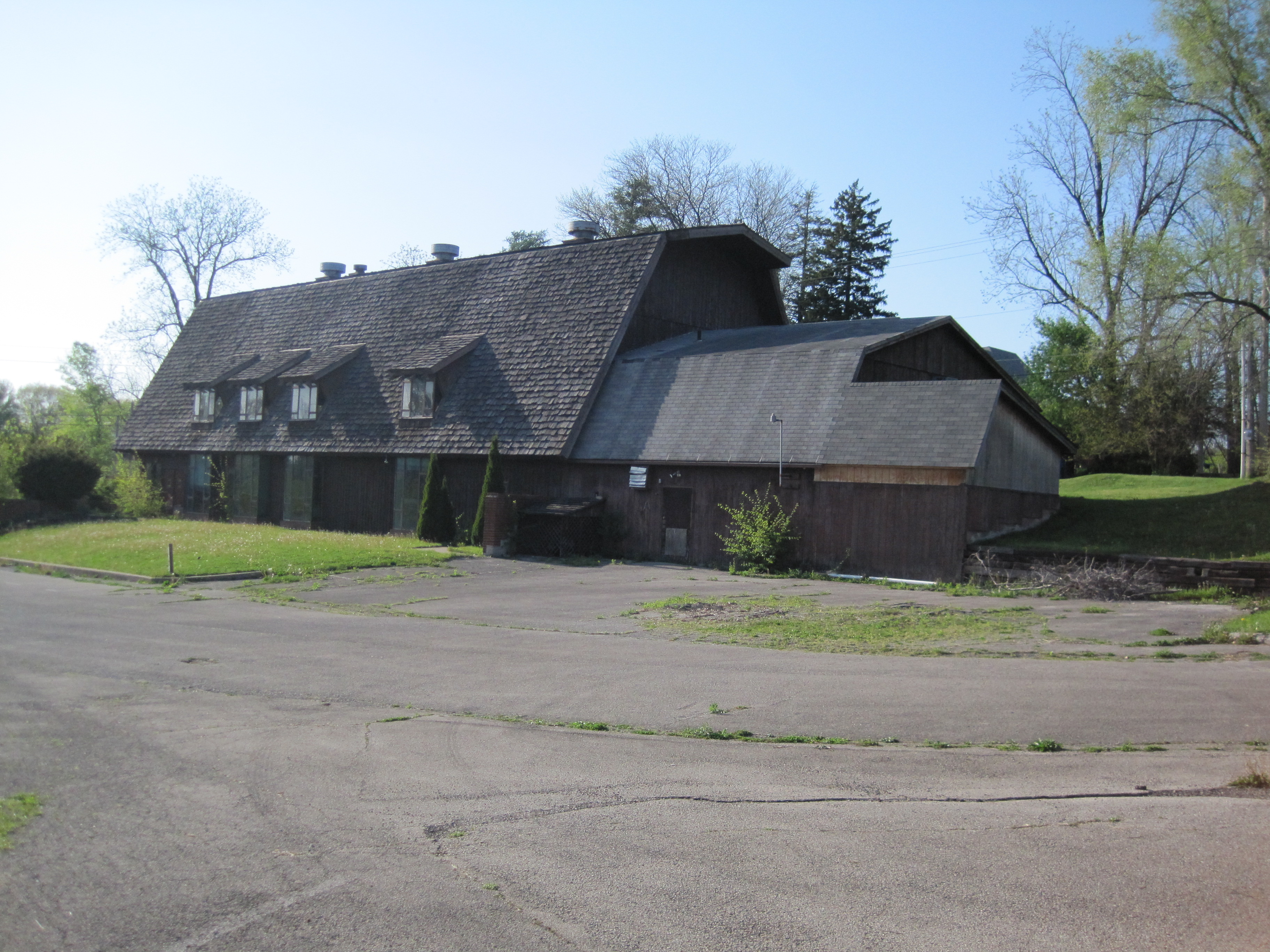
The former Karyn Kupcinet Playhouse on the former Shimer campus in Mount Carroll, Illinois. The building is currently a restaurant, banquet facility, and bar.

Enrollment continued to fall throughout the late 1960s and early 1970s, by approximately 50 students per year. In the fall of 1973, enrollment was 230 students, with 35 instructors. Debt exceeded $500,000. On November 10, 1973, the executive committee of the board of trustees voted to close the school at the end of December. The college entered into voluntary bankruptcy, and attorney Leonard Spira was appointed as liquidator.

Students protested the decision to close the school. A statement by student leaders noted that, because Shimer's education and community were unique in the world, "there is nowhere for us to go now." Working together, the faculty and students were able to raise $250,000 to stave off immediate closure. Spira resigned as liquidator in 1974, but financial difficulties continued due to the low enrollment and aging physical plant.

From 1974-1975, Esther G. Weinstein, Ph.D., former Associate Dean, became acting president. She was succeeded in the Fall of 1975 by urbanologist Ralph W. Conant, who promised to raise 5 million dollars. He was not successful, and on May 14, 1977, the Board again voted to close the school. The decision was reversed on May 23, with the adoption of a new reorganization plan. The Board refused to accept Conant's resignation, reassigning him to full-time fundraising.

Due to the falling enrollment and rising debt, the cost of maintaining the Mount Carroll campus became unsustainable. In the winter of 1978, an emergency decision was made to move the school to Waukegan, Illinois. The school's papers and books were moved to Waukegan in borrowed grain trucks the midst of the Blizzard of 1978. The Mount Carroll campus was purchased at auction for $170,000 by the Restoration College Association, a group of Mount Carroll residents who wished to prevent the campus from being broken up. It later became the site of the Campbell Center for Historic Preservation Studies. The move was to have extinguished the college's debt, but the college remained $1.2 million in debt in 1982.

Governance during this period reflected the college's difficult position. Most college governance in the mid to late 1970s was performed by the community as a whole, as the college's survival depended on the cooperation of the entire community. This was done through a purely democratic institution known as the "House".

== Shimer College in Waukegan ==
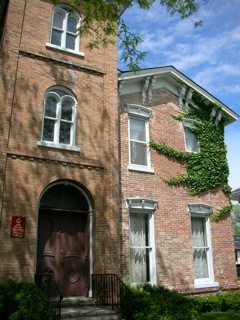
The 438 building, originally the sole building of the Waukegan campus and subsequently the main classroom building.

The college began classes in an old Victorian house on Sheridan Road in Waukegan in the spring of 1979. The campus initially consisted of one classroom and administration building and one dormitory. It grew steadily over subsequent years, reaching 12 buildings by the end of the 20th century.

The academics of the college remained intact in the Waukegan location, and efforts were made to reach out to new groups of students. In 1981, a Weekend College program for working adults was begun. The program, which as of 2010 remained in operation, provides a bachelor's degree through classes meeting intensively every third weekend. Enrollment rose from 62 students in 1978 to approximately 100 students by 1982. In the spring of 1988, the school graduated the largest class since 1974. In 1988, Shimer began to offer a chess scholarship. Subsequent beneficiaries of this scholarship include grandmasters Jesse Kraai and Noureddine Ziane.

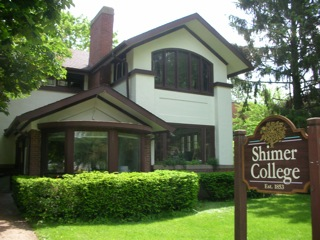
Prairie House, (the former YWCA) the main administration building of Shimer in Waukegan.

The internal governance structure in Waukegan differed from that in Mount Carroll. Shortly after the move, the House was replaced by the more structured Assembly. The first Assembly Constitution, inspired in part by the writings of Jean-Jacques Rousseau, was adopted in 1980. Under the Assembly system, most detailed work is performed by elected committees containing a mixture of students, faculty and staff. The Assembly itself governs by "moral suasion" only. Legal authority continued to reside in the Board of Trustees and the president. Donald P. Moon, an Episcopalian pastor and former nuclear physicist, remained president of Shimer from 1979 through his retirement in 2004. He was succeeded by William Craig Rice, under whose administration the college moved to Chicago.

Finances during much of this period remained problematic, with faculty salaries low or nonexistent. In 1980, the college obtained a major grant from the United States Department of Education, in preparation for which eight new members of the faculty were hired. However, the grant was not funded, and the senior members of the faculty went without pay so that the new instructors could be paid. Even when paid, the salaries were at a level that chairman of the board Barry Carroll described as "poverty-level".

In the mid-1990s, the college began an intensive upgrade of the physical plant, made possible by a municipal bond issued through Northern Trust. From 1995 to 1998, the total value of the college's real estate holdings rose approximately 40% to 2 million dollars. This included expansion of on-campus housing, renovation of the Prairie House administration building, and clearing of the central quadrangle. This also included the "Shimer Commons" plan for the former YWCA gymnasium, which was to have been funded by a capital campaign.

In 2005, negotiations began regarding an invitation extended by the Illinois Institute of Technology to move Shimer's operations to the IIT campus in Chicago. On December 18, 2005, amid controversy, the Assembly of Shimer College expressed its support for the ongoing negotiations by a vote of 46–29. On January 19, 2006, the Board of Trustees announced that it had accepted the invitation. The move was completed August 10, 2006.

== Shimer College in Chicago and Beyond ==
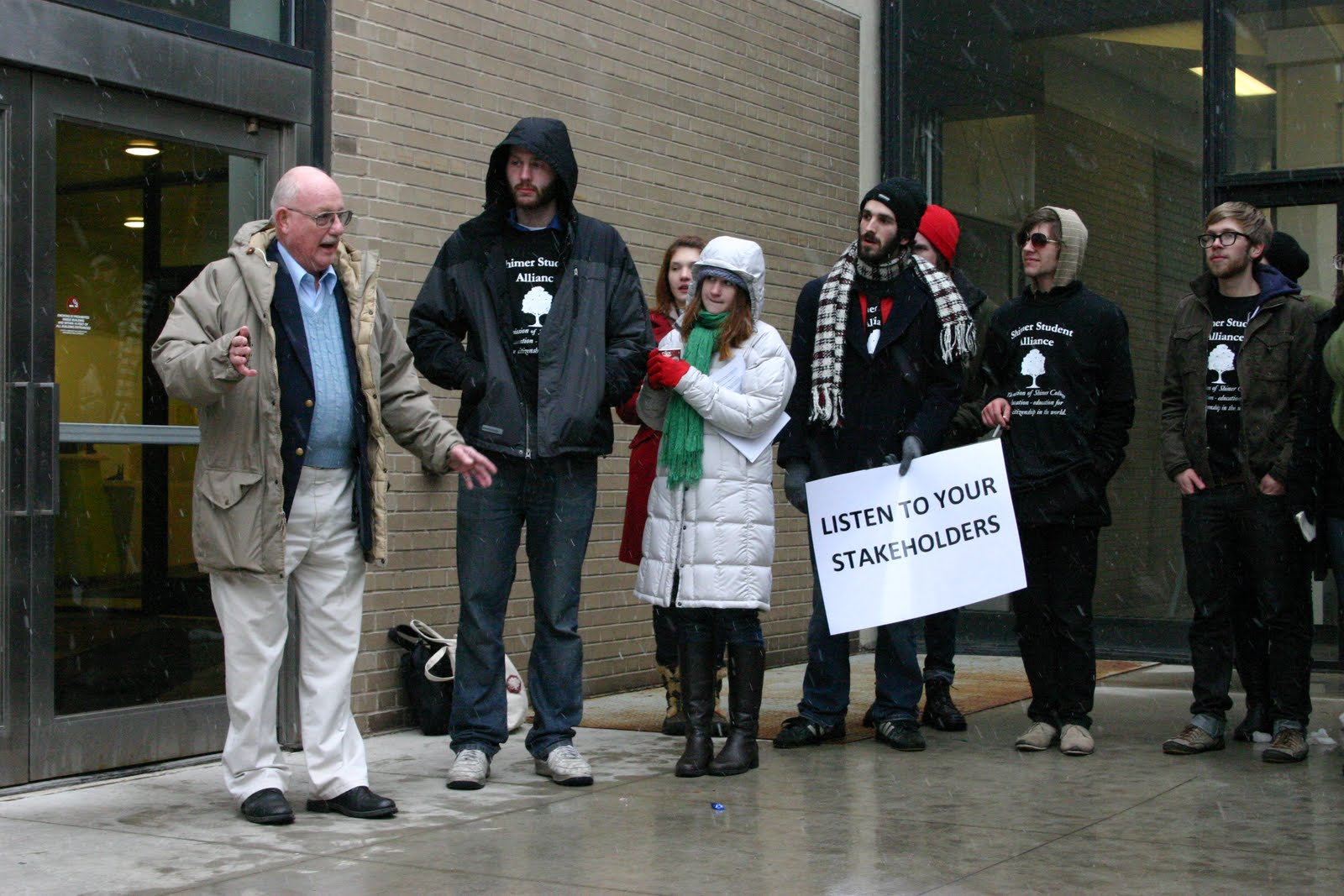
Trustee Patrick Parker speaks to protesting students at February 2010 meeting of Shimer College Board of Trustees.

In September 2007, just one year after completing the move he had pushed for, President William Craig Rice left abruptly for a position with the National Endowment for the Humanities. He was replaced by interim president Ron Champagne

Thomas Lindsay became president of Shimer College in January 2009. His subsequent tenure was marked by controversy over both his tactics and his long-term plans for the school. Controversy first broke out over Lindsay's hiring, outside of the standard process, of a personal acquaintance to replace a professional Director of Admissions whom he had also fired out of process. In November 2009, a meeting of the Shimer College Assembly, the internal governing body of the school, produced several resolutions demanding that Lindsay and the Board respect the Shimer College tradition of self-governance.

In January 2010, it was first made public that most of the trustees supporting Lindsay's actions also shared financial ties with Barre Seid, a Chicago industrialist and major donor to the school who had previously been anonymous. In February 2010, despite the unanimous objections of the faculty, strong opposition from the community as a whole, and protests by students, the Seid-dominated Board of Trustees approved a wholesale rewrite by Lindsay of the school's mission statement. Prior to the vote, Lindsay indicated to the faculty that anyone opposing his mission statement would be expected to leave the college. The vote passed by a secret ballot vote of 18–16.

On April 19, 2010, it was reported that the Shimer College Board of Trustees had voted to remove Lindsay from his post as president. The move came shortly after unanimous votes of no confidence by the faculty and Assembly.

Edward Noonan succeeded Lindsay as Interim President, serving for 2 years until the 2012 appointment of Susan Henking, the first female president since Frances Wood Shimer. Under Henking, Shimer strengthened its relationship with community colleges, undertaken the Shimer@60 program in which Chicago-ans 60 and over may take a free course, and increased the diversity of the student body. She led a transition for Shimer in which the College became the Shimer Great Books School of North Central College in 2017.
