= Celatoria diabroticae =

Scientific classification
- Kingdom: Animalia
- Phylum: Arthropoda
- Class: Insecta
- Order: Diptera
- Family: Tachinidae
- Subfamily: Exoristinae
- Tribe: Blondeliini
- Genus: Celatoria
- Species: C. diabroticae

Binomial name
- Celatoria diabroticae (Shimer, 1871)

Synonyms
- Celatoria crawii Coquillett, 1890; Tachina diabroticae Shimer, 1871

Species of fly

Celatoria diabroticae is a species of bristle fly in the family Tachinidae.

== Distribution ==
United States, Mexico.
