= Don Moon (educator) =

American academic and physicist (1936–2025)

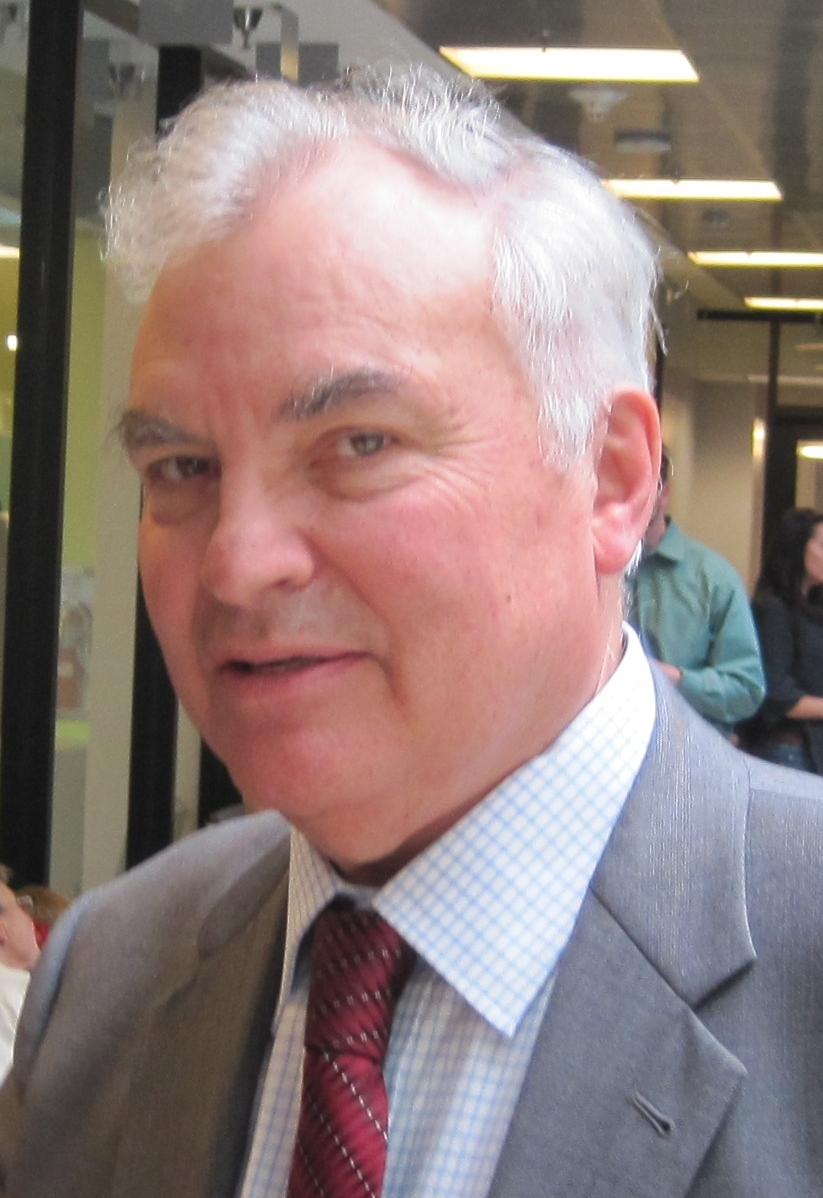
- Moon in 2010

11th President of Shimer College
- In office March 18, 1978 – 2004
- Preceded by: Ralph W. Conant
- Succeeded by: William Craig Rice

Personal details
- Born: February 8, 1936 Manila, Philippines
- Died: April 2, 2025 (aged 89)
- Education: Cornell University (BS); New York University (MS); Nashotah House (MDiv)
- Father: Don P. Moon

Don P. Moon Jr. (February 8, 1936 – April 2, 2025) was an American academic administrator, minister, and nuclear reactor physicist. He was the president of Shimer College from 1978 to 2004, and began serving on the faculty of Shimer College in 1967.

== Early life and education ==
Moon was born in 1936 in Manila. He was the son of Don P. Moon, an admiral in the United States Navy. Moon earned a Bachelor of Science in Engineering Physics from Cornell University in 1957, and a Master of Science in Reactor Engineering from New York University in 1958. Moon worked as a nuclear reactor physicist at Argonne National Laboratory from 1959 to 1964. He subsequently completed a Master of Divinity at Nashotah House, an Episcopalian seminary, in 1965.

== Career ==
From 1966 to 1967 Moon taught at Sauk Valley Community College in Dixon, Illinois.

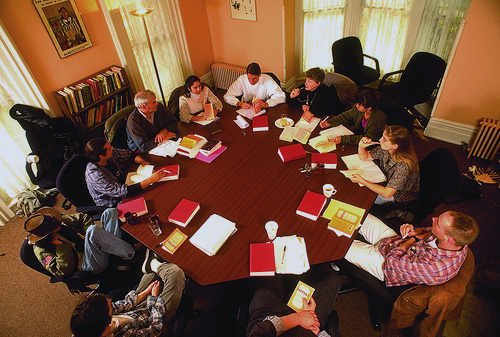
Don Moon co-facilitating a class at Shimer in 1995.

In 1967, Moon joined the natural sciences faculty of Shimer College in nearby Mount Carroll, Illinois. While an instructor, he held administrative positions including chairman of the Natural Sciences Program, director of the Oxford Program, dean of students and dean of faculty. After the attempted closure of the college by the board of trustees in 1973, Moon became one of a small group of faculty known as the Shimer Steering Committee, who coordinated efforts to save the college.

Moon became president of Shimer College on March 18, 1978. The college moved from Mount Carroll to Waukegan in the winter of that year, remaining there until 2006. Moon's leadership style as president was characterized as "collegial and low key", and he was credited with providing a necessary calming influence during the difficult negotiations surrounding the liquidation of the Mount Carroll Campus. During Moon's subsequent tenure, enrollment more than tripled, from 40 students to 130, and the new Waukegan campus was expanded from two buildings to 12. In 2004, Moon stepped down from the presidency but continued to teach; he was succeeded as president by William Craig Rice.

== See also ==
- History of Shimer College
- List of Shimer College people

== Works cited ==
- Patrick H. Moorhead (1983). "President Don Moon (1978- )". The Shimer College presidency : 1930 to 1980 (D.Ed. thesis). Loyola University Chicago. OCLC 9789513.
