= International Business College (El Paso, Texas) =

Location
- El Paso, Texas; United States; 31.716877°N 106.308043°W

Information
- Type: For-profit college
- Motto: Finish First
- Established: 1898
- President: Jerry Martin
- Faculty: 16 (10 full-time)
- Enrollment: 311
- Accreditation: Accrediting Council for Independent Colleges and Schools (until 2016)
- Website: Official website

International Business College (IBC) is a for-profit college located in El Paso, Texas. The institution was founded in 1898 and is the oldest college in El Paso. IBC has been accredited by the Accrediting Council for Independent Colleges and Schools since 1969.

== History ==
The school was founded in downtown El Paso in 1898 by Joseph Peter Mullin, whose son was Francis Joseph Mullin. Shortly after Mullin's death in 1921, IBC was sold to J.E. Gilkey in 1922. The school received its first accreditation two years later, from the National Association of Commercial Schools.

In the 1980s, the school opened numerous branch campuses, as far away as Lubbock, Texas. By 1993, these had all been sold, as part of a decision to focus on El Paso, where the school continues to operate two locations. In 2003, the school was accredited to offer its first degree program, the Associate of Applied Science in Business Management. In 2012, it was sold to Innovative Education Solutions.

== Academics ==
IBC offers courses in business, technology, and healthcare. Most students enroll in short-term certifications in healthcare. The school is accredited to offer associate degree programs in business, criminal justice, and paralegal studies, but, as of 2013, only the business program had any enrollees.

== Accreditation ==
IBC was accredited by the Accrediting Council for Independent Colleges and Schools until May 2016 to award diplomas and associate degrees.

== Notable alumni ==
- Lucy G. Acosta, class of 1945
