= Don P. Moon =

United States Navy admiral (1894–1944)

Don Pardee Moon
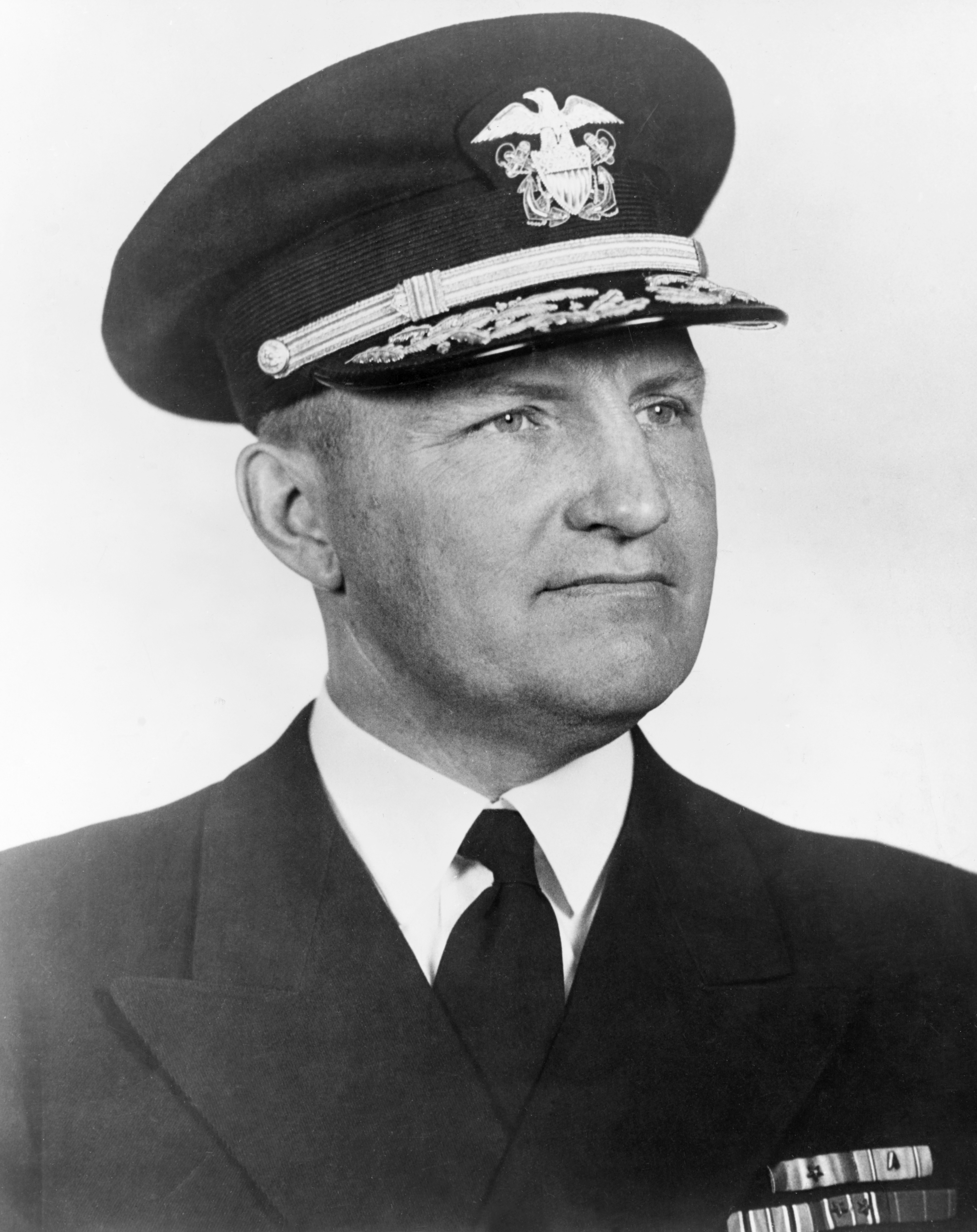
- Moon in 1944
- Born: April 18, 1894; Kokomo, Indiana, U.S.
- Died: August 5, 1944 (aged 50); Aboard the USS Bayfield, Naples, Italy
- Burial place: Arlington National Cemetery
- Military career
- Allegiance: United States
- Branch: United States Navy
- Service years: 1916–1944
- Rank: Rear admiral
- Commands: USS John D. Ford
- Conflicts: World War I World War II
- Awards: Distinguished Service Medal; Legion of Merit

Don Pardee Moon (April 18, 1894 – August 5, 1944) was a rear admiral of the United States Navy, who fought in the invasion of Europe. He was born in Kokomo, Indiana, United States. He married and had four children.

== Biography ==
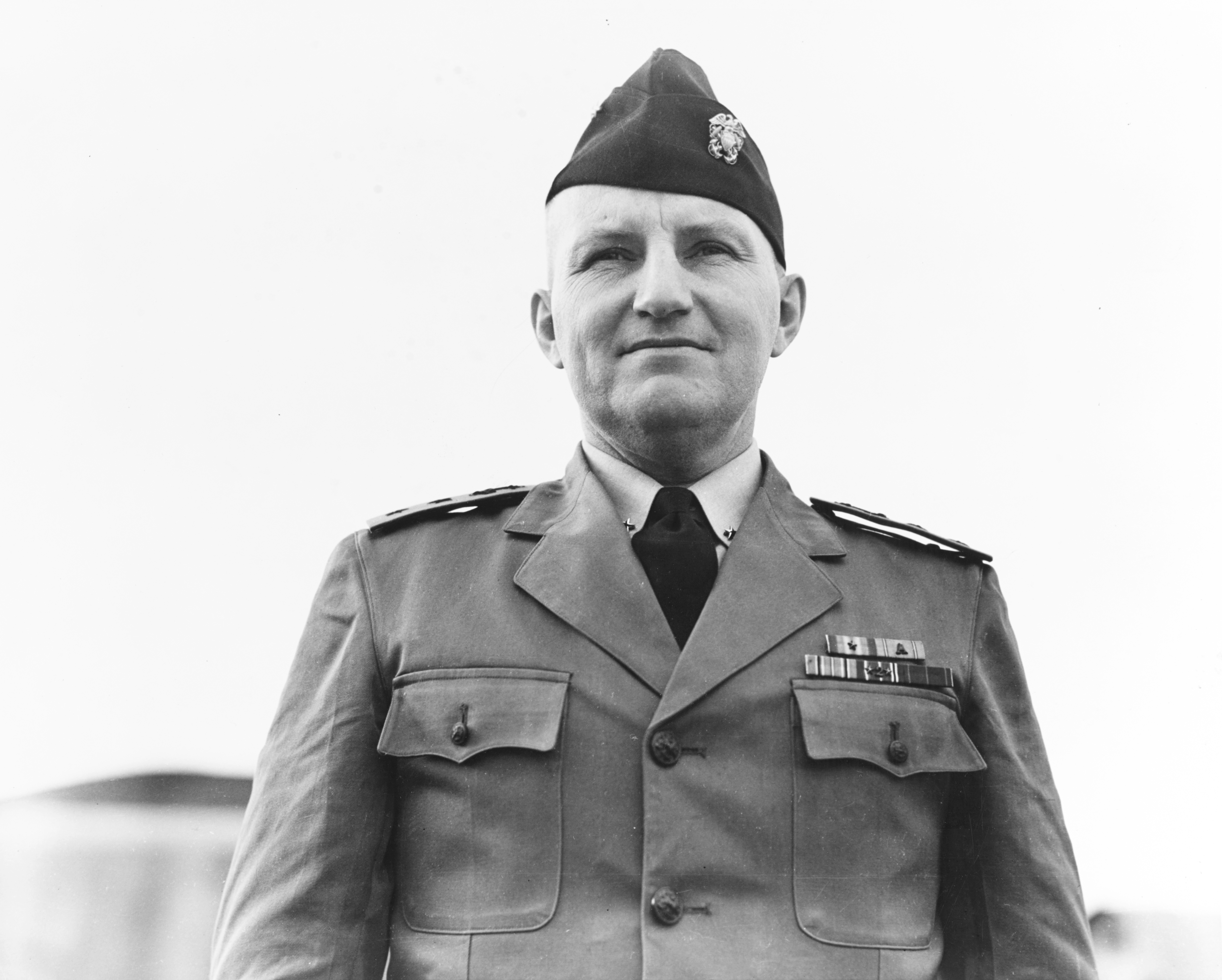
Moon at the Amphibious Training Base, Algiers, Algeria (March 24, 1944)

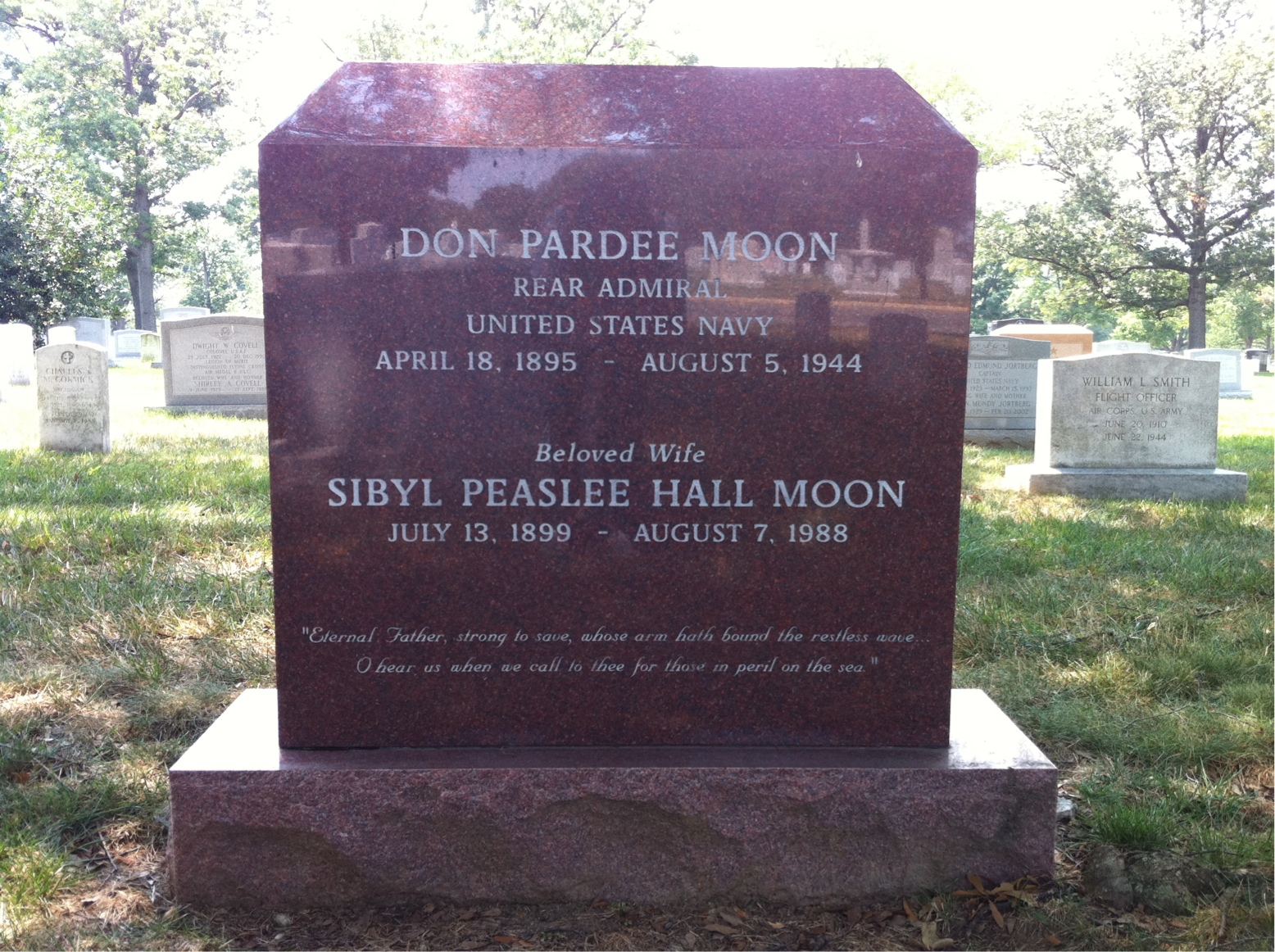
Grave at Arlington National Cemetery

Moon entered the United States Naval Academy and later graduated fourth in the Class of 1916, being particularly efficient in gunnery.

He was assigned to the battleship Arizona (BB-39) and while there developed several instruments to improve gunnery. He later served in the battleships Colorado (BB-45) and Nevada (BB-36) before returning to shore duty in 1926.

By 1934 he was commanding officer of the Asiatic Fleet destroyer John D. Ford (DD-228).

He was later put in command of a destroyer division in 1940 and became a captain in 1941. He took part in the invasion of North Africa in 1942.

In 1944 he was promoted to rear admiral. He commanded Exercise Tiger, a multi-day rehearsal for D-Day, in which a communication error on 27 April resulted in friendly-fire bombardment of troops, followed on 28 April with three LSTs being torpedoed and sunk by German E-boats near Slapton Sands. Between the two incidents, an estimated 1,200 US servicemen were killed during the rehearsal exercise.

During the June 6, 1944, invasion of Normandy he directed the landings on Utah Beach from the attack transport Bayfield (APA-33). For three weeks the Bayfield was in position off Utah Beach and officers and men were on four-hour rotating shifts for this entire time. Shortly afterwards the Bayfield was sent to Naples for the invasion of Southern France. However, on August 5, 1944, Moon shot himself with his .45 caliber pistol. His suicide was attributed to battle fatigue. He was posthumously decorated with Legion of Honour by the Government of France.

Moon was buried at Arlington National Cemetery.

He was survived by his wife Sibyl, and his four children, Meredith, Don, David, and Peter.

== Memorials ==
Moon was depicted on a 2004 postage stamp issued to mark the 60th anniversary of D-Day by Sierra Leone.

== See also ==
- List of U.S. general officers and flag officers killed in World War II
