= Milburn Akers =

American journalist and academic administrator (1900–1970)

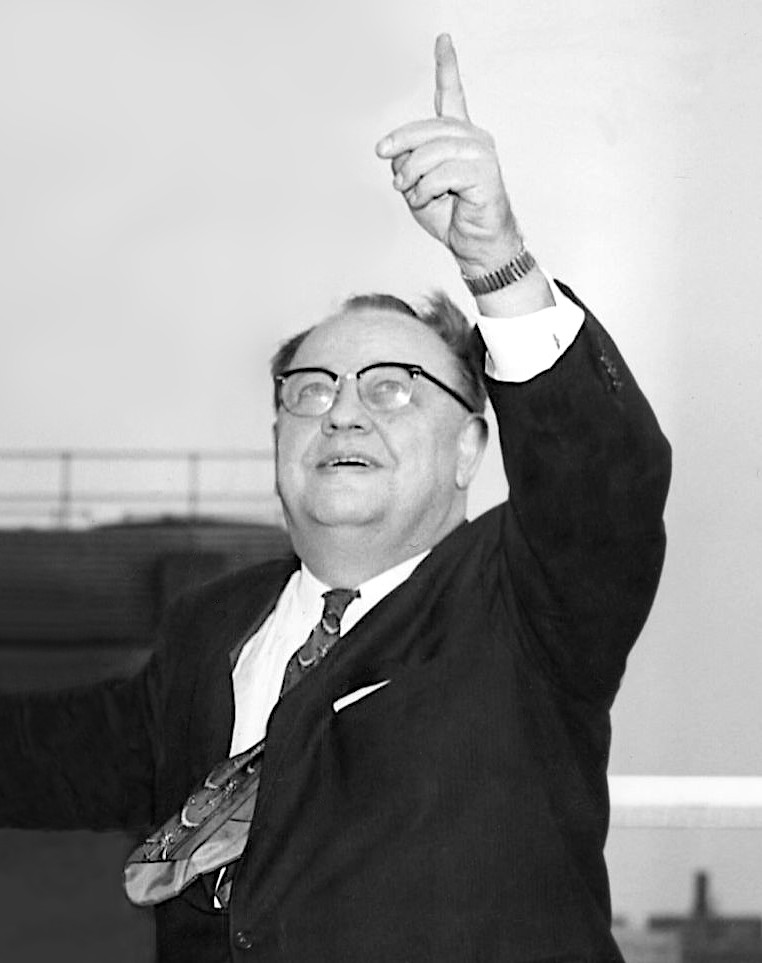
- Akers in 1958

President of Shimer College
- In office 1968–1970
- Preceded by: Francis Joseph Mullin
- Succeeded by: Robert Long

Personal details
- Born: May 4, 1900 Chicago, Illinois, U.S.
- Died: May 27, 1970 (aged 70) near Hopedale, Illinois, U.S.
- Occupation: Journalist; academic administrator
- Nickname: Pete Akers

Milburn Peter Akers (May 4, 1900 – May 27, 1970), often known as Pete Akers, was a Chicago journalist, chairman of the board of trustees of McKendree College, and the ninth president of Shimer College.

== Early life and education ==
Akers was born in Chicago and graduated from McKendree College, of which his great-grandfather had been the first president. In his early life, he worked as a staff reporter for newspapers including the Peoria Transcript and Illinois State Register. He served as the publicity man for Governor Henry Horner from 1937 to Horner's death in 1940.

== Career ==
Akers joined the Chicago Sun, later the Chicago Sun-Times, shortly after its founding in 1941. He became executive editor of the Sun-Times in 1950, rising from the position of managing editor; his position became simply "editor" after the departure of Marshall Field III from that position. After retiring from the paper in 1965, he became an important figure in Illinois higher education due in part to his political ties. From 1965 to 1967 he served as president of the Federation of Independent Illinois Colleges and Universities.

In 1968, Akers was appointed president of Shimer College following the resignation of Francis Joseph Mullin in the aftermath of the Grotesque Internecine Struggle.

== Death ==
On May 27, 1970, Akers was killed in a head-on collision with a truck south of Hopedale, Illinois. He had been traveling to Springfield, Illinois to lobby for a law providing greater aid to small liberal arts colleges such as Shimer.

== See also ==
- History of Shimer College
