= Ronald Champagne =

American higher education administrator

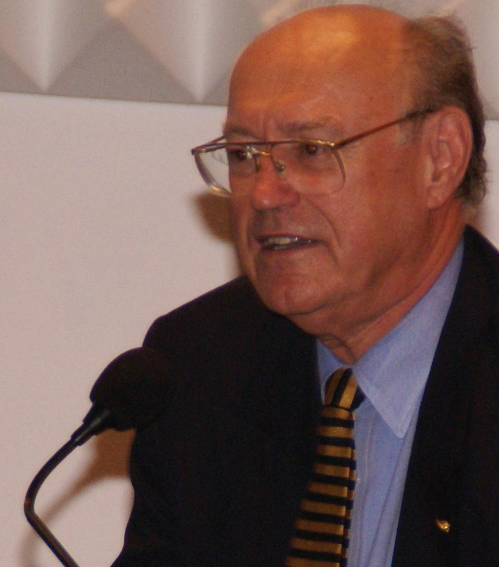
Ronald O. Champagne

Ronald Oscar Champagne (born 1942) is an American higher education administrator.

Champagne was born in Rhode Island. He holds a bachelor's degree from Duquesne University and master's degrees from Fordham University and Catholic University of America. He earned his Ph.D. at Fordham in the foundations of mathematics and physics. He was the first member of his family to attend college.

He served as president of Saint Xavier University from 1982 to 1994. He was also interim president at a number of colleges including Shimer College from 2007 to 2008, Merrimack College from 2008 to 2010, Roger Williams University from 2010 to 2011, and Elmira College from 2012 to 2015.

== See also ==
- History of Shimer College
- List of Shimer College people
