= William Parker McKee =

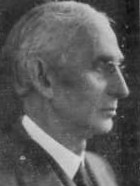
William Parker McKee in 1930, at the end of his career

William Parker McKee (1862–1933) was an American educator and Baptist minister. He served as the chief executive of Shimer College from 1897 to 1930, a position known at the time as "Dean". During this period the school was known by turns as the Frances Shimer Academy, Frances Shimer School, and Frances Shimer Junior College. The second executive of the college following its founder Frances Shimer, Dean McKee was also the second longest-serving executive in Shimer's history. He oversaw the rebuilding of the campus following the fire of 1906, and the commencement of the junior college program shortly thereafter.

== Early life ==
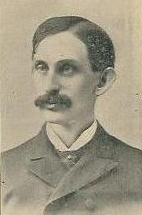
McKee in 1898

McKee was born on August 8, 1862, in Indianola, Illinois. Parker was the family name of his mother, Hattie Parker McKee. His father was Melvin McKee, a Baptist minister in Indianola. McKee attended Wabash Preparatory School, and graduated from Wabash College with an A.B. in 1883. He graduated from the Theological Seminary of the University of Chicago with a Bachelor of Divinity in 1887. In the same year, he became pastor of the Olivet Baptist Church in Minneapolis, where he served for ten years.

In 1895, McKee began graduate studies in history at the University of Minnesota. He graduated from the University of Minnesota with an A.M. in 1897. From 1896 to 1897, he was president of the Baptist Young People's Union of Minnesota.

McKee was married twice. On August 23, 1887, McKee married Nettie Hartley. On July 20, 1890, she gave birth to a son, Howard Harper McKee, who subsequently became a professor of geology. She died on September 8, 1894. On June 27, 1901, McKee married Florence Turner of Chicago. On September 21, 1902, she gave birth to a daughter named Margaret Elizabeth.

== Deanship ==
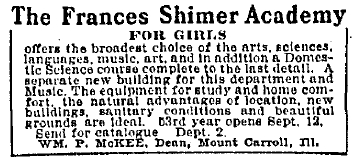
An advertisement placed by McKee in the Chicago Daily Tribune, 1906

In August 1897, McKee accepted an invitation from William Rainey Harper to become Dean of the Frances Shimer Academy of the University of Chicago, located in Mount Carroll, Illinois. Harper had previously orchestrated the affiliation of the school to the University of Chicago the previous year. McKee was officially installed as Dean on July 1, 1897, and moved to Mount Carroll with his mother and son in August 1897. Also in 1897, McKee received a "reenacted" B.D. from the University of Chicago.

McKee assumed the Deanship after a brief period (1896–1897) in which control of the school had resided in a non-resident principal at the University of Chicago, whose decisions were implemented by the resident dean in Mount Carroll. With McKee's installation as Dean, decisionmaking became centralized in Mount Carroll as it had been under his predecessor, school founder Frances Shimer.

Frances Shimer had avoided overt fundraising and student recruitment, but under McKee these were pursued aggressively. These efforts were aided in time by the estates of Frances Shimer and longtime associate principal Adelia C. Joy. By the time of McKee's retirement, the college had more than 200 students.

McKee arrived at the school under conditions of falling enrollment and low morale. Enrollment for the 1896–1897 academic year had dropped to 61 students. In the 1897-1898 year this rose to 97, and was 94 the following year. This was considered sufficient by the board of trustees to authorize additional construction, beginning with South Hall in the summer of 1899. This was followed by Dearborn Hall for music in 1903, and the Hathaway Hall dormitory in 1905. This led to the transformation of the campus from the agricultural look of the 19th century to a classic college quadrangle.

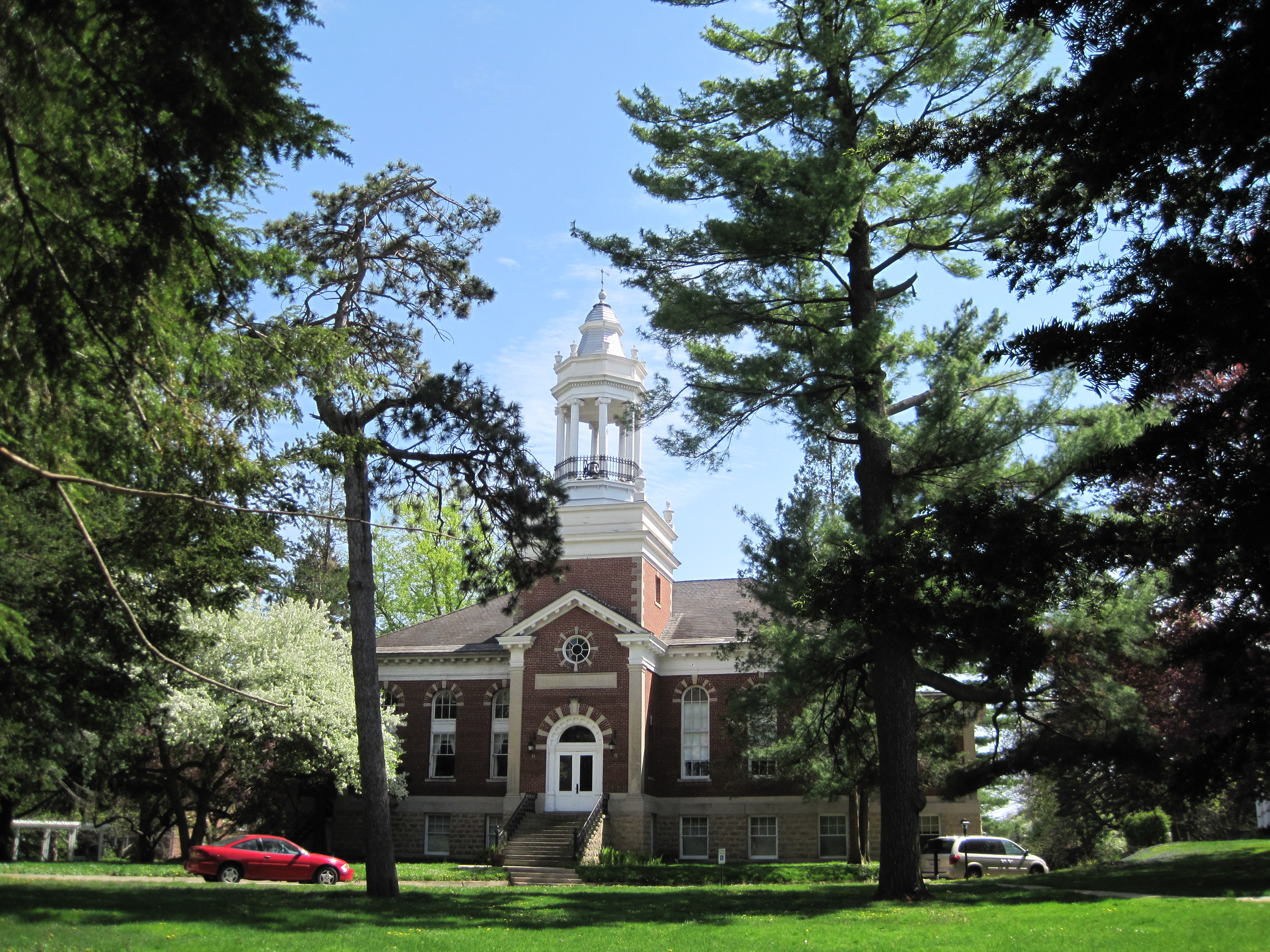
Metcalf Hall, completed in 1908, two years after the fire.

In February 1906, the entire campus except for the two most recent buildings was destroyed by fire. As he watched the academy burn, "those around him heard his words vowing to rebuild the campus." This was accomplished, with help from donors including Andrew Carnegie, and by the time of McKee's retirement the campus consisted of 12 brick buildings in the Georgian Revival style, all constructed during McKee's tenure. The last of these to be constructed was the gymnasium, which was financed by a $10,000 loan against the operating budget.

In addition to serving as Dean, which was equivalent to the modern position of President, McKee also served as an instructor of history at the academy. He was known for maintaining an atmosphere of collegiality, and created a tradition of reading James Whitcomb Riley to the students in the evenings. He was also responsible for creating a number of other Shimer traditions, including the May Fete.

In the final years of his presidency, McKee grew increasingly remote from the college and faculty. This became a source of concern to the Board by 1929, and it was found that Mrs. McKee was by that time performing many of the duties of the Dean. McKee submitted his resignation on November 29, 1929, and was succeeded in 1930 by Floyd Wilcox. The McKees moved to Urbana, Illinois, where McKee died in 1933.

== Works ==
- 1899, "Transient and Permanent Elements in Deuteronomy", in The Biblical World, edited by William Rainey Harper et al., vol. 13, pp. 249–251.
- 1900, "Change in the Curricula of Girls' Schools", The Standard, vol. 47, p. 1510.

== See also ==
- History of Shimer College
