= Francis Joseph Mullin =

American academic and academic administrator (1906–1997)

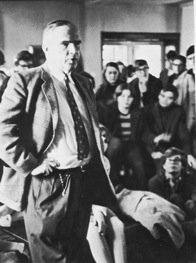
- Mullin, c. 1967

President of Shimer College
- In office 1954–1968
- Preceded by: Aaron Brumbaugh
- Succeeded by: Milburn Akers

Personal details
- Born: December 16, 1906 El Paso, Texas, U.S.
- Died: February 13, 1997 (aged 90) El Paso, Texas, U.S.
- Spouse: Alma Gray Hill (m. 1935)
- Children: 2
- Education: University of Missouri (BS, MS, PhD)
- Occupation: Professor; academic administrator
- Nicknames: F.J. Mullin; Joe Mullin

Francis Joseph Mullin (December 16, 1906 – February 13, 1997), also often known as F.J. Mullin or Joe Mullin, was an American academic and the seventh president of Shimer College. He was raised Catholic, but became an Episcopalian as a teenager. He was key in engineering Shimer's brief period as an Episcopal-affiliated college; the school had previously had a Baptist affiliation.

== Early life and education ==
Mullin was born on December 16, 1906, in El Paso, Texas. He was the second son of Joseph Peter Mullin, who was the head of the International Business College in El Paso. His older brother was the historian and oil industry executive Robert N. Mullin. He was orphaned at age 14, and passed from one relative to another. While living with his aunt, he converted from the Catholicism of his father's Irish family to the Episcopal faith of the maternal Norville side of his family.

Mullin received his bachelor's degree from the University of Missouri in 1929, and went on to study at the University of Chicago, where he completed his Master of Science in 1933 and his PhD in 1936.

From 1936 to 1938 Mullin was on the faculty of the University of Texas Medical Branch at Galveston. Mullin served as a professor of medicine at the University of Chicago from 1939 to 1951, as well as serving as dean of students there for part of this time. He also served as dean of the faculties and professor of physiology at the Chicago Medical School from 1951 to 1954.

== Career ==
In 1954 Mullin assumed the presidency of Shimer College, then located in Mount Carroll, Illinois. Shimer had adopted a four-year Great Books curriculum in 1950. Mullin sought to build "a community of scholars where intellectual inquiry is the highest value". The college at the time had extremely low levels of fundraising, due in part to its previous history as a junior college. Mullin tripled fundraising to approximately $150,000 per year, but nonetheless the college faced insolvency in the summer of 1956. By recruiting General Motors executive Nelson Dezendorf as a donor and trustee, Mullin was able to keep the college open.

In 1966, an internal struggle broke out within Shimer that subsequently became known as the "Grotesque Internecine Struggle". A group of dissident faculty, led initially by Dean David W. Weiser, complained that Mullin did not share the governance of the college sufficiently. With the support of the board, Mullin prevailed, but this led to the loss of a large number of students and faculty. Mullin tendered his resignation in 1967, and retired in August 1968.

== Personal life and death ==
Mullin married Alma Gray Hill on May 29, 1935. The couple had two sons. One of them was Mark Mullin, who authored a memoir including reminiscences of his father, entitled The Headmaster's Run (ISBN 1578866545). The other was noted oceanographer Michael Mullin.

He died on February 13, 1997, in El Paso, Texas.

== Works cited ==
- Mullin, Mark (2008). The Headmaster's Run. Rowman & Littlefield Education. ISBN 978-1578866540.

== See also ==
- History of Shimer College
