= Aaron Brumbaugh =

American professor and academic administrator (1890–1983)

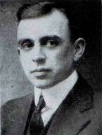

President of Shimer College
- In office 1950–1954
- Preceded by: Albin Bro
- Succeeded by: Francis Joseph Mullin

Personal details
- Born: Aaron John Brumbaugh; February 14, 1890 Hartville, Ohio, U.S.
- Died: February 25, 1983 (aged 93) Dunedin, Florida, U.S.
- Spouse: Marjorie Ruth
- Education: Mount Morris College (BA); University of Chicago (MA, PhD)
- Occupation: Professor; academic administrator

Aaron John Brumbaugh (February 14, 1890 – February 25, 1983) was a higher education administrator and professor of education, and the sixth president of Shimer College.

== Early life ==
Brumbaugh was born in Hartville, Ohio on February 14, 1890. He subsequently became a teacher and superintendent in local schools, before traveling to Mount Morris College in Mount Morris, Illinois, where he received his BA in 1914. He served as the superintendent of the Mount Morris schools from 1914 to 1915, and as professor of English at Mount Morris College from 1915 to 1918. In 1918 he received his MA from the University of Chicago, and was named Dean at Mount Morris College. In 1921 he became president of Mount Morris College, a position which he held until resigning in 1925.

== Career ==
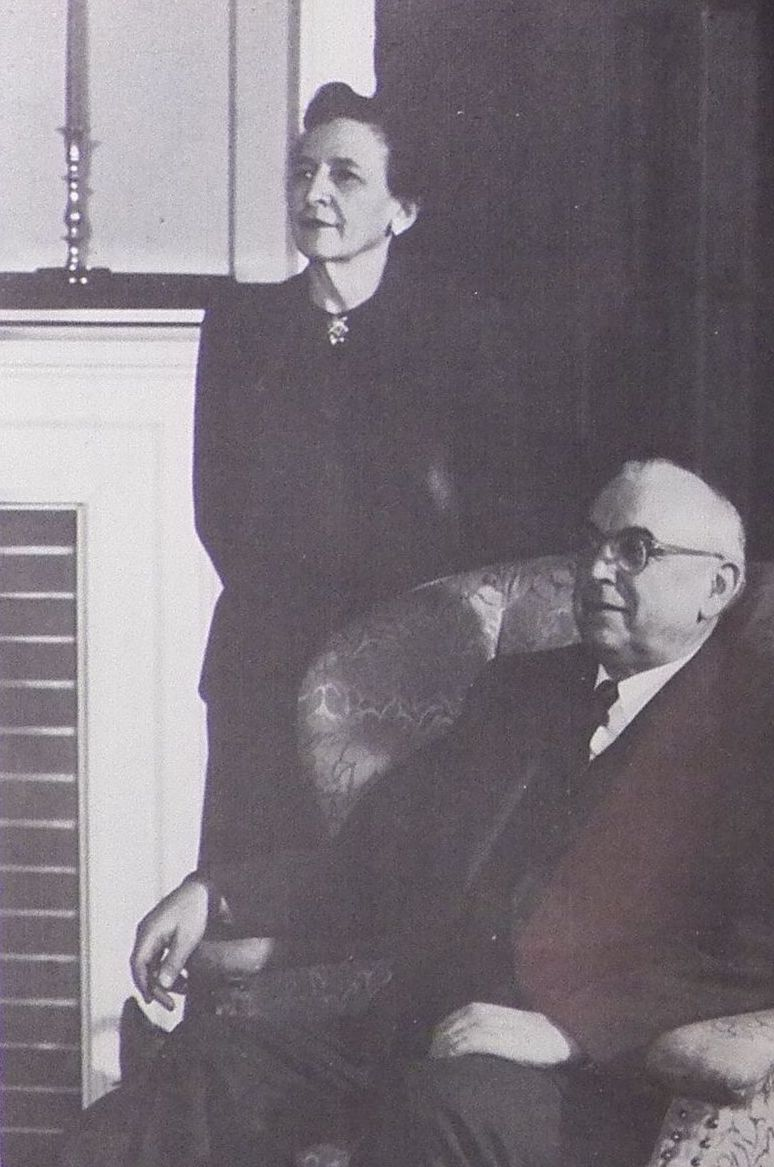
A.J. Brumbaugh and Ruth Sherrick Brumbaugh, at Shimer College c. 1952

Brumbaugh taught at the University of Chicago beginning in 1926, and completed his Ph.D. there in 1929 with a dissertation on the authority of school boards as defined by the courts. He became an associate professor in 1935 and rose to full professor the following year, holding that rank until his retirement in 1944. In 1937, he became president of the American College Personnel Association.

In 1941, Robert Maynard Hutchins appointed Brumbaugh Dean of Students at the College of the University of Chicago. He had previously held the position of acting dean. Brumbaugh retired from the university in 1944 but remained active in professional associations.

As president of Shimer College in Mount Carroll, Illinois from 1950 to 1954, Brumbaugh presided over the transition of the Shimer curriculum from a women's junior college to a four-year coeducational Great Books college. He was the first president to preside over the school under its current name, as the name was changed from "Frances Shimer College" to "Shimer College" at the time that the school became coeducational.

In 1955, Brumbaugh left Shimer to take a staff position with the Southern Regional Education Board in Atlanta, Georgia. He held this position until retiring for the second time in 1970.

== Personal life and death ==
He and his wife, Marjorie Ruth Brumbaugh, then moved to Florida.

He died on February 25, 1983 in Dunedin, Florida.

== See also ==
- History of Shimer College
