= Robert Spencer Long =

American academic administrator (1927–2015)

President of Shimer College
- In office 1970–1974
- Preceded by: Milburn Akers
- Succeeded by: Ralph Conant

Personal details
- Born: June 1927 North Side, Chicago, Illinois, U.S.
- Died: December 25, 2015 (aged 88) San Francisco, California, U.S.
- Education: University of Chicago (BA, MS, PhD)
- Occupation: Professor; academic administrator

Military service
- Allegiance: United States
- Branch/service: United States Navy
- Years of service: 1945–1948

Robert Spencer Long (June 1927 – December 25, 2015) was a professor of physical science and the tenth president of Shimer College.

== Early life and education ==
Long was born on the north side of Chicago, Illinois, in June 1927. He graduated from Roger C. Sullivan High School in the Rogers Park neighborhood in 1945. He enlisted in the United States Navy on July 31, 1945, and served for three years.

H then studied at the University of Chicago, where he obtained a BA in 1951, a Master of Science in 1955, and a PhD in Geochemistry in 1964.

== Career ==
He subsequently taught at Nasson College in Maine, New College of Florida, and at the University of Puerto Rico before becoming Dean at Roger Williams College.

Long assumed the position of President of Shimer College on 3 June 1970, shortly after previous president Milburn Akers was killed in car accident. He took control of a college with rapidly dropping enrollment and rising debt, problems which continued to worsen throughout his tenure. Long increased gift income to $300,000 per year, but this was not sufficient to counteract the financial problems. In November 1973, the Board of Trustees announced that Shimer would close at the end of the year. Although an emergency fundraising campaign by faculty and students kept the college open, Long resigned at the end of 1973. He publicly stated that the college would be unable to survive.

Long later worked for 18 years at the National Academy of Sciences in Washington, DC.

== Later life and death ==
He spent his retirement years in San Francisco, California where he died at the age of 88 on December 25, 2015 surrounded by family.

== See also ==
- History of Shimer College
