= Floyd Wilcox =

President of Shimer College (1886–1958)

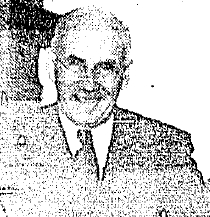
Floyd Wilcox in 1942

Floyd Cleveland Wilcox (March 17, 1886 – April 20, 1958) was the third president of Shimer College, serving from 1930 to 1935. His leadership, though marked by controversy, saw the school through the most difficult years of the Great Depression. He oversaw the transition of the school's curriculum from a two-year to a four-year junior college program.

Wilcox was born in Mason, Michigan on March 17, 1886. Wilcox obtained a Bachelor of Arts from Kalamazoo College in 1910, and subsequently studied at the Newton Theological Institute in Massachusetts until 1911. In 1913, he obtained a Bachelor of Divinity from the Union Theological Seminary in the City of New York. In 1920, he obtained a Master of Arts in Education from the Teachers' College of Columbia University. He subsequently traveled to California and received a Cubberly Fellowship at Stanford University, where he earned a Doctor of Education from the Stanford Graduate School of Education in 1930. Wilcox's graduate study focused on the junior college, and this was a significant factor in his selection for the presidency of Shimer.

1930 was also the end of the tenure of Shimer's second president, William Parker McKee, who had served since 1897. He had also served in administrative positions at schools in China. Based on this experience, his graduate studies, and the recommendations of prominent educators, Wilcox was unanimously recommended by the search committee and approved by the Shimer College Board of Trustees, at a salary of $5000 per year.

== Presidency ==
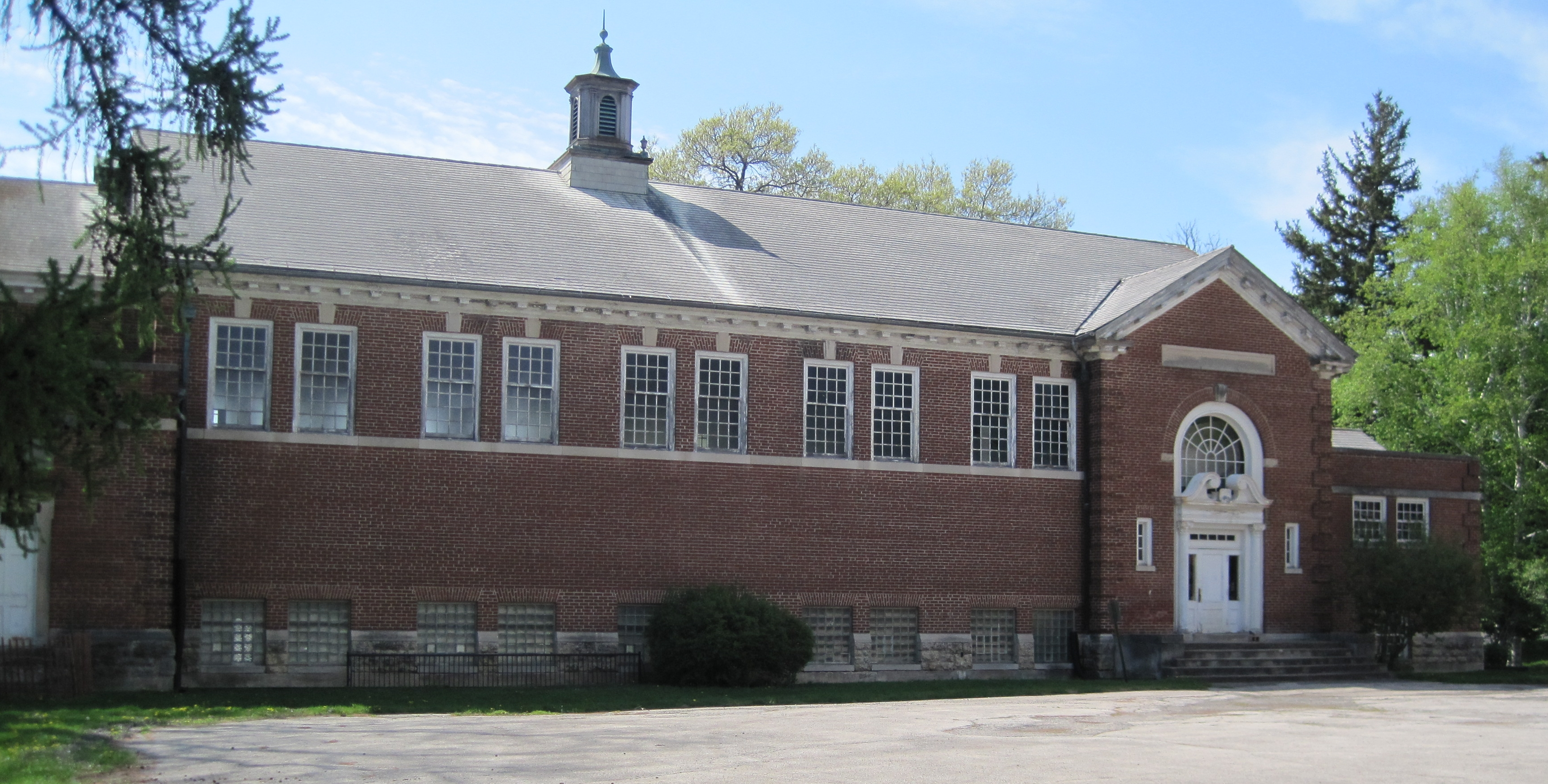
The Gymnasium on the Shimer campus, a source of financial difficulty for the Wilcox administration.

Upon assuming the presidency of the school, then known as the Frances Shimer School and located in Mount Carroll, Illinois, Wilcox encountered significant administrative and financial obstacles. Due to the administrative vacuum in the late years of the McKee administration, local members of the Board of Trustees had become actively involved in college governance, which made it difficult for Wilcox to assert his authority. A loan for more than $10,000 had been taken out against operating funds to pay for the construction of the gymnasium in 1929, but no provision had been made to pay it back. An auditor's report in 1930 further cited "numerous evidences of carelessness in the handling of accounts".

Wilcox used his training in educational administration to implement various changes in Shimer's operations. In the first year of the Wilcox administration, the curriculum was changed from a combined University-preparatory school and two-year junior college to a four-year junior college. In recognition of this, in 1932, the name of the college was changed from "Frances Shimer School" to "Frances Shimer Junior College". Wilcox also expressed concern about reducing the school's high attrition rate, and in 1933-1934 relaxed school rules to provide the students with greater freedom and responsibility. In addition, he simplified the fee structure and hired guidance personnel including a psychologist.

Beginning in 1931, the power struggle between Wilcox and local trustees led by Samuel J. Campbell intensified, as financial pressures due to the Depression forced austerity measures including a 10% reduction in faculty pay. In the first years of the Wilcox administration, enrollment fell from 215 to 129, which led many faculty to feel that Wilcox was not properly addressing recruitment and promotion issues. The faculty also felt that their voices were not being heard by the Board, because they were filtered through Wilcox's reports. After Campbell issued a second call for the Board to meet to discuss problems with Wilcox, Wilcox tendered his resignation on April 27, 1935, effective June 30 of that year. He was succeeded by A. Beth Hostetter, longtime instructor and administrative officer who served as Acting President until the appointment of Raymond Culver in 1936.

Wilcox received an honorary doctorate of divinity from his alma mater Kalamazoo College in 1932.

== Later life ==
After leaving Shimer, Wilcox moved with his family to Menlo Park, California and undertook additional postgraduate study at Stanford. He subsequently served at Linfield College in Oregon. In 1939, he left Linfield for the University of Redlands, where he served as the director of curriculum, guidance and admissions. He retired in 1954.

== See also ==
- History of Shimer College
- List of Shimer College people
