= Ralph W. Conant =

American academic (1926–2017)

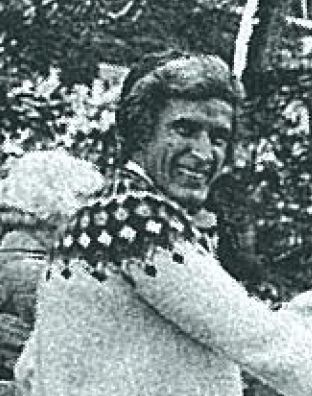
- Conant in 1976

President of Unity College
- In office 1978–1980

President of Shimer College
- In office 1975–1978
- Preceded by: Robert Long
- Succeeded by: Don Moon

Personal details
- Born: Ralph Wendell Conant; September 7, 1926
- Died: 2017 (aged 90–91)
- Spouse: Sheila M. Conant
- Education: University of Vermont (BA); University of Chicago (MA, PhD)
- Occupation: Writer; researcher; academic

Ralph Wendell Conant (September 7, 1926 – 2017) was an American writer and researcher in the areas of social policy, metropolitan governance, and regional planning. Conant is also the former president of Shimer College and Unity College.

== Early life and education ==
Ralph Wendell Conant was born on September 7, 1926.

He holds a BA degree from the University of Vermont and PhD and a MA degree from the University of Chicago, where he studied public administration, urban politics and political philosophy.

== Career ==
He served as faculty at several institutions and as a staff member at advocacy groups and research groups.

From 1975 to 1978, he was president of Shimer College. From 1978–1980, he was president of Unity College in Maine.

He has served on the faculty of Michigan State University (1956–1957); staff, National Municipal (Civic) League (1957–1959); Lecturer, Graduate School of Public Administration, New York University, 1958–1959; Executive Director, Citizens for Michigan (1959–1960); faculty, University of Denver (1960–1961); as Assistant Director, Joint Center for Urban Studies, MIT-Harvard (1961–1967); Lecturer, Graduate School of Social Work, Boston College, 1965–1967; Director of Research, New England Economic Research Foundation, 1968–1969; Associate Director, Lemberg Center for the Study of Violence, Brandeis University (1967–1969). Lecturer, Southern Police Institute, Louisville, KY (annually), 1970–1974.

He was founding President, Southwest Center for Urban Research, Houston and Professor of Urban Design, Rice University School of Architecture, Professor of Political Science, University of Houston, Texas Southern University, Baylor College of Medicine, and University of Texas School of Public Health (1969–1975).

He was a citizen member of the New England Regional Commission on Comprehensive Health Planning. Since 1980, he has served as a member of the Maine State Board of Education (1984–89), as special assistant to the president at Mercy College (1987–89), a Senior Fellow at the Phelps-Stokes Fund in Washington, DC. Executive Director, Maine Common Cause. He ran twice for the US Congress in Maine’s First Congressional District, 1984 and 1986 and in 1990 for the State Senate in his home district.

He was president of the Asgard Foundation; an author, and president of Conant Associates.

== Personal life and death ==
He was married to Sheila M. Conant and lived in Trinidad, California. He owned a farm in Maine dating to the family settlement in 1771 before dying in 2017.

== Publications ==
=== Books ===
- The Public Library and the City (MIT Press, 1965)
- The State’s Biggest Business: Local and Regional Problems (Connecticut Commission, 1967)
- The Politics of Community Health (Public Affairs Press, 1968)
- Problems of Research in Community Violence (with Molly Apple Levin, Praeger, 1969)
- The Prospects for Revolution (Harper & Row, 1971)
- The Metropolitan Library (MIT Press, 1972)
- Urban Perspectives: Politics and Policies (with Alan Shank, Holbrook Press, 1975)
- The Conant Report: A Study of the Education of Librarians (MIT Press, 1980)
- Cutting Loose: From Employee to Entrepreneur: Making the Transition (with Thomas A. Easton, Probus Publishing Company, 1985)
- Using Consultants (with Thomas A. Easton, Probus Publishing Company, 1986)
- Private Means Public Ends: Private Business in Social Service Delivery (with Barry J. Carroll and Thomas A. Easton, Praeger, 1987)
- Toward a More Perfect Union: The Governance of Metropolitan America (with Daniel J. Myers, 1st ed. 2002; 2nd ed. 2006, Chandler & Sharp)
- City of Destiny: Denver in the Making (with Maxine Kurtz, Chandler & Sharp, 2008)

=== Monographs ===
- The Politics of Regional Planning (Greater Hartford Chamber of Commerce Town Meeting for Tomorrow, 1965)
- Bibliography of Social Scientific Studies of the Fluoridation Controversy (Journal of Oral Therapeutics and Pharmacology, November 1966)
- The Nature of Civil Protest (Lemberg Center for the Study of Violence, Brandeis University, 1969)
- Public School Finance: Toward a More Level Playing Field for Our Youth (Phelps-Stokes Fund, 1993)

=== Government and commissioned studies ===
- The Effectiveness of Metropolitan Planning (with Charles Haar et al., prepared for the United States Senate Subcommittee on Government Operations, 1964)

=== Contributions to other works ===
- Foreword to Invisible Cage, A Memoir by Maxine Kurtz (Chandler & Sharp, 2006)

=== Unpublished manuscripts ===
- The Politics of Metropolitan Consolidation in a Michigan Area (doctoral dissertation, University of Chicago, 1960)
- Metropolitan Problems and Politics: A Seminar (edited papers, University of Denver, 1962)
- An Evaluation of Fair Housing, Incorporated (Boston, Massachusetts, 1966)
- The Political Aspects of Health Planning in Berkshire County (MA): A Report to the Berkshire County Health Planning Association (1969)
- The Professional, Business, and Economic Service Needs of the Residents of the Suburban Library System (Chicago, 1973)
