= Frances Shimer =

American educator (1826–1901)

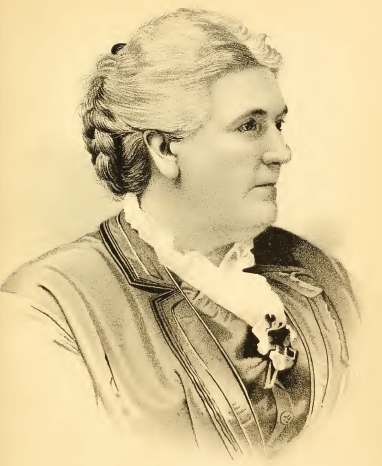
Frances Shimer in her early 50s

Frances Shimer (August 21, 1826 – November 10, 1901), born Frances Ann Wood, was an American educator. She was the founder of the Mount Carroll Seminary, which later became Shimer College, in Mount Carroll, Illinois. She was also the sole proprietor of the school from 1870 to her retirement in 1896.

== Early life ==
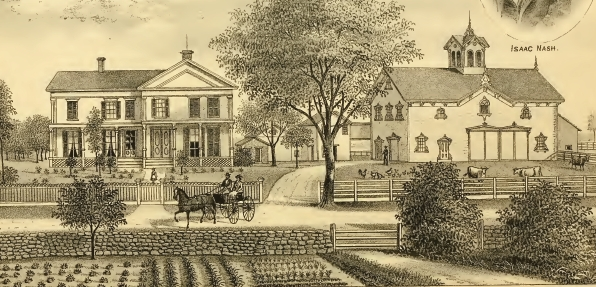
The Isaac Nash residence in Milton, New York, where Frances Wood lived for much of her youth

Frances Shimer was born as Frances Ann Wood in Town of Milton, in Saratoga County, New York, on August 21, 1826. She was the youngest of the four children of Rebecca Bryan and Jesse Wood. Her mother died of tuberculosis when Shimer was 10, and thereafter she was raised by her older sister.

Shimer was remembered as a highly acute student: "the mere consciousness of something unknown was sufficient incentive to arouse ambition to acquire." She began school near her parents' house at the age of two and half, quickly learning to read. At the age of six, she spent all of her saved allowance to buy a copy of Isaac Watts' The Improvement of the Mind from an itinerant bookseller. At the age of seven, she was briefly sent to a boarding school, but suffered from homesickness.

She was fond of pets, and also began to experiment with horticulture from a young age. Because she was much younger than the other children, she was allowed to spend her time freely around the farm, and developed a reputation as a skilled animal trainer. A memorial essay recalls that "from childhood she was considered very skilful in managing spirited horses."

Her mother died of tuberculosis when Frances was ten, and she was subsequently looked after by her sister Caroline, who was 21 years older. Shortly thereafter, Caroline married Isaac Nash, a prosperous local farmer. Frances was then sent to the Stillwater Academy, a coeducational school in Stillwater, New York. At the age of twelve, however, Frances returned home to attend to the Wood family farm and care for her father.

== New York teaching career ==
Shimer took up teaching in local Saratoga County schools at the age of fourteen. She also continued to care for her father's farm until it was sold. After the sale of the farm, she and her father lived at the spacious Nash residence. While living with the Nashes, Shimer first made the acquaintance of Cinderella Gregory, who boarded at the Nash house while teaching in the district.

Throughout these early teaching years, Shimer saved her income from teaching and farming to pay for her future education. Influenced by her mother's early death, Shimer wished to become a physician, but was unable to find any medical school that would admit women. She therefore sought further education as a teacher.

The movement toward state-supported normal schools had begun in New England in 1839, and the New York state legislature established the New York State Normal School in Albany in 1844. Shimer entered the state normal school in 1848, having been granted a full scholarship on the recommendation of her local superintendent. She graduated in 1849, having completed the two-year course in one year so that she could graduate in the same class as Cinderella Gregory. Shimer and Gregory continued to teach at schools in New York, but were unable to find steady positions due to the oversupply of teachers in the East. Shimer also began to suffer from tuberculosis, and sought a change of climate. She and Gregory therefore corresponded with the citizens in a number of Midwestern towns, looking for a teaching position.^{2003}

A business acquaintance of Isaac Nash, the attorney John Wilson, was at this time seeking to establish a seminary in the small frontier town of Mount Carroll, Illinois. After some correspondence, Shimer and Cinderella Gregory left New York together for Mount Carroll in 1853, traveling by the Great Lakes to Illinois and by wagon the rest of the way. A charter for the seminary had been granted by the legislature in 1852, but when Shimer and Gregory arrived, there was no building and no students. On May 11, 1853, they began teaching to a small group of mostly very young students in the Presbyterian Church.

== Co-principal of Mount Carroll Seminary, 1853–1870 ==
From 1853 to 1870, Shimer operated the Mount Carroll Seminary as a partnership with Cinderella Gregory, who served as the chief academic officer while Shimer handled finances and other non-academic operations. Shimer and Gregory purchased the school from the discouraged incorporators in 1855, when it still occupied only a single building. The subsequent expansion of the seminary to a 25-acre campus with four connected buildings and numerous outbuildings was attributed largely to Shimer's industry and careful management of finances.

In 1857, a major expansion of the school was planned, but the Panic of 1857 intervened.

In December 1857, she married local naturalist Henry Shimer. Henry subsequently traveled to Chicago to study medicine, obtaining his MD from Chicago Medical College in 1866, and taught classes at the seminary. He was also a noted entomologist. The Shimers lived in separate quarters throughout their marriage.

== Principal of Mount Carroll Seminary, 1870–1896 ==
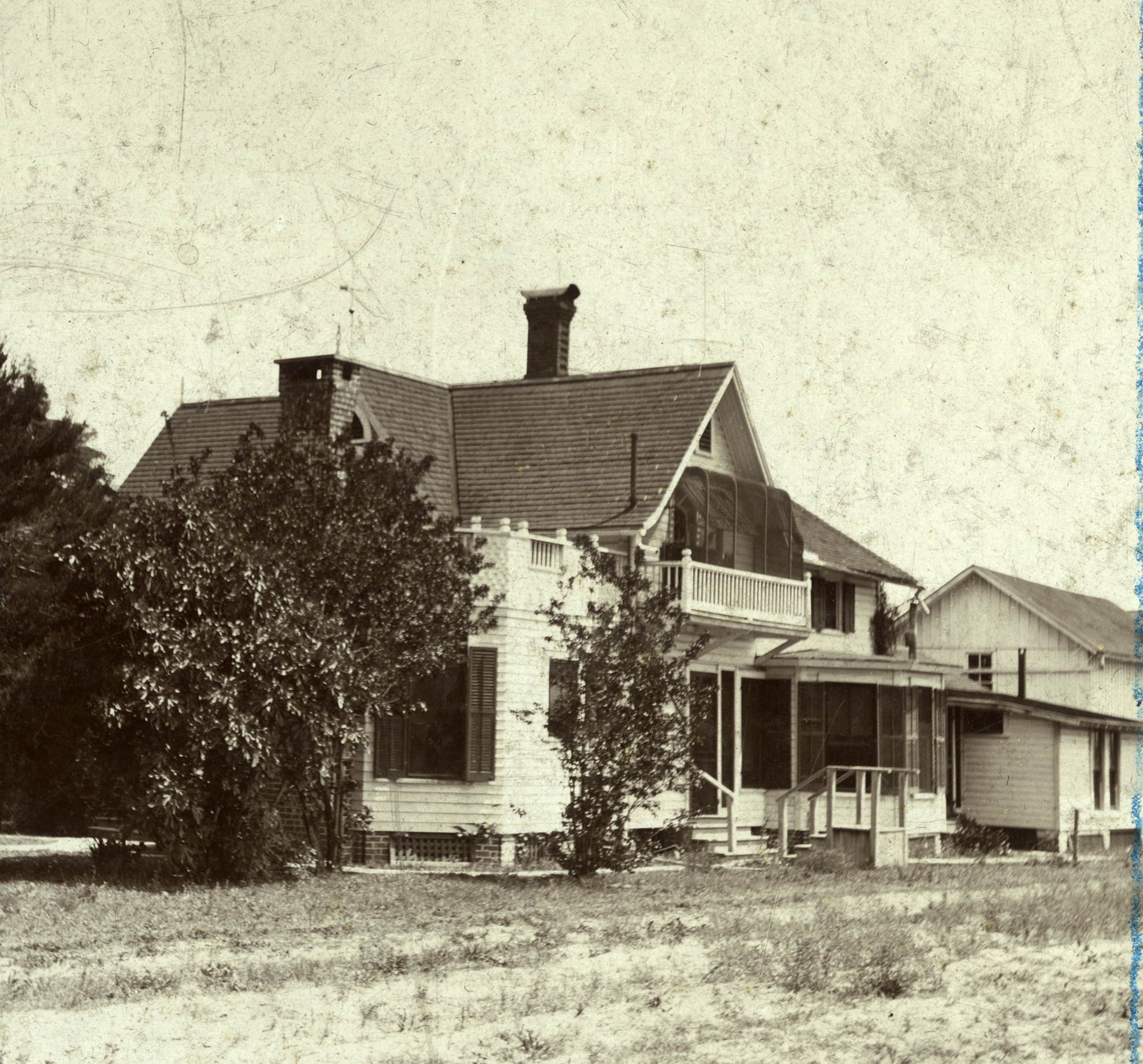
Picture from the 1890s of the home of Frances Shimer in DeLand, Florida. Built in 1885 and still standing, this is one of DeLand's oldest homes.

In 1870, a number of significant events occurred. Gregory left the school to marry, and sold her interest in the seminary to Shimer. Adelia Joy was brought on to replace Gregory administratively, but the school remained Shimer's sole property until she relinquished control in 1896.

Beginning in the 1880s, Shimer began to spend the winters in DeLand, Florida, where she established a large and profitable orange plantation. As with the previous farm operations closer to Mount Carroll, a significant portion of the orchard's harvest was shipped to the Seminary to provide food for students.

In 1895, Shimer's husband Henry Shimer committed suicide, either by hanging or gunshot. His death occurred five days after he had drawn up a new will leaving his wife with his entire fortune of approximately $200,000, and his surviving sister and mother with nothing. The will was successfully contested by the Shimer family, in a trial that drew hundreds of spectators each day.

In 1896, Frances Shimer arranged to transfer control of the Mount Carroll Seminary to a Board of Trustees under an affiliation with the University of Chicago. She subsequently retired to Florida and took up orange-growing. However, the orange groves were destroyed in a frost.

== Final years, 1896–1901 ==
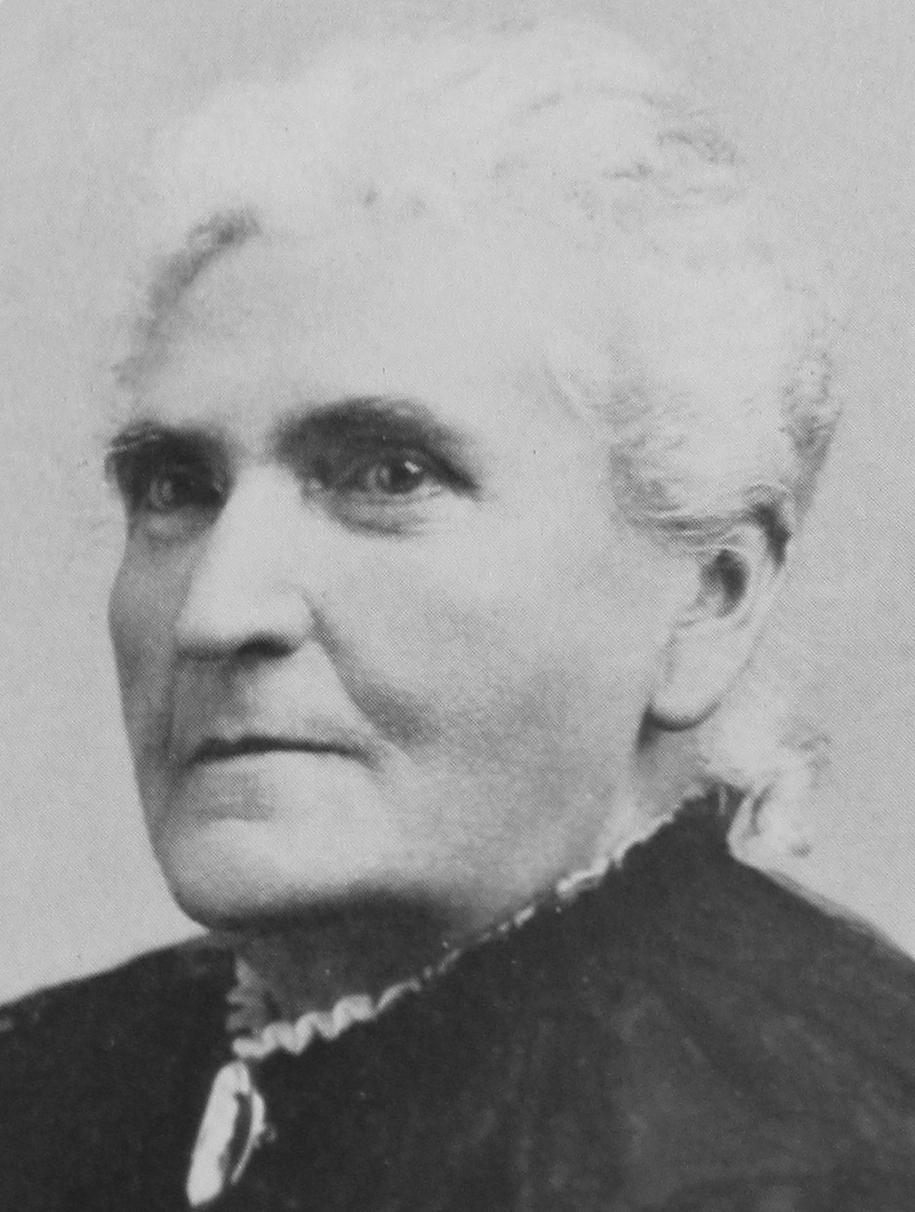
Frances Shimer, from the frontispiece of the memorial volume published upon her death

Frances Shimer died on November 10, 1901. Her body was returned to Mount Carroll for burial there. After a funeral service at the chapel of the Frances Shimer Academy, she was interred at the Oak Hill Cemetery in Mount Carroll.

== See also ==
- History of Shimer College
- List of Shimer College presidents

== Works cited ==
- Sawyer, Winona Branch (1901). "Mrs. Shimer's Life and Work" . Frances Wood Shimer, 1826–1901. Mt. Carroll, Illinois. OCLC 13863166.
- Malkmus, Doris (2003). "Frances Wood Shimer, Cindarella Gregory, and the 1853 founding of Shimer College". Journal of Illinois History. 6. Illinois Historic Preservation Agency: 195–214. ISSN 1522-0532.
