= William Craig Rice =

American academic (1955–2016)

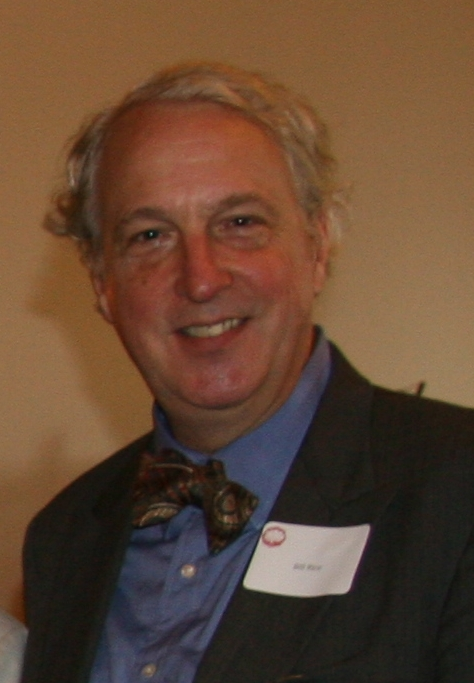
William Craig Rice in 2013

William Craig Rice (May 4, 1955 – June 20, 2016) was an American educator. He was the Director of the Division of Education Programs of the National Endowment for the Humanities.

== Career ==
Rice was born in 1955 in Washington, D.C. He received his bachelor's and master's degrees at the University of Virginia, where his studies focused on English and American literature. He later earned an M.F.A. and a doctorate at the University of Michigan, Ann Arbor, where he won a Hopwood Writing Award and the Brubacher Prize in the History of Education. His publications include: Public Discourse & Academic Inquiry, a study in the sociology of knowledge; Characteristics of Exemplary Schools; a special edited volume of the Harvard Review commemorating Seamus Heaney's Nobel Prize; and more than fifty articles, reviews, essays, stories, and poems in such periodicals as The New Criterion, Policy Review, The Sewanee Review, The Washington Post, and The Common Review: The Magazine of the Great Books Foundation. He has also worked as an Alfa Romeo mechanic, a warden at the Adirondack Mountain Reserve, and the manager of an antiques shop.

After his studies at the University of Virginia, he taught at the Webb School in Bell Buckle, Tennessee, at Temple University, and at the University of Pennsylvania; and then undertook graduate studies at the University of Michigan. From 1992 to 2001, he taught expository writing in the Faculty of Arts and Sciences at Harvard University, where he also edited non-fiction for the Harvard Review. While at Harvard he became involved in education reform as a consultant to the Massachusetts Board of Education, helping to reshape curriculum frameworks and assessment in English Language Arts. He has been a Visiting Fellow at Johns Hopkins University's Paul H. Nitze School of Advanced International Studies, and at the American Enterprise Institute; an Ella Baker Fellow at Antioch New England Graduate School; a consultant to the John Templeton Foundation; and from 2001 to 2004 a staff member at the American Academy for Liberal Education, where he created new K-12 programs. Furthermore, he has been a consultant to the American Board for Certification of Teacher Excellence, which offers an alternative route into the K-12 classroom for liberal arts college graduates and career-switching professionals, and also to the education reform organization Achieve, which has launched the American Diploma Project to raise academic expectations in American high schools.

In 2004 he was appointed the President of Shimer College, where he also served as a professor of English, Education, and the Humanities. Amid controversy, the Shimer College Board of Trustees announced in January 2006 that at his urging it had accepted an invitation to move the school to the Illinois Institute of Technology campus on the south side of Chicago. The move was completed in August of the same year. In August 2007 he left Shimer in order to accept a position with the NEH. He also served as a Visitor of Ralston College. On June 20, 2016, he died of a heart attack while traveling for an NEH site visit in Philadelphia.

== Family ==
His paternal grandfather was John Andrew Rice, the founder of Black Mountain College. He collaborated with Mark Bauerlein in editing the republication of John Andrew Rice's suppressed autobiography, I Came Out of the Eighteenth Century (1942), in the Southern Classics Series of the University of South Carolina Press (2014).
