= American Academy for Liberal Education =

- Formation: 1992
- Type: Nonprofit
- Location: Alexandria, Virginia
- President: Charles E. Butterworth
- Website: www.aale.org

The American Academy for Liberal Education (AALE) is a United States–based educational accreditation organization with a focus on fostering liberal arts education, both in higher education and in earlier schooling.

AALE does not currently have U.S. Department of Education recognition as a higher education accreditor.

== History ==
AALE was formed in 1992 with the stated purpose of "supporting and recognizing excellence in undergraduate liberal arts teaching and learning through accreditation." Founders included Jacques Barzun, retired philosophy professor from Columbia University, E.O. Wilson of Harvard University, historian Elizabeth Fox-Genovese of Emory University, and Lynne Cheney, then-chair of the National Endowment for the Humanities. Its initial focus was on undergraduate education, which Barzun said had become "confused, misdirected or not directed at all."

In July 1995, the U.S. Department of Education granted AALE official recognition as an institutional accreditor for colleges and universities. This recognition allowed AALE-accredited institutions in the United States to participate in student financial aid programs authorized under the Higher Education Act and other U.S. federal programs.

In December 2006, the U.S. Department of Education suspended AALE's authority to accredit new institutions and programs. This restriction was lifted in December 2007. In the ruling that lifted the restrictions for a period of three years (expiring in December, 2010), Education Secretary Margaret Spellings wrote of "continued concerns stemming from AALE's being cited consistently since 2001 for either not having clear standards with respect to measuring student outcomes or not collecting and reviewing data on how institutions it accredits measures student outcomes."

In November 2010, AALE voluntarily withdrew its request for renewal of U.S. Department of Education recognition as a higher education accreditor. For institutions accredited by AALE in 2010 or earlier, accreditation remained valid through July 1, 2012, for purposes of federal government financial aid to students under Title IV of the Higher Education Act.

== Accreditation ==
AALE provides two types of accreditation for higher education institutions that offer general education programs in the liberal arts. It provides institutional accreditation for universities and colleges that want AALE to be their sole accreditor and it provides program accreditation for liberal arts programs within higher education institutions that are institutionally accredited by another accreditor. AALE accreditation activities are not limited to the United States; the organization works with institutions and programs worldwide that emphasize liberal education and the liberal arts.

As of June 2026, AALE accredited ten K–12 charter schools in Washington, DC. It is also the accreditor for approximately 20 programs at institutions within the United States and one at the America University of Kuwait. The vast majority of AALE-accredited higher education programs follow a "great books" approach to the curriculum.

== Leadership ==
Since January 2011, AALE has been led by acting president Charles E. Butterworth, an emeritus professor of politics and government at the University of Maryland.

== See also ==
- Higher education accreditation in the United States
- List of recognized accreditation associations of higher learning
- Standards-based education reform
