= Henry Shimer =

American entomologist

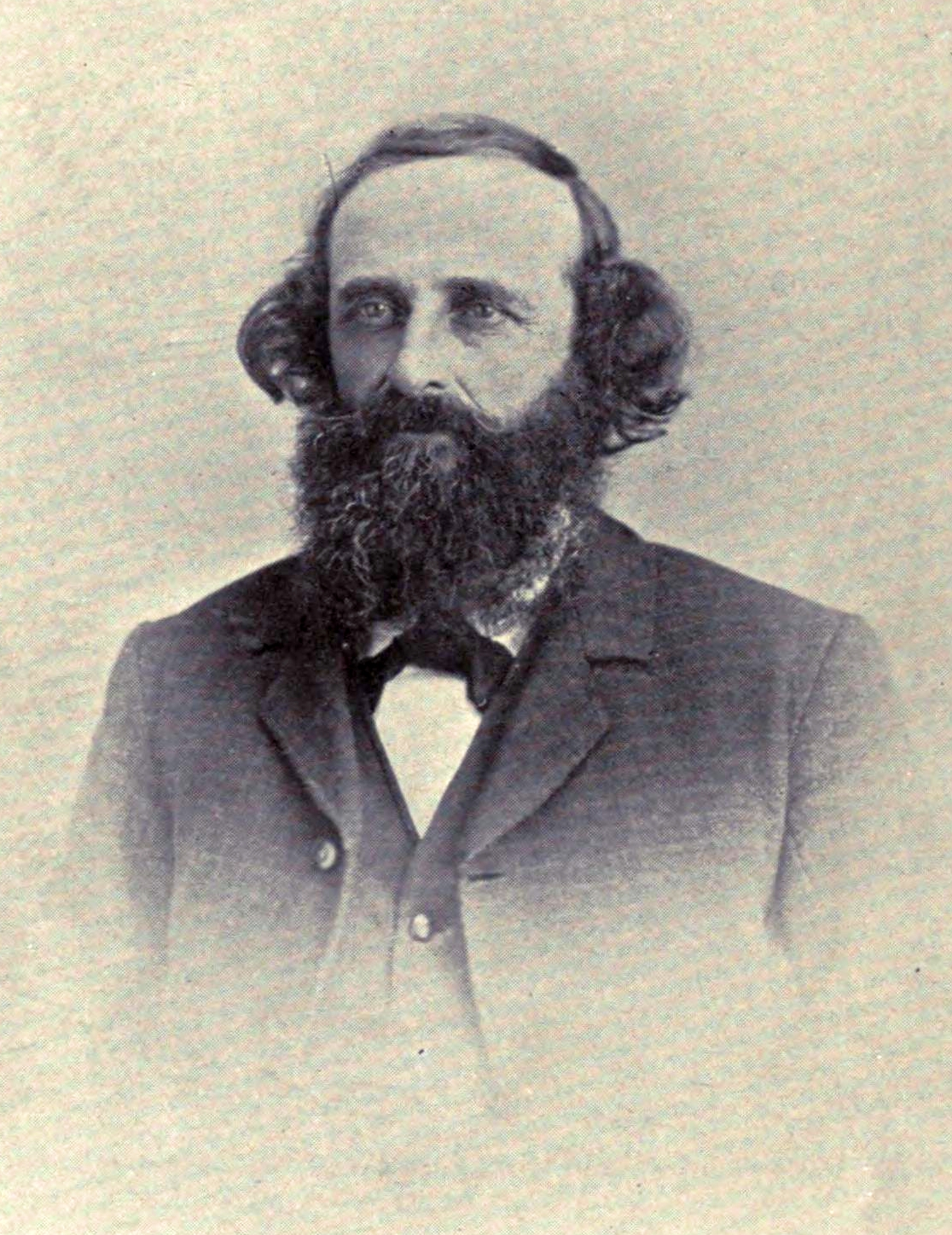
Henry Shimer

Henry Shimer (September 21, 1828 – July 28, 1895) was a naturalist and physician in Mount Carroll, Illinois. He was also a teacher at the Mount Carroll Seminary, which later became Shimer College; he was the husband of the seminary's founder, Frances Shimer.

On July 28, 1895, Shimer committed suicide, either with a revolver or by hanging. He had amended his will five days previously to leave his entire fortune to his wife, leaving his mother and sister destitute.

== Biography ==
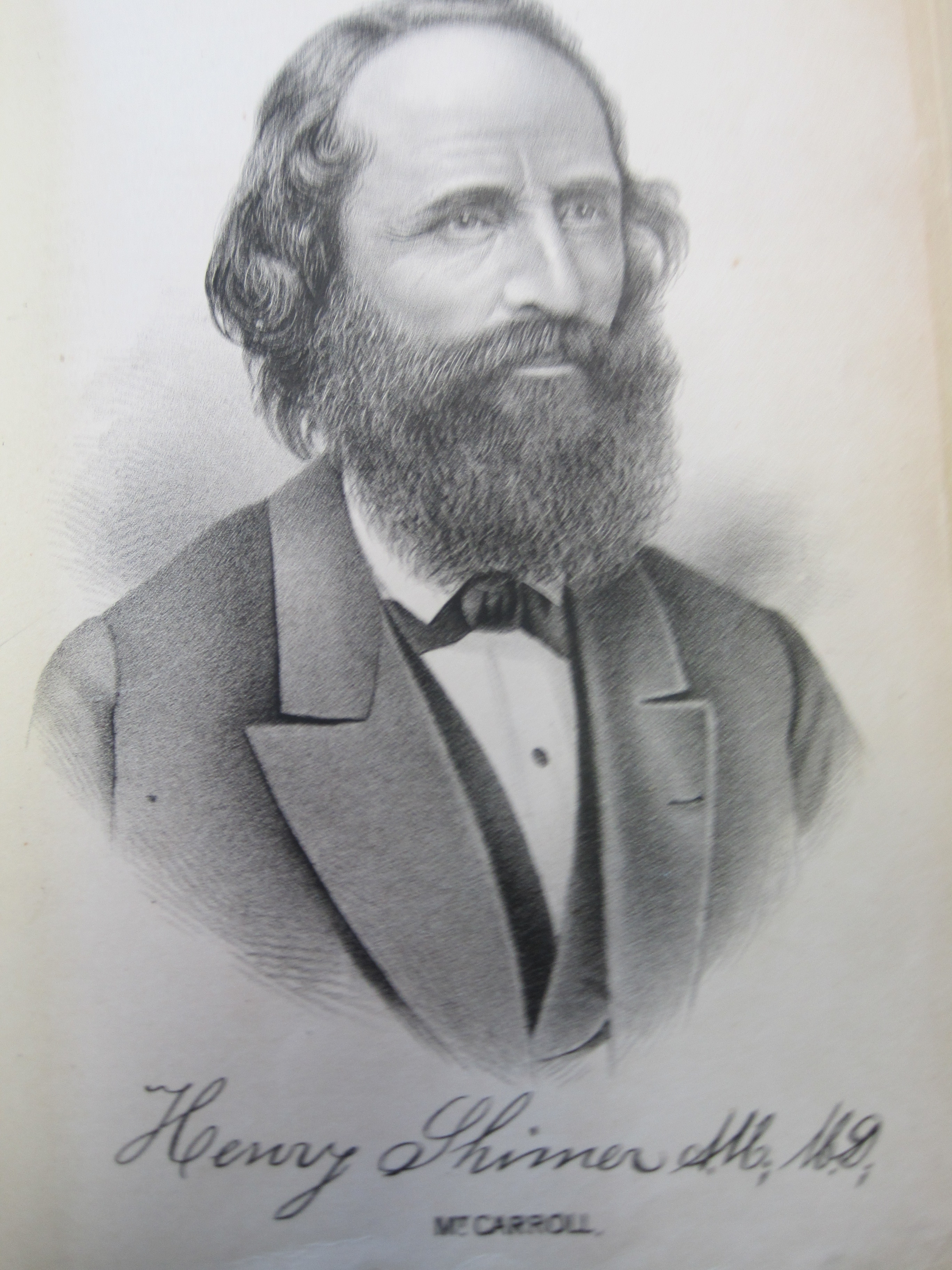

=== Early life ===
Shimer was born on September 21, 1828, in West Vincent Township, Pennsylvania. He worked as a stone mason in his youth and took up teaching at the age of 18.

In March 1854, Shimer left Pennsylvania and traveled west to Mount Carroll, Illinois after a failed love affair. He may have done work on the construction or expansion of the Mount Carroll Seminary, for which the owners were unable to pay him.

=== Marriage ===
On December 22, 1857, Shimer and Frances Ann Wood, the co-principal of the Mount Carroll Seminary, were married. Frances "Frank" was a trans-gender woman who had earlier had a relationship with Cinderella Gregory which continued after her marriage. The marriage with Shimer was widely reputed to be a marriage of convenience. Shortly after the marriage, Shimer went to study medicine and when he returned they had separate rooms.

=== Vocations ===
Shimer subsequently left for Chicago to study medicine. He graduated from the Chicago Medical College on March 1, 1866. Shimer also obtained a Master of Arts from the University of Chicago by examination.

He was a prolific entomologist and published widely, describing a number of novel species and genera. He also served for a time as the assistant State Entomologist of Illinois. In addition, he was an expert taxidermist, and had a collection of over 1000 mounted birds. His collections were provided to the seminary for educational purposes.

In the 1880s, Shimer became wealthy by speculating on real estate in Iowa, allegedly inspired by a dream. At the time of his death his estate was worth approximately $200,000.

=== Travels ===
Shimer traveled widely within the United States, stopping along the way to work as a stone mason. He sometimes covered more than a thousand miles on foot. He is said to have worn boots at all times.

=== Death ===
On July 28, 1895, Henry Shimer committed suicide, he was found hanging with a revolver nearby with one chamber having been fired. He had amended his will five days previously to leave his entire fortune to his wife, leaving his mother and sister destitute. In a highly publicized trial, the will was successfully contested.

== Published works ==
- 1865, "Description of the Imago and Larva of a New Species of Chrysopa", Proceedings of the Entomological Society of Philadelphia
- 1867, "Description of a New Species of Aleyrodes", Transactions of the American Entomological Society
- 1867, "Description of a New Species of Cecidomyia", Transactions of the American Entomological Society
- 1867, "On a New Genus of Aphidae", Transactions of the American Entomological Society
- 1867, "Notes on the Apple Bark Louse (Lepidosaphes conchiformis), with a Description of a supposed new Acarus"
- 1867, "Notes on Micropus (Lygarus) leucopterus Say ('The chinch bug')", Proceedings of the Academy of Natural Sciences of Philadelphia
- 1867, "Additional Note on the Chinch-Bug", Proceedings of the Academy of Natural Sciences of Philadelphia
- 1867, "On a new genus in Homoptera (Section Monomera)", Proceedings of the Academy of Natural Sciences of Philadelphia
- 1868, "Descriptions of two Acarians bred from White Maple", Transactions of the American Entomological Society
- 1868, "Notes on Chermes pinicorticis (white pine louse)", Transactions of the American Entomological Society
- 1868, "A Summer's Study of the Hickory Galls, with Descriptions of supposed New Species bred therefrom", Transactions of the American Entomological Society
- 1868, "The Wavy-Striped Flea Beetle", The American Naturalist
- 1869, "Insects Injurious to the Potato", The American Naturalist
- 1872, "Additional Notes on the Striped Squash Beetle", The American Naturalist
- 1891, "Consciousness in Protoplasm", The Microscope
