= Raab (surname) =

Raab is a German surname. Notable people with the surname include:

- Alexander Raab (1882–1958), American-Hungarian musician
- Antoine Raab (1913–2006), French-German footballer
- Anton Raab (fl. 1738), Slovenian politician
- Antonius Raab (1897–1985), German aviator
- Ben Raab (born 1970), American writer and producer
- Bernhard Raab (born 1966), German footballer and manager
- Chris Raab (born 1980 or 1981), American television personality
- Claus Raab (1943–2012), German musicologist
- Diana Raab (born 1954), American poet
- Dominic Raab (2021–2022, 2022–2023), Deputy Prime Minister of the United Kingdom
- Doris Raab (1851–1933), German etcher and engraver
- Eleonore von Raab (1755 – c. 1811), Austrian collector of minerals
- Esther Raab (1894–1981) (1894–1981), Israeli poet
- Frank Raab (1921–2016), American naval officer and insurance executive
- Franz Anton von Raab (1722–1783), Austrian agrarian reformer
- George Raab (born 1948), Canadian artist
- George Raab (1866–1943), American painter from Wisconsin
- Herbert Raab (born 1969), Austrian software engineer and amateur astronomer
- Heike Raab (born 1965), German politician
- Hugo Raab (1831–1881), Swedish Army officer
- Ignác Raab (1715–1787), Czech painter and Jesuit brother
- Jared Raab (fl. 21st c.), Canadian writer and filmmaker
- Jennifer Raab (fl. 21st c.), American academic
- Johann Leonhard Raab (1825–1899) (1825–1899), German printmaker & painter
- Julius Raab (1891–1964), Austrian politician
- Jürgen Raab (born 1958), German footballer
- Kurt Raab (1941–1988), West German stage and film actor
- Lawrence Raab (born 1946), American poet
- Leopold Friedrich Raab (1721–after 1786), German violinist and composer
- Marc Raab (born 1969), American football player
- Max Raab (1926–2008), American film producer
- Michael Raab (born 1982), American butterfly swimmer
- Ondřej Raab (born 1973), Czech slalom canoeist
- Rachel Raab (born 1981), American artist
- Scott Raab (born 1952), American journalist
- Selwyn Raab (1934–2025), American journalist, author, and investigative reporter
- Simon Raab (born 1952), American painter
- Stefan Raab (born 1966), German entertainer
- Susan Raab Simonson (1969–2006), American actress
- Susana Raab (fl. 21st c.), American fine art and documentary photographer
- Susanne Raab (born 1984), Austrian politician
- Uwe Raab (born 1962), German cyclist
- William von Raab (1942–2019), American attorney
