= National Register of Historic Places listings in Carroll County, Illinois =

Location of Carroll County in Illinois

This is a list of the National Register of Historic Places listings in Carroll County, Illinois.

This is intended to be a complete list of the properties and districts on the National Register of Historic Places in Carroll County, Illinois, United States. Latitude and longitude coordinates are provided for many National Register properties and districts; these locations may be seen together in a map.

There are 7 properties and districts listed on the National Register in the county.

This National Park Service list is complete through NPS recent listings posted December 12, 2025.

== Current listings ==
	Name on the Register	Image	Date listed	Location	City or town	Description
1	Carroll County Courthouse	Carroll County Courthouse	November 26, 1973 (#73000692)	Courthouse Sq. 42°06′02″N 89°58′42″W	Mount Carroll	
2	Charles Franks House	Charles Franks House	May 20, 1998 (#98000459)	34431 U.S. Route 52; 42°03′47″N 89°41′51″W	Lanark	
3	Nathaniel Halderman House	Nathaniel Halderman House	November 24, 1980 (#80001339)	728 E. Washington St. 42°05′52″N 89°58′18″W	Mount Carroll	
4	Caroline Mark House	Caroline Mark House	August 11, 1983 (#83000303)	222 E. Lincoln St. 42°06′15″N 89°58′28″W	Mount Carroll	
5	Mount Carroll Historic District	Mount Carroll Historic District	November 26, 1980 (#80001340)	Illinois Routes 64 and 78; 42°05′31″N 89°58′49″W	Mount Carroll	
6	Savanna-Sabula Bridge	Savanna-Sabula Bridge	August 27, 1999 (#99001033)	U.S. Route 52/Iowa Highway 64 over the Mississippi River; 42°06′15″N 90°09′40″W	Savanna	Extends into Jackson County, Iowa
7	Joseph Steffens House	Joseph Steffens House	April 10, 1985 (#85000771)	Off of Elkhorn Rd. 41°57′59″N 89°43′03″W	Milledgeville	

== See also ==
- List of National Historic Landmarks in Illinois
- National Register of Historic Places listings in Illinois
