= Mount Carroll Historic District =

Historic district in Illinois, United States

- U.S. National Register of Historic Places
- U.S. Historic district
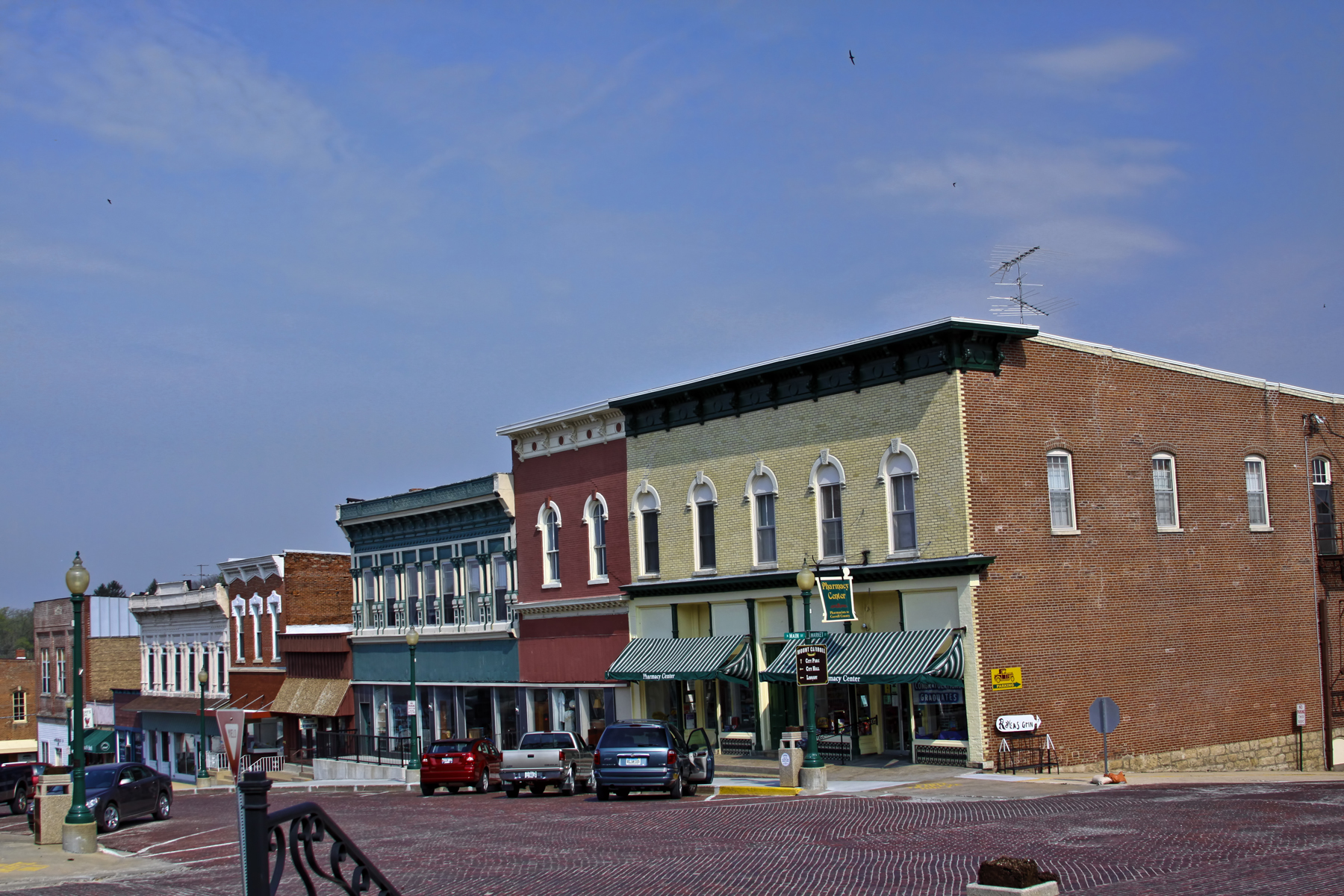
- Market Street in downtown Mount Carroll.

- Location within Illinois Location within the United States
- Location: Mount Carroll, Carroll County, Illinois, USA
- Coordinates: 42°05′31″N 89°58′49″W
- Area: 118 acres (48 ha)
- Built: c. 1850-1924
- Architect: Various
- NRHP reference No.: 80001340
- Added to NRHP: November 24, 1980

The Mount Carroll Historic District is a designated historic district in the Carroll County, Illinois town of Mount Carroll, which is the county seat. The district is listed on the National Register of Historic Places (NRHP), and is one of a total of six sites in the county included on the Register.

The district was added to the NRHP in 1980. One building within the district, the Carroll County Courthouse, had already been added to the NRHP in 1973.

The District is divided into three major sections: the traditional downtown of Mount Carroll, including the courthouse, library and business district; a residential area to the south of the downtown; and further south, the historic original campus of Chicago's Shimer College, now occupied by the Campbell Center for Historic Preservation Studies. The great majority of the buildings in the first two sections date from before 1900. Due to a fire that destroyed the original Mount Carroll Seminary campus in 1906, all of the Shimer campus buildings are from the 20th century, but most date from before 1930.

NRHP-listed structures that are located within Mount Carroll but not included in the district are the Caroline Mark House and Nathaniel Halderman House.

== Buildings and structures ==
The District's boundaries include a total of 272 buildings and structures, of which 81 have been assessed to have particular architectural and historic significance.

Listing number	Name	Street address	Year built	Architect	Notes
1	Commercial block	207-209 W. Market	Unknown		
2	Commercial block	408 N. Carroll	Unknown		
3	A.N. Lichty Building	106 W. Market	1865		
4	Samuel J. Campbell Building	108-112 W. Market	1865		
5	Galena Street Bridge		Unknown	Wrought Iron Bridge Company.	
6	Carroll County Courthouse	Market & Main	1858	William B. Olmsted & Peter A. Nicholson	
7	Glenview Hotel	Market & Clay	1886		
8	Robert M.A. Hawk Residence	115 N. Clay	approx. 1867		Hawk was the only sitting US representative to ever reside in Carroll County.
9	Uriah Green Residence	105 N. Clay	1873		
10	S.J. Campbell Sr. Residence II	202 N. Main	1875		
11	B.H. and James S. Hallett Residence	209/211 S. Main	1856		
12	Nelson Rinedollar Residence	306 S. Main	1877		
13	Hiram Colehour Residence	316 S. Main	1860		
14	John M. Stowell Residence	413 S. Main	1860		
15	John G. Blake Residence	210 E. Broadway	1861		
16	Owen P. Miles Residence II	107 W. Broadway	1873		
17	S.J. Campbell II Residence	111 W. Broadway	1925	Carroll A. Klein	
18	Philander Seymour Residence	512 S. College	1856		
19	Former campus of Shimer College (14 buildings)	from Seminary St. south between Clay & Jackson	1903-1958	Various	
20	Judge James Shaw Residence	415 S. Clay	1889	Joseph Lyman Silsbee	James Shaw was a prominent local politician, serving three terms in the Illinois General Assembly including one as Speaker of the House
21	Jesse M. Shirk	304 E. Broadway	1867		
22	Ansel Bailey Residence	402 S. Clay	1873		
23	David Emmert House	Clay & State	1842		David Emmert was co-founder and earliest settler of Mount Carroll
24	Commercial block	101 W. Market	Unknown		
25	Commercial block	105 W. Market	Unknown		
26	Commercial block	113 W. Market	Unknown		
27	Commercial block	318 N. Main	Unknown		
28	Commercial block	100-102 W. Market	Unknown		
29	Commercial block	308 N. Main	Unknown		
30	George A. Stanton Building	310 N. Main	1896		
31	Commercial block	314-316 N. Main	Unknown thumb		
32	Carnegie Library	Main & Rapp	1907		
33	Frank W. Nohe block	115 W. Market	Unknown		
34	J.H. Bushy Plats	207-217 E. Market	1901		
35	Commercial block	114 W. Market	Unknown		
36	Charles Philips Block	116-118 W. Market	1871		
37	William Miller block	120 W. Market	1871		William T. Miller was a representative in the Illinois legislature
38	SS. John and Catherine Church	714 S. Jackson	Unknown		
39	Edwin McAffee Residence	504 S. College	1861		
40	B.L. Shirk Residence	516 S. College	1862		
41	A.B. Adams Residence	505 S. College	1894		
42	Residence	611 S. Clay	Unknown		
43	Nathaniel H. Melendy Residence	401 S. Main	1871		
44	Harvey B. Woods Residence	504 S. Lester	1902		
45	John F. Hess Residence	102 W. Broadway	a. 1855		
46	George Rea Residence	Broadway & Clay	1872		
47	John W. Squires Residence	501 S. West	1902		
48	Oliver Swartz Residence	212 E. State Rd.	1858		
49	S.B. Emmons Residence	314 S. Clay	1870		
50	James O'Brien Residence	302 S. Clay	1856		
51	John H. Lafferty Residence	311 S. Clay	1887		
52	Hannah Colehour Residence	309 S. Clay	1854		
53	Joseph Ogden Residence	210 S. Clay	1873		
54	Residence	209 S. Clay	Unknown		
55	Robert Campbell Residence	208 S. Main	1888		
56	Emanuel Feaser Residence	211 S. Main	1856		
57	John Nycum Residence	105 S. Clay	1858		
58	Daniel Palmer Residence	107 S. Main	1873		
59	David Nelson Residence	101 S. Main	1859		
60	John Christian Residence	108 N. Main	1856		
61	Nathan Jacobs Residence	102 N. Main	1856		
62	Community House	101 N. Main	1860		
63	William Halderman Residence	109 N. Main	1855		
64	Residence	205 N. Main	Unknown		
65	S.H. Eby Residence	106 N. Clay	1864		
66	Dr. D.M. Greeley Residence	111 N. Clay	1873		
67	George Emmert Residence	107 N. Clay	1873		
68	S.J. Campbell Sr. Residence I	204 N. Main	1856		
69	Mrs. Lillie J. Kinney Residence	505 S. Porter	c. 1900		
70	Reuben R. Watson Residence	508 S. Porter	1901		

=== Shimer College campus ===
The buildings of the erstwhile Shimer College campus are chiefly in the Georgian Revival style; they form a traditional college quadrangle. Two buildings that formed part of the Shimer College campus, but were built after 1960, are omitted from the Historic District: these are the Karyn Kupcinet Playhouse and the New Men's Dorm, both of which are separated from the rest of the campus by Jackson Street.

Since Shimer's departure in 1978, the campus has been occupied by the Campbell Center for Historic Preservation Studies, originally known as the "Restoration College". The buildings are used for administrative, classroom, and lodging purposes, but also serve as subject matter for the study and practice of historic preservation.

Listing number	Name	Image	Year built	Architect	Notes
19a	Sawyer House		1925	C.A. Eckstrom	President's residence
19b	Metcalf Hall		1907	C.A. Eckstrom	Main administrative building
19c	Dearborn Hall		1903		Music building
19d	Campbell Library		1925	C.A. Eckstrom	
19e	Hostetter Hall		1906	C.A. Eckstrom	Dormitory
19f	Hathaway Hall		1905	C.A. Eckstrom	Dormitory
19g	Infirmary		1913	C.A. Eckstrom	
19h	McKee Hall		1906	C.A. Eckstrom	Dormitory; named for William Parker McKee
19i	Bennett Hall		1909	C.A. Eckstrom	Dormitory
19j	Gymnasium		1928	H.A. Anderson	
19k	Tolman Hall (Science Hall)		1913	C.A. Eckstrom	
19l	Howe Hall		1957	Mittelbusher & Toutelot	Dormitory
19m	Steam Plant		1911	C.A. Eckstrom	
19n	Dezendorf Hall		1957	Mittelbusher & Toutelot	Dormitory
