= Rachel Raab =

American artist

- Born: Montreal, Quebec, Canada
- Education: Savannah College of Art and Design
- Occupations: Photographer, graphic artist
- Website: www.raabstract.com

Rachel Raab, also known as RAABstract (born 1981), is an American professional photographer and multimedia artist.

== Background ==
Raab was born to the writer Diana Raab and the painter Simon Raab, in Montreal, Canada. The family moved to Orlando, Florida when she was nine years old. After high school, she studied photography in Daytona Beach, Florida as part of the last graduating class of Daytona Beach Community College, before it merged with the University of Central Florida to become Daytona State College. The Raab family became donors to the Southeast Museum of Photography, including archival prints for the permanent collection. The top floor of the gallery is called the Rachel Raab Gallery.

Raab earned an Artist honors scholarship to study photography and graphic design at Savannah College of Art and Design and moved to Savannah in 2006. She has exhibited her work at a variety of local alternative-art venues, from Black Orchid Tattoo Gallery to Hang Fire Bar and the Jewish Community Center of Savannah. Her work has been included in media outlets and publications including The Chronicle, Murmur magazine, the South magazine, District, Takedown Magazine, Louisville Review, Skirt Magazine, Savannah Jewish News, Savannah Morning News, Connect Savannah magazine, and Do magazine.

Raab received a merit award for faces photography in 2006 from Photo District News.

== RAABstract ==
Raab is the owner of Raabstract, a graphic design, photography and vinyl lettering company. She is also the creative Director at The Soda Shop, a full-service graphic design and print firm. Raabstract started as just photography by Raab and with the foundation of The Soda Shop has returned to that focus. Raab just recently relocated to Miami Beach keeping a satellite studio and main print house in Savannah. She partners with Savannah Print Factory, a field office for 3M Specialty films, along with various graphic designers and photographers.

Raab is the Co-founder of several groups and events. 12 Inch Notes offers journals made from recycled record covers. Artport912 is an organization focused on a do-it-yourself attitude to organize, promote and showcase the art scene in Savannah. Taste, which she also organizes, is an art festival in Savannah.
