= Irene Bianucci =

Italian-American painter

- Biannuci in 1951
- Born: December 16, 1903; Lucca, Tuscany, Italy
- Died: November 20, 1988 (aged 84); Encinitas, San Diego County, California
- Other names: I. B. Soravia, Irene Bianucci-Soravia
- Occupations: artist, muralist
- Years active: 1931–1980

Irene Bianucci (December 16, 1903 – November 20, 1988) was an Italian-born American painter, who participated in the art projects for the New Deal's Section of Painting and Sculpture creating the post office mural for Mount Carroll, Illinois, as well as murals for some of Chicago's elementary schools.

== Early life ==
Irene Bianucci was born on December 16, 1903, in Lucca, Tuscany, Italy to Assunta (née Cataldi) and Amadeo Bianucci. When she was six years old, her family immigrated to the United States, first settling in Farmer City, Illinois, before moving to the nearby city of Clinton. After graduating from Clinton High School in 1922, Bianucci went on to study at Millikin University in Decatur, Illinois. In 1924, Bianucci won the Minnie Bachman Mueller prize from Millikin for exceptional ability in execution of a mural entitled "Music". She began entering her work in county fairs, winning two first-place ribbons at the Illinois State Fair in 1926 for a still life and a painting of animals. Graduating from Millikin after completion her studies, Bianucci continued her training, enrolling at the Chicago Art Institute, later that same year.

Returning to the fair competition in 1927, Bianucci won three blue ribbons and five red ribbons for her paintings at the state fair. In 1930, she was awarded the Union League Club of Chicago Art Prize for her painting, "Little Russian Girl" and then won The Louis Comfort Tiffany Foundation Fellowship to continue her studies in New York. Bianucci's painting, "La Pensierosa", was selected to be part of the Art Institute of Chicago’s 34th Annual Exhibition in 1930. The following year, she participated in a show of works by the present and former students of George Raab at the Decatur Art Institute. Bianucci's portraiture was singled out for its eye-catching qualities.

== Career ==
Beginning in 1931, Bianucci worked as a professional portraitist. Her studio was located on Dearborn Street and she participated in gallery showings in 1935 at the Chicago Art Institute and Tower Town Galleries. Glowing reviews of her works, such as "In the Storm", "Rain", and "Young Girl", appeared regularly in Eleanor Jewett's column on the arts in The Chicago Tribune in 1940.

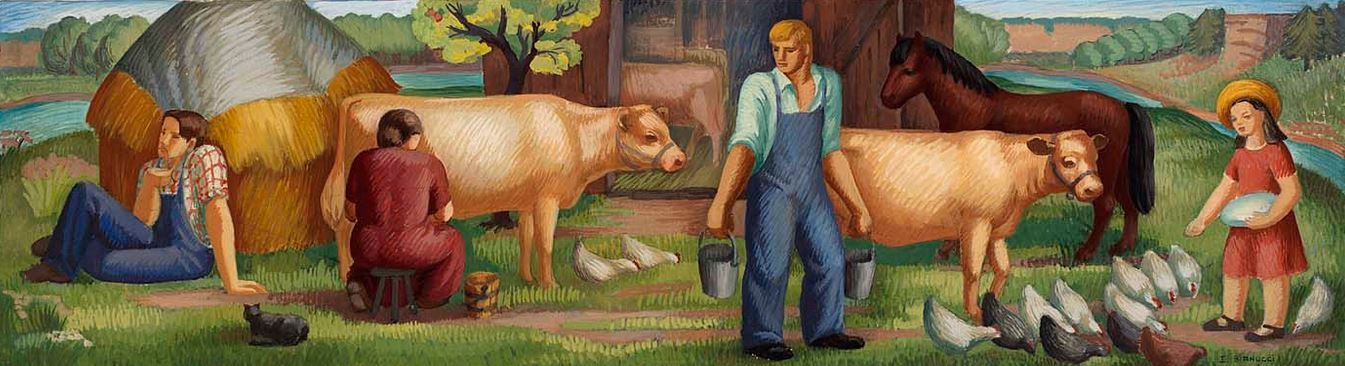
Rural Scene—Wakarusa Valley

Bianucci joined the Works Progress Administration (WPA) artists of Illinois, receiving commissions to paint murals in Chicago at the Clara Barton Elementary School and the Martin A. Ryerson Elementary School. Her two murals at Ryerson, Discovery of America and Landing of Columbus, were painted in 1940. Her mural at Clara Barton School was later destroyed. In 1941, Bianucci won the commission to paint the post office mural at Mount Carroll, Illinois. The mural, entitled Rural Scene–Wakarusa Valley, was an oil on canvas farm scene, which was restored in the late 1990s. When the federal artist's program ended in 1943, Bianucci worked as an illustrator and designer for the Container Corporation of America throughout World War II.

Bianucci married fellow artist Roy Robert Soravia, who was involved in the Op art movement and directed the Parnassus Gallery in Chicago. In 1949, the couple moved to Leucadia, Encinitas, California. Both continued to paint and showed their works at such galleries as Mandel Brother's Art Gallery of Chicago.

== Death and legacy ==
Bianucci died on November 20, 1988, in Encinitas, San Diego County, California.
