= John Philipp =

German artist (1872–1938)

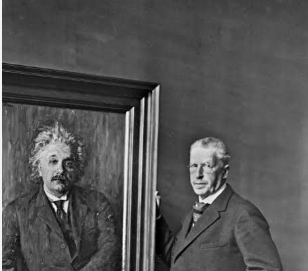
- Philipp and his painting of Einstein
- Born: 1872; Hamburg, German Empire
- Died: 1938 (aged 65–66); Hamburg, Nazi Germany
- Education: Academy of Fine Arts, Munich
- Occupations: Painter, engraver, printer
- Known for: Portraits of Albert Einstein

John Philipp (1872–1938) was a German painter, engraver, printer, and draughtsman. He is best known for his portrait of Albert Einstein.

== Biography ==
Born in Hamburg in 1872, Philipp studied at the Academy of Fine Arts, Munich under Johann Leonhard Raab and Carl von Marr from 1893 to 1898. He later moved to Berlin in 1904, where he worked for five years and befriended the German realist painter Adolph von Menzel shortly before Menzel's death in 1905. Philipp maintained a studio in Berlin and returned to Hamburg, where he died in 1938.

== Works ==
He created portraits of:

- Albert Einstein: Philipp created a well-known oversized etching of the physicist in 1929, made from life ("d'après nature").
- Auguste Rodin: He produced a signed etching portrait of the French sculptor in 1909.
- Sigmund Freud: A sketch and etching of the father of psychoanalysis date to 1913.
- Adolph von Menzel: Philipp befriended the prominent German realist painter in Berlin and created a portrait of him shortly before Menzel's death in 1905.
- Arthur Nikisch: The Hungarian conductor was another of Philipp's notable subjects.
- The Prince Regent: He also etched a portrait of the German Prince Regent (likely Luitpold of Bavaria).
- Leo Spik: An auction snippet indicates a portrait of this individual.

=== Einstein ===
Albert Einstein 'genuinely admired' John Philipp's etching of him. Family anecdotes and historical records indicate that after sitting for the artist in 1929, Einstein viewed the finished product and sent a letter expressing his "admiration" and "wonder". Einstein also agreed to hand-sign multiple impressions of the etching in pencil, adding significant value and authenticity to the artworks. A relative of physicist Otto Stern (a Nobel laureate and colleague of Einstein) displayed a signed print in his study in Berkeley, which he had rescued from the Nazis in 1933.

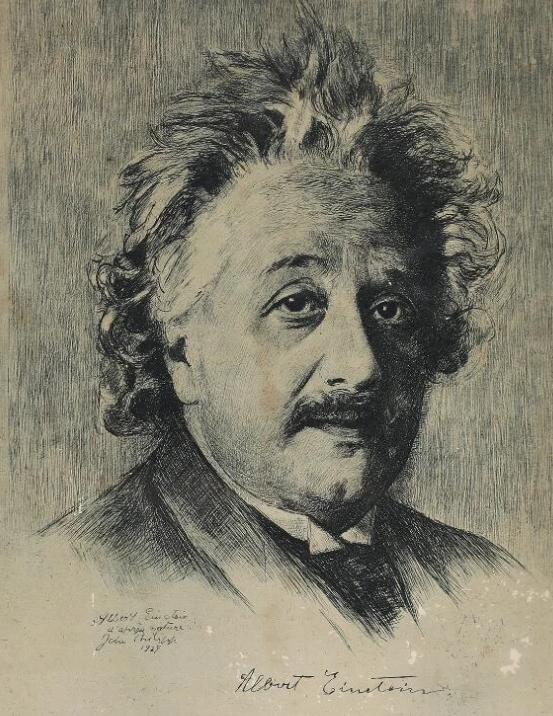
Etching 1

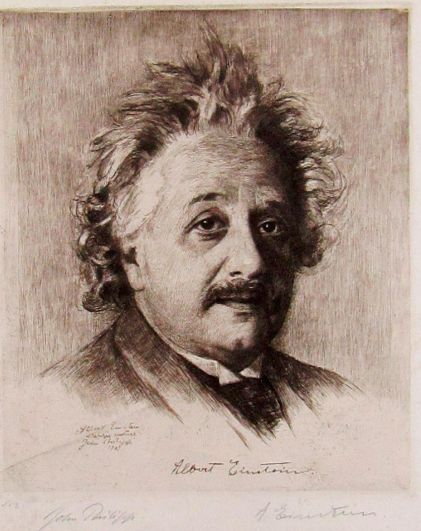
Etching 2

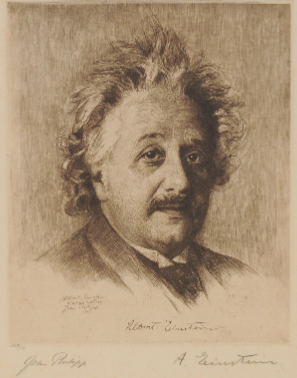
Etching 3

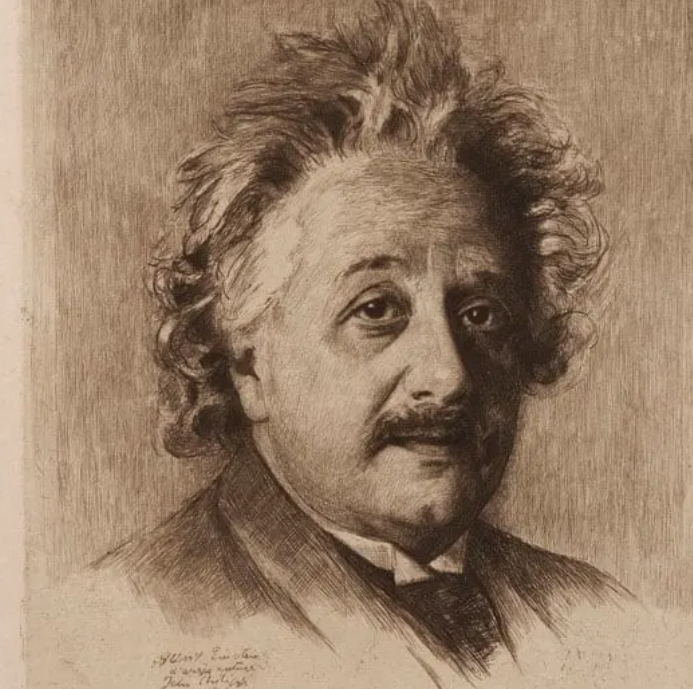
Etching 4
