= Suzanna W. Miles =

American Mayanist

Suzanna ('Sue') Whitelaw Miles (June 7, 1922 in Mount Carroll, Illinois – April 10, 1966 in Boston) was an American ethnohistorian, anthropologist and archaeologist. Miles was known for her work among the Maya peoples of the North-western Guatemalan highlands, her analyses of early-colonial sources on Pre-Hispanic Maya culture and society (particularly her study of 16th-century Poqom social structure), and her pioneering studies of pre-Columbian Maya civilization urban environments and settlement patterns.

== Early life and education ==
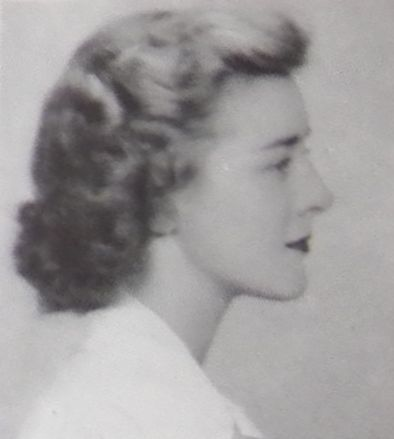
Suzanna Miles in 1942.

Miles' education began in her hometown of Mount Carroll, where during a prolonged childhood illness, her grandfather encouraged her to exercise her intellect. She began her undergraduate studies at Shimer College (1941-1942), which was then a women's junior college and located in Mount Carroll. She finished her degree at nearby Beloit College (1942-1943), and continued to the University of Chicago, where she completed her MA in 1948. From 1945 to 1947, she was the Curator of Archeology and Ethnology for the State Historical Society of Wisconsin. After teaching for a time at the University of Wisconsin, she completed her Ph.D. in anthropology at Radcliffe College in 1955. Her groundbreaking doctoral dissertation, The Sixteenth-Century Pokom-Maya: A Documentary Analysis of Social Structure and Archaeological Setting, was published in book form by the American Philosophical Society in 1957.

== Further career ==
Miles also undertook work for the Bollingen Foundation, particularly the translation of Las Casas's 'Historia de las Indias', a project that stranded because of the loss of her manuscripts. Her obituarist, Tatiana Proskouriakoff, wrote concerning these and other unfinished projects, that "It is unlikely that anyone else can continue the projects she had begun, for she relied strongly on a phenomenal memory, composing an entire thesis in her mind before putting anything down on paper, and her notes probably do not reflect the knowledge that she had acquired. This will be a serious loss to all Maya scholars."

Most of Miles' career was spent in Guatemala, where she became the first woman to reach the highest professorial rank of catedrática in anthropology, while at the Universidad de San Carlos in her final years. Having returned from Guatemala because of a developing illness, she went to Boston for treatment, where she died a year later at the age of 43. She lies buried at Oak Hill Cemetery, Mt. Carroll, Illinois.

== Bibliography ==
- 1952 An analysis of modern Middle American calendars: a study in conservation. In Proceedings and selected papers of the XXIXth International Congress of Americanists 2: 273-284.
- 1957 The sixteenth-century Pokom Maya: a documentary analysis of social structure and archaeological setting. Transactions of the American Philosophical Society (ns.) 47: 733-781.
- 1960 Mam residence and the maize myth. In Culture in history: essays in honor of Paul Radin. Stanley Diamond, ed. New York, Columbia University Press, pp. 430–436.
- 1963 Informe sobre Kaminal Juyu. Antropologia e Historia de Guatemala 15:37-38.
- 1965 Sculpture of the Guatemala-Chiapas highlands and Pacific slopes, and associated hieroglyphs. In Handbook of Middle American Indians. Vol. 2. Robert Wauchope and Gordon R. Willey, eds. pp. 237–275.
- 1965 Summary of preconquest ethnology of the Guatemala-Chiapas highlands and Pacific slopes. In Handbook of Middle American Indians. Vol. 2. Robert Wauchope and Gordon R. Willey, eds. pp. 276–287.
