= Regina's Closet =

2007 memoir by Diana Raab

- Cover
- Author: Diana Raab
- Language: English
- Genre: Memoir
- Publisher: Beaufort Books
- Publication date: 1 September 2007
- Publication place: United States
- Pages: 192
- ISBN: 082-5-3057-5-6

Regina's Closet, or Regina's Closet: Finding My Grandmother's Secret Journal, is a memoir and biography written by author Diana Raab. It is best known for winning the 2008 National Indie Excellence Award for memoir.

== Summary ==
Raab's grandmother, Regina, inexplicably ends her own life. At that time, ten-year-old Diana was devastated by the loss and haunted by questions she never got to ask her grandmother. Three decades later, Diana discovers her grandmother's journal, which gives her a window into the unknown events of Regina's tumultuous life, including surviving World War I, the heartbreak of being orphaned, and the pandemonium of events during her immigration from Poland to Austria to France and finally to the United States. Diana draws strength from her grandmother's example, which sustains her when she receives some of her own shattering news. To share her personal story, Diana must first tell Regina's. The end result is a braided narrative with excerpts of Regina's diary interwoven with Diana's own life experiences; creating a portrait between granddaughter and grandmother, their past and present, loves and losses, and the discovery of their shared legacy.

== Awards ==
- 2008 National Indie Excellence Award (NIEA) for Memoir
- Allbooks Review Editor's Choice Award
- 2008 National Best Books Award sponsored by USA Book News for Memoir/Autobiography - Finalist
- 2007 Foreword Magazine Book of the Year for Memoir - Finalist
- 2008-2009 Next Generation Indie Book Award for Memoir - Finalist
- Sophie Brody Award - Nominee
- 2008 New York Book Festival - Honorable Mention
- 2004 Florida Freelance Writer's Association Writing Competition Award - Winner (non-published, nonfiction excerpt)

== Bibliography ==
Raab, Diana (2007). Regina's Closet: Finding My Grandmother's Secret Journal. Beaufort Books. pp. 192. ISBN 082-5-3057-5-6.
