= Campbell Center for Historic Preservation Studies =

Museum studies school in Illinois, US

Coordinates: 42.09245°N 89.97710°W

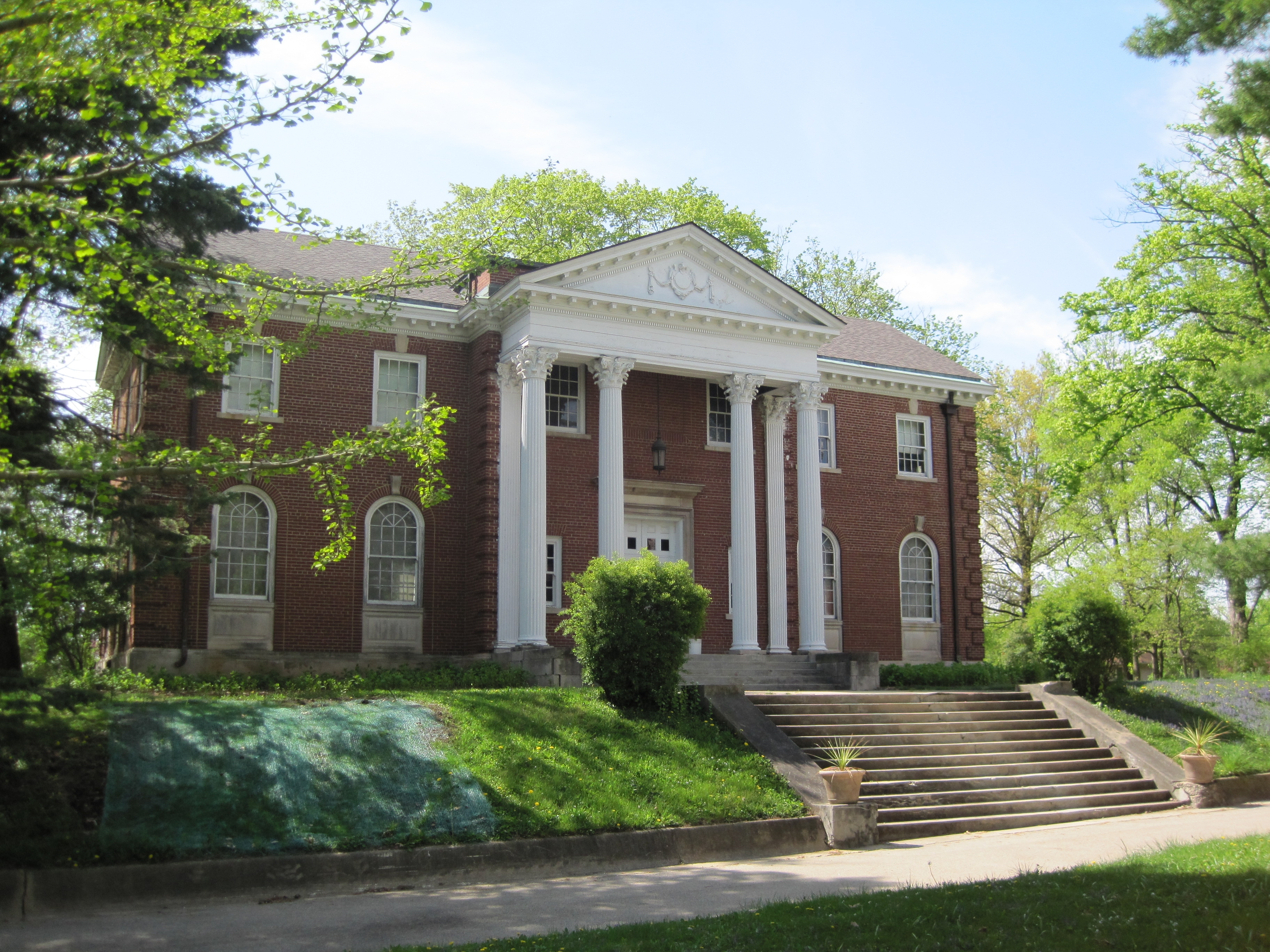
The former Campbell Memorial Library, constructed 1925, now part of the Campbell Center

The Campbell Center for Historic Preservation Studies is an American museum studies school located in Mount Carroll, Illinois.

In 1979, the Center purchased the campus of Shimer College, which had occupied the site from 1853 until moving cross-state to Waukegan. The campus was placed on the National Register of Historic Places in 1980. Classes began that summer.

The Center primarily offers summer-semester continuing education in the areas of historic preservation, conservation, and collections care. In 2005, the Center initiated a certificate program in preventive care of artifacts. The instructors are experienced professionals drawn from institutions and companies around the world, and students come from several countries as well.

On November 2, 2012, ground was broken for the Frances Wood Shimer Memorial Arboretum, named after Shimer College founder and first president Frances Shimer, who planted thousands of trees around the campus. The formal dedication of the arboretum was set for June 2013.

== See also ==
- Mount Carroll Historic District
