= Samuel James Campbell =

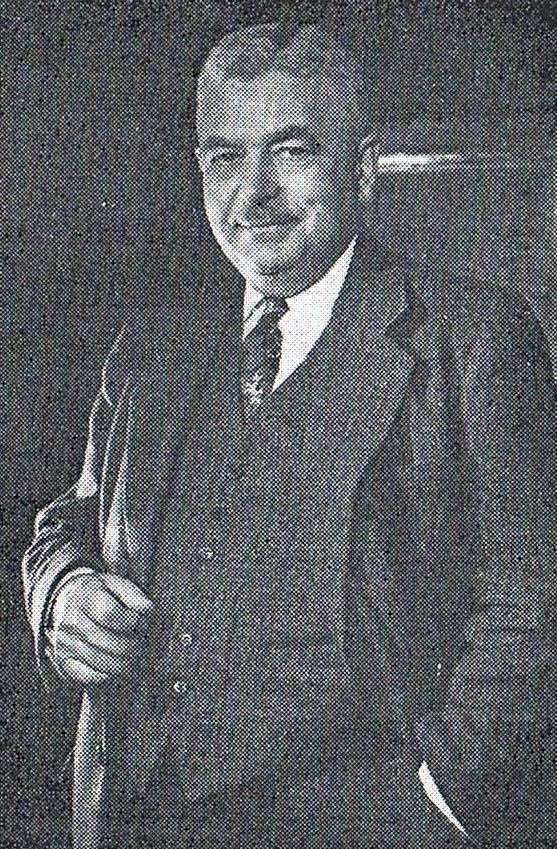
Photo of Campbell from 1953

Samuel James Campbell (June 18, 1892 in Mount Carroll – September 3, 1981 in Tucson) was a prominent banker, businessman and civic leader in Mount Carroll, Illinois, in the first half of the 20th century. He operated several farms that raised Angus cattle and owned the Kable News Company of Mount Morris, Illinois, a national distributor of magazines. He headed the boards of trustees of Shimer College for more than 20 years, and was also chairman of the board at Beloit College.

Campbell's Mount Carroll residence, built in 1925 when he was the vice president of the Carroll County State Bank, is now part of the Mount Carroll Historic District. It was designed by architect Carroll A. Klein.

== Early life and education ==
Campbell received a certificate in music from Shimer College in 1909; although it was then almost exclusively a girls' preparatory school, Shimer allowed occasional male day students.

Campbell subsequently studied at Beloit College through 1913, and received a Bachelor of Arts in economics from Stanford University in 1914. On October 10 of the same year, he married fellow Stanford graduate Ileen Bullis.

== Career and civic life ==
Campbell's "Kable News Co." was listed as distributor of thirty three comic titles during the United States Senate Subcommittee on Juvenile Delinquency's investigation into a possible connection between comic books and juvenile delinquency.

Campbell was a friend of Holman Pettibone of Chicago, a member of the Eisenhower administration. In 1955 Pettibone arranged to have Campbell invited to a stag dinner at the White House where he met President Dwight D. Eisenhower. He was invited again in 1957 for a dinner (indefinitely postponed) to be given in honor of President René Coty of France. Eisenhower, who also had an interest in Angus cattle and who kept two herds at his farm in Gettysburg (now the Eisenhower National Historic Site), kept in contact with Campbell for the rest of the administration.

Campbell was a long-time member of the boards of trustees of both his hometown alma mater Shimer College and nearby Beloit College. His service on the Shimer College board began in 1924, and he held the chairmanship for more than 20 years, from 1935 to 1956. At Beloit, he joined the board in 1938 and chaired it from 1958 to 1963. He also served as an advisor to the University of Arizona after taking up residence there later in life.

A "Samuel J. Campbell Plaza" was dedicated at Beloit College in 1976. The Department of Economics at Beloit is also named after him.
