= Timber Lake Playhouse =

Coordinates: 42.05233°N 89.93848°W

The Timber Lake Playhouse, founded in 1961, is the oldest continuously operating professional and resident summer stock theatre company in Illinois.

The playhouse stands in rural Mount Carroll Township, Carroll County, Illinois, a short distance southeast of the town of Mount Carroll. It is located on the Timber Lake reservoir, on the east branch of Johnson Creek, near the Timber Lake resort. The playhouse is adjacent to the Timber Lake Campground and Resort.

The current theatre structure was built and opened in June 1975, following a fire that destroyed the initial facility the previous year. The theatre is now outfitted with 371 fixed seats overlooking a 45-foot semi-thrust revolving stage. An additional 18 buildings on the ground serve various residence and preparation functions, including scene and costume shops and a large rehearsal pavilion.

Beginning in 2018, Timber Lake Playhouse operates under a SPT 8 agreement with Actors Equity Association (AEA).

== History ==
Every company member was a star, everyone an apprentice. All work was shared. Every actor was a stage technician, and vice-versa. All were janitors, seamstresses, box office staffers, grounds keepers, concessionaires. We were there to practice total theater.

The playhouse had its origins in the town-and-gown legacy of Shimer College, located at that time in Mount Carroll. Students, faculty members and their families, plus business and professional leaders from across 6 counties in northwestern Illinois, also 2 more in eastern Iowa, responded to planning and start-up enlistment by Andrew Bro, the college's chaplain and theatre director, and by Donald Mackay, owner of the Timber Lake properties and constructor of the reservoir. Frequent meetings led the expanding volunteer group to adopt by-laws, not-for-profit incorporation, board and committee formations, and by Thanksgiving weekend, 1961, to official groundbreaking. Bro was elected the first president of the corporation, but Mackay chose to be an independent advisor, a property lessor, and a philanthropic friend.

For the initial 1962 season Bro was the de facto artistic director. Because he was working as a volunteer, he did not assume that title. He auditioned and hired a 24-member resident company, and staged two of the summer's eight productions, all but the final musical presented in a one-week, 5 performance schedule. With Mackay's sawmill help, locally milled hardwoods were used in constructing much of the original building. Containing a wide proscenium stage and 370 fixed seats donated by a nearby movie house, the theatre's opening night arrived on June 28, 1962, and eight more performances of Teahouse of the August Moon ensued.

The original playhouse building was destroyed by fire in the early morning of July 22, 1974, shortly after a sold-out showing of Under the Gaslight. It was replaced by the current structure.

In 2006, the company put on its first all-black production, Ain't Misbehavin', to sold-out crowds.

In 2013, the company announced the first regional production of the Monty Python musical adaptation Spamalot. The company secured the rights in 2012, but was not allowed to announce this fact until May 2013.
