= Caroline Mark Home =

- U.S. National Register of Historic Places
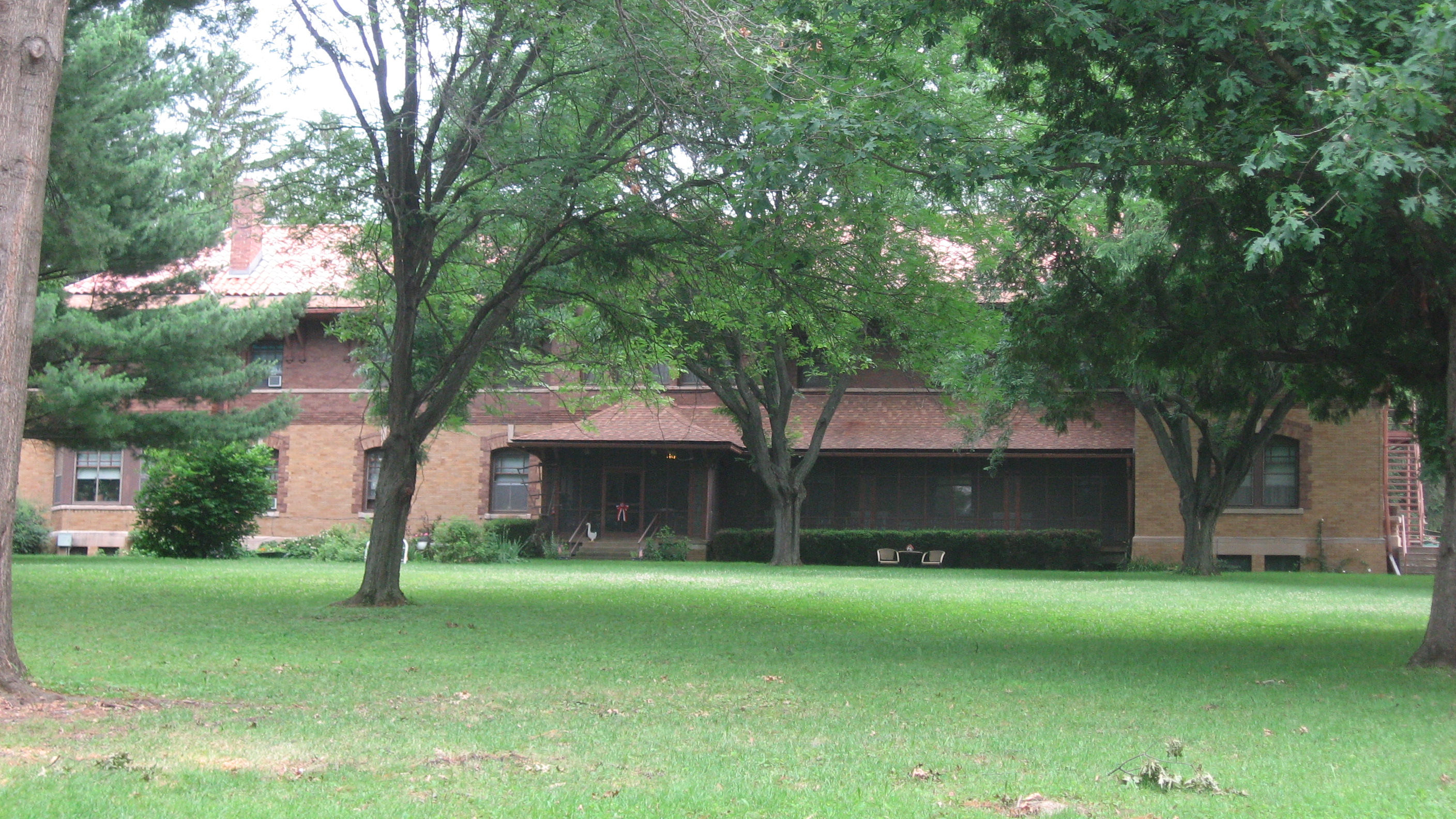

- Location within Illinois Location within the United States
- Location: 222 E. Lincoln St., Mount Carroll, Illinois
- Coordinates: 42°6′3″N 89°58′29″W
- Area: 4.9 acres (2.0 ha)
- Built: 1906
- Architect: Brandt, Berkeley
- Architectural style: American Craftsman
- NRHP reference No.: 83000303
- Added to NRHP: August 11, 1983

The Caroline Mark Home is a historic retirement home located at 222 East Lincoln Street in Mount Carroll, Illinois. The home was built in 1906 through an endowment made in Caroline Mark's estate. Mark, who died in 1900, and her husband James were longtime Mount Carroll residents; as James was president of the city's First National Bank, the two were quite wealthy. Mark bequeathed her estate to provide housing for the area's elderly women, who were often poor and had little to no social support. The home was built and operated using the funds from her estate and is still funded by the income provided by Mark's real estate holdings. The building has a Craftsman design with buttered masonry joints, corbelled brickwork, and reinforced concrete floors to provide long-term structural integrity.

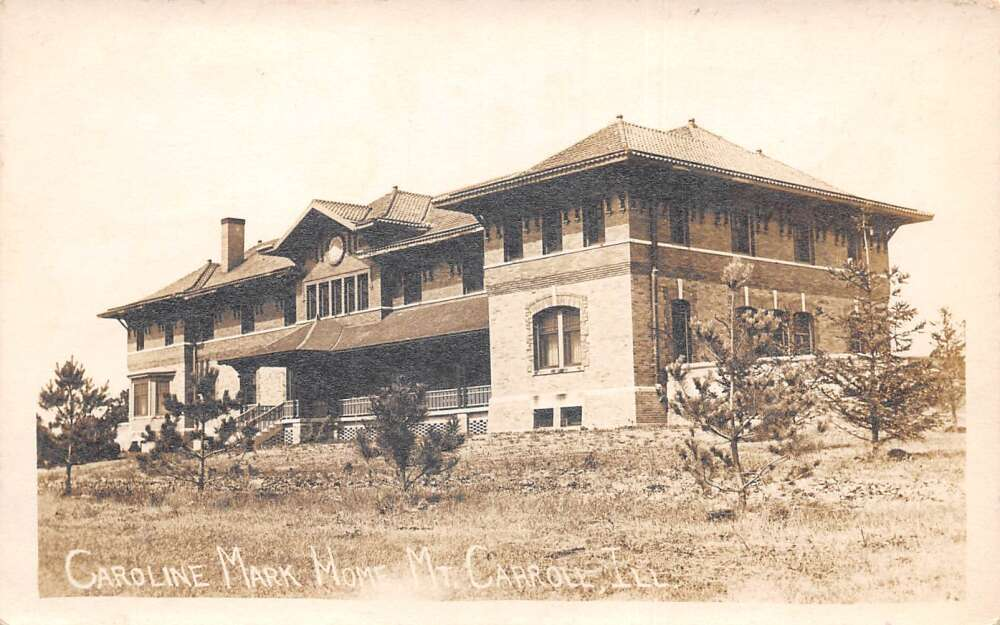
The Caroline Mark Home was shown on a real photo postcard mailed on August 26, 1910.

The home was added to the National Register of Historic Places on August 11, 1983.
