= Nathaniel Halderman House =

Historic house in Illinois, United States

- U.S. National Register of Historic Places
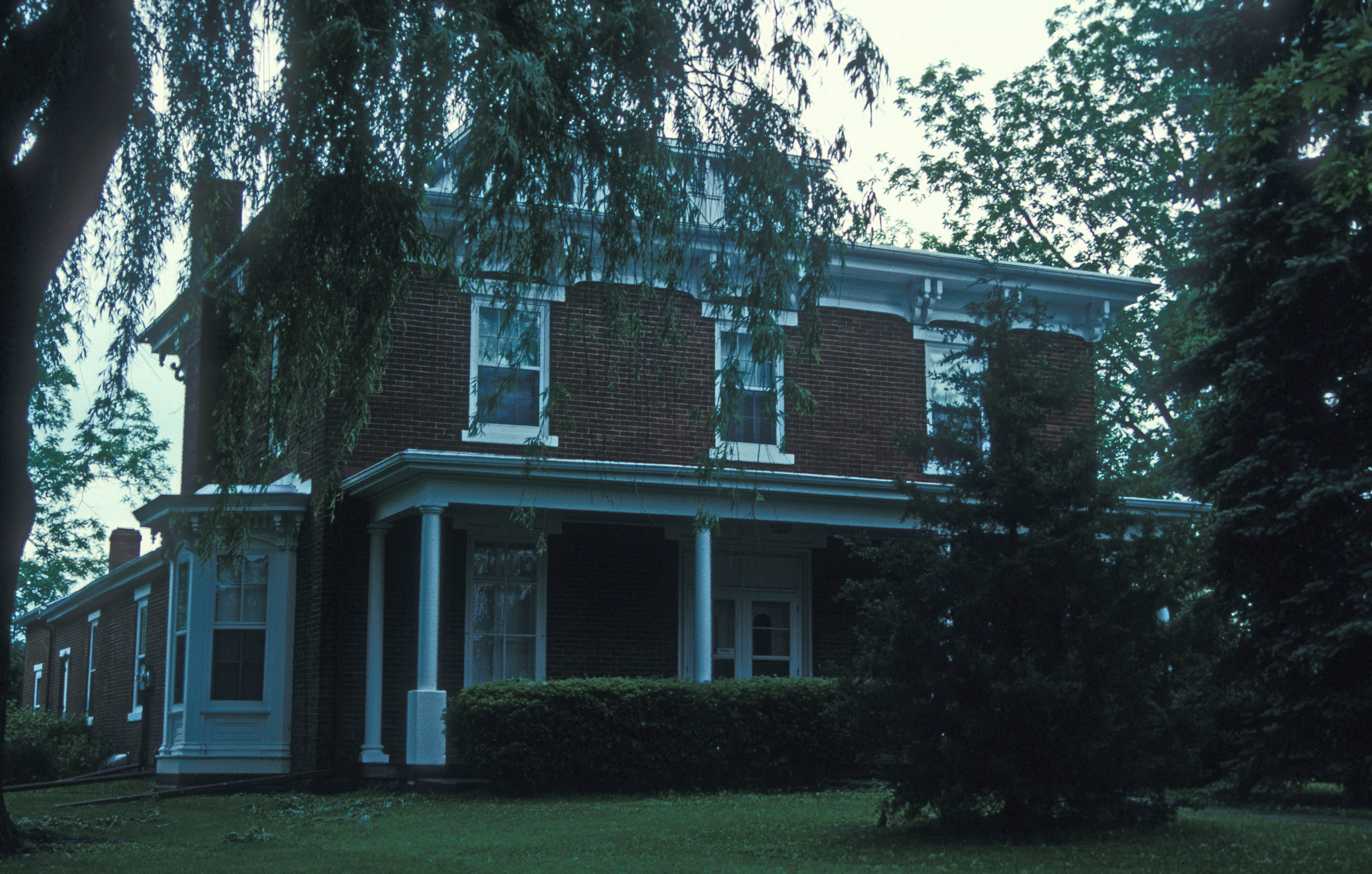

- Location within Illinois Location within the United States
- Location: 728 E. Washington St., Mount Carroll, Illinois
- Coordinates: 42°5′52″N 89°58′18″W
- Area: 1.1 acres (0.45 ha)
- Built: 1854
- Architect: Emmert, Jacob
- Architectural style: Italianate
- NRHP reference No.: 80001339
- Added to NRHP: November 24, 1980

The Nathaniel Halderman House is a historic house located at 728 East Washington Street in Mount Carroll, Illinois. The house was built in 1854 for Nathaniel Halderman, an early settler of Carroll County. Halderman came to the county in 1841; he partnered with other early settlers to plat Mount Carroll and build the town's first mill. He was the city's first mayor and later Carroll County's treasurer. Jacob Emmert, one of Halderman's business partners, built the Italianate house using brick from the city's brickyard. The house's design features an open porch along the front, a cornice with paired brackets, and a cupola atop the roof.

The house was added to the National Register of Historic Places on November 24, 1980.
