= Eleonore von Raab =

Austrian mineral collector (1755-c.1811)

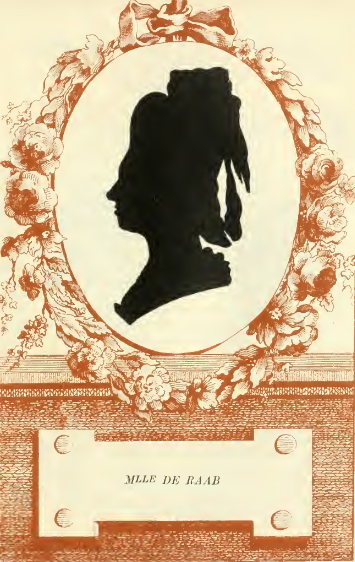
Raab's silhouette by Francois Gornod

Eleonore von Raab, also known as Éléonore de Raab, (1755 – c.1811) was an Austrian collector of minerals, whose collection was catalogued by Ignaz von Born in 1790.

== Personal life ==
Von Raab was the daughter of Franz Anton von Raab (although Wilson names her father as Bartholomeus Raab). She married the Spanish ambassador della Huerta, or Friedrich von Uberta and is sometimes referred to as "Frau von Uberta". Huber and Huber in their 2015 paper about her collection give her dates as "1755-c.1811, having written earlier (2009) that she "must have lived from about 1745 to about 1830", while Wilson gives her dates as "(1741–1793?)", and Schuh could only say "(fl. 1790s)". She died in Valencia, Spain.

== Collection ==
Von Raab built up a collection of about 2,500 specimens, with the assistance of Ignaz von Born. It included 41 specimens bought in 1791 and 1792 from the English collector Philip Rashleigh. Born produced his Catalogue Methodique et Raisonne de la Collection des Fossiles de Mlle. Éléonore de Raab in 1790, in two volumes in an edition of 70 copies. This formed the basis of William Babington's 1799 "A New System of Mineralogy, in the form of a Catalogue, after the manner of Baron Born's Systematic Catalogue of the collection of fossils of Mlle Éléonore de Raab. A copy of Born's catalogue was among 213 books from James Smithson's collection which were bequeathed to the Smithsonian Institution.

After Born's death in 1791, Von Raab's collection was sold to Count Moritz Christian Friess of Vienna. Friess's collection was sold in 1824, a major purchaser being Ferdinand Zimmerman of the Medicinisch-Chirurgische Josephs-Akademie.

In 2009, Simone and Peter Huber reported that they believed they had found the collection, with about 45% of the specimens remaining. They had found a reference in the Esterházy archives at Forchtenstein Castle to "Die kleinere Mineralien-Sammlung oder die ehemalige Sammlung des Fräulein von Raab." ("The smaller mineral collection, or the former collection of Miss von Raab"), described as being in two cabinets with drawers and glass doors. On being given permission to investigate a mineral collection which they knew was housed in the castle, they found two cabinets and a collection in a poor condition but with many specimens still labelled. The cabinets each held 30 drawers which were divided into 7x7 = 49 sections, allowing for a total of 2 x 30 x 49 = 2940 specimens. They compared some of the labels with Born's catalogue and found that they corresponded, supporting the identification of the collection. The castle archivist recognised the significance of the collection and agreed to have the cabinets professionally restored and to transfer the cabinets and collection to the Schloss Esterházy in Eisenstadt. In the 2009 paper the authors say that work on the collection is ongoing and a detailed description is in preparation. The Hubers published a paper on "The mineral collection of Eleonore von Raab" in The Mineralogical Record in 2015.
