= James Shaw (Illinois politician) =

American politician

James Shaw (May 3, 1832 – May 30, 1906) was an American judge. lawyer, politician, and geologist.

Shaw was born in Ireland. He emigrated with his family to the United States and settled in Cass County, Illinois. Shaw graduated from Illinois College and studied law in Sterling, Illinois. He was admitted to the Illinois bar and then practiced law in Mount Carroll, Illinois. He also served as the Illinois assistant state geologist for three years and a survey of many northern Illinois counties. Shaw wrote "Monograph of Antiquities" for the Smithsonian Institution about the mound builders of the Rock River and northern Illinois. He served in the Illinois House of Representatives from 1871 to 1875 and from 1877 to 1875. Shaw served as speaker of the house in 1877 and 1878. Shaw was a Republican. He later seed as an Illinois Circuit Court judge until December 1902. Shaw died at his home in Mount Carroll, Illinois from a long illness.
