= Doris Raab =

German etcher and engraver (1851–1933)

- Born: 19 October 1851; Nuremberg, Kingdom of Bavaria
- Died: 1933 (aged 81–82)
- Known for: Etching

Doris Raab (19 October 1851 – 1933) was a German etcher and engraver.

== Biography ==
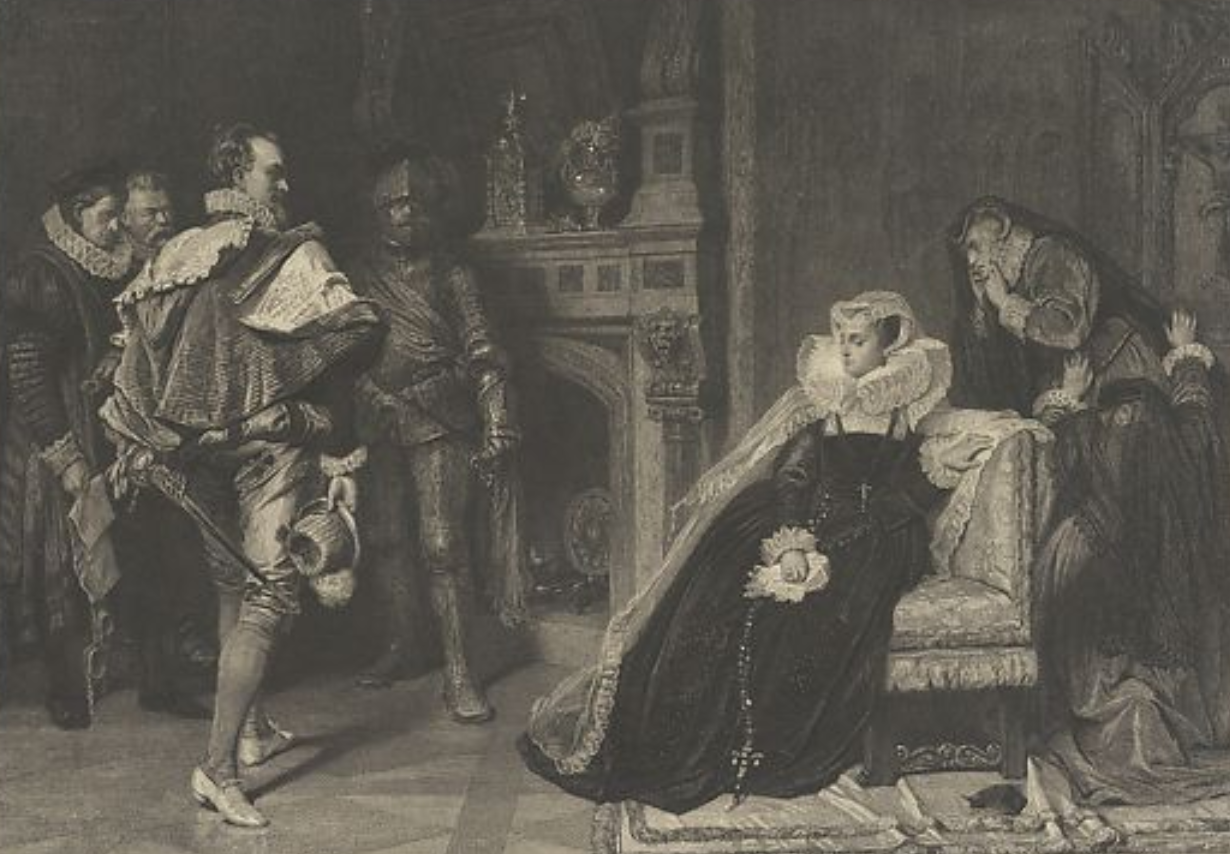
Mary Queen of Scots hears that her death warrant has been signed by Queen Elizabeth I. - engraved by Raab in 1877/8

Raab was born on 19 October 1851 in Nuremberg. She was the daughter of the artist Johann Leonhard Raab who was also her teacher. She did her engravings using a burin.

Doris Raab exhibited her work at the Palace of Fine Arts at the 1893 World's Columbian Exposition in Chicago, Illinois. She also exhibited her work at the 1900 Exposition Universelle in Paris.

Her engraving of Mary Queen of Scots receiving the news that her death warrant has been signed by her cousin Queen Elizabeth was published in December 1878 in The Art Journal. It was based on a painting by the Bavarian Karl von Piloty and the magazine was distributed in the UK and the USA.

Raab died in 1933.

== Honors and distinctions ==
She was awarded medals at exhibitions in Nuremberg, Berlin and Munich. In 1885, at the Paris Salon, she was given an honourable mention. In 1900, she received a silver medal at the World's Fair (Exposition Universelle) in Paris.

== Gallery ==
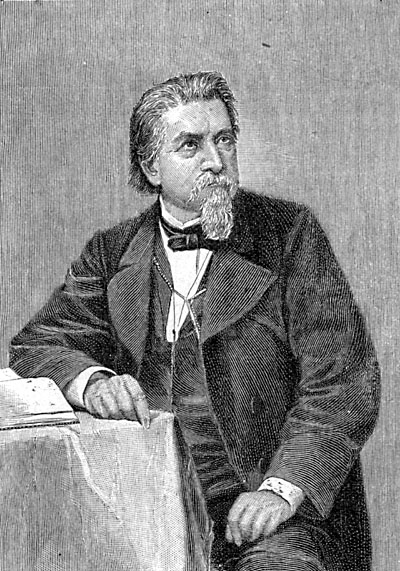
Portrait of Karl Gutzkow, 1905.

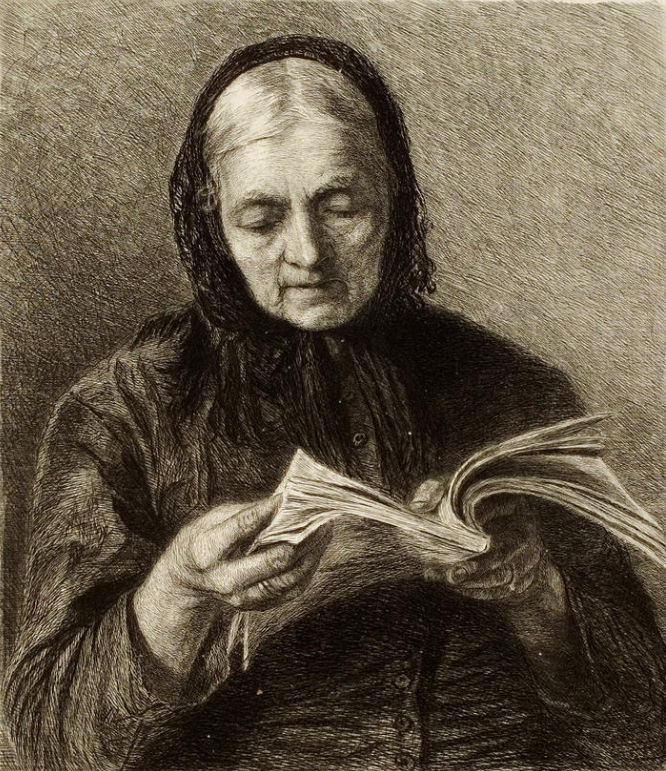
Lesende Frau (Woman reading), 1893.

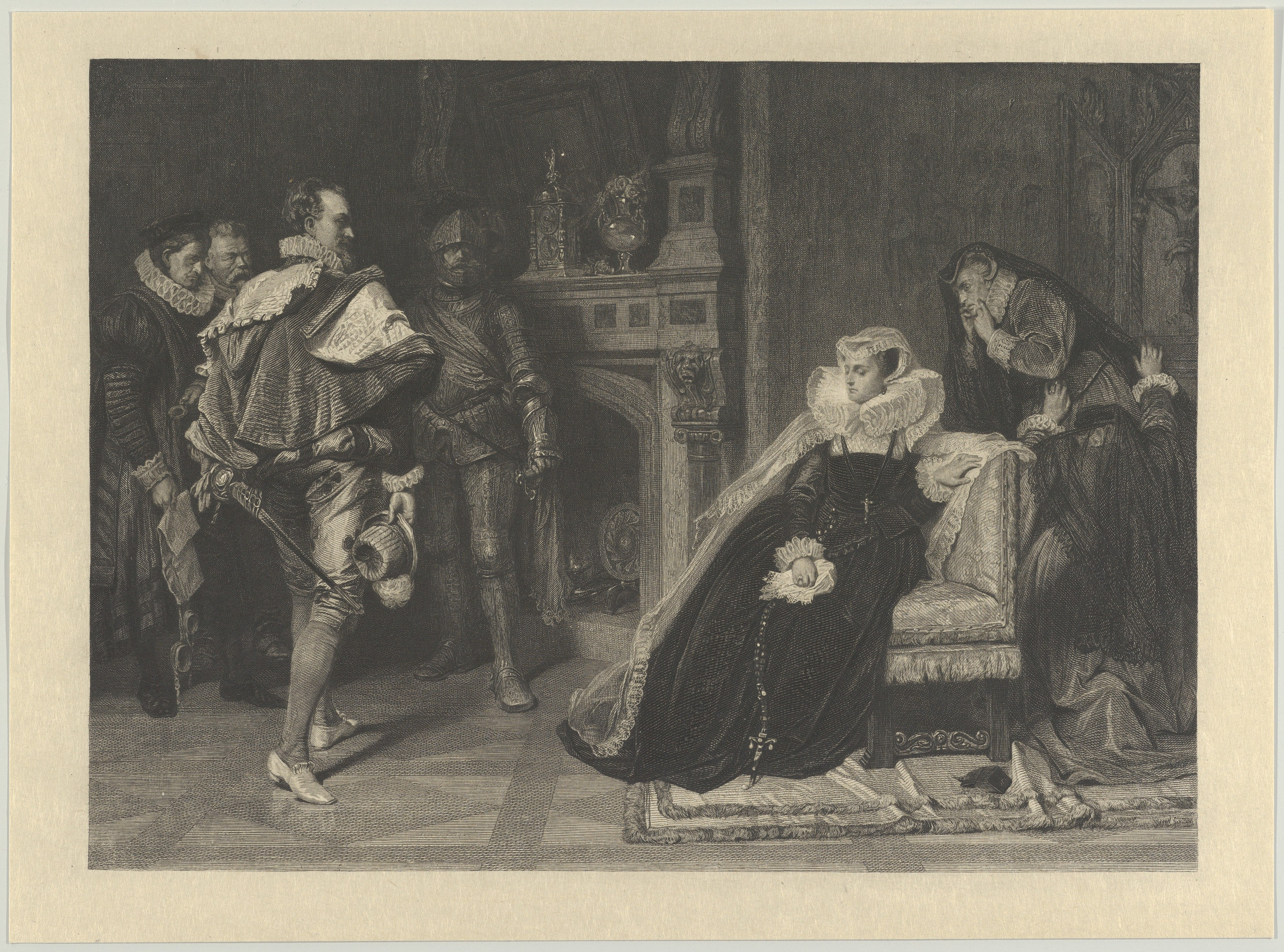
'Mary Stuart Listening to the Order of Her Execution, about 1878.

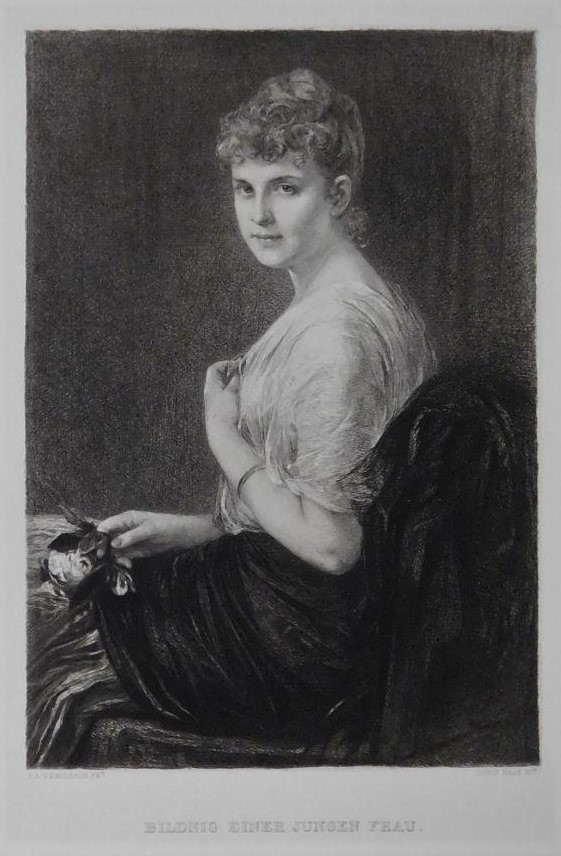
Portrait of a young woman, (1890).
