= Franz Anton von Raab =

Austrian nobleman (1722–1783)

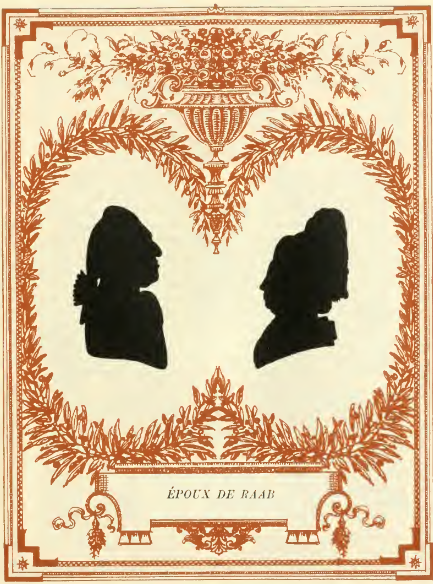
Raab and his wife Antonia, silhouettes by Francois Gornod

Franz Anton von Raab (1722–1783) was an Austrian agrarian reformer and a minister under Maria Theresa. He championed economic reforms known as Raabization, in which church-owned land was sold to peasants in return for cash payments that freed them from their obligated robota labor.

His daughter Eleonore von Raab built up a substantial collection of minerals which was widely known after being catalogued by Ignaz von Born.
