= George Raab =

Canadian artist (born 1948)

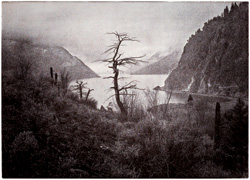
- Lone Pine (etching), 2000
- Born: 1948 (age 77–78); Marseille, France
- Education: University of Toronto, General Arts with intaglio studio work; Ontario College of Art and Design, Creative Arts courses; Sheridan College School of Visual Arts, Creative Arts (specializing in printmaking)

George Raab (born 1948) is a Canadian printmaker who has gained an international reputation for his wilderness landscape photo-based etchings and aquatints.

== Career ==
Raab spent his early years in Toronto and discovered printmaking as a student at Sheridan College in Oakville, Ontario. After graduating in 1971 with a diploma in fine arts, he enrolled in the University of Toronto as an extension student to study in the printmaking studio, and also studied etching at Erindale College, University of Toronto. In 1970, he travelled internationally. By 1978, he was living a few miles north of Bancroft, Ontario. There he set up a studio and by May 1978 held his first solo show at the Downstairs Gallery, Bancroft. He moved to Lakefield, Ontario, in 1980 to be nearer Trent University at Peterborough and became artist-in-residence in 1981, at Trent University's Otonabee College. At Trent University in 1981, he held a retrospective exhibition of etchings. Since then, he has held dozens of solo exhibitions as well as participated in many group shows throughout Canada, the United States, Europe and the Far East. His work is included in more than 100 public, private, and corporate collections, including the Art Gallery of Ontario. Among Raab's numerous awards is the Grand Prize for Prints at the prestigious American Biennial of Graphic Art. He lives today and has his studio in Millbrook.

His intaglio images are made by creating grooves and textures below the surface of zinc or copper plates. The techniques he uses most frequently are etching, aquatinting, photo-etching, and watercolour painting. His inspiration and subject matter is from the natural areas around Millbrook, Ontario and the Kawarthas.

He is a former director of the Algonquin Arts Council; a member of the Canadian Artists’ Representation, Ontario, the founder and former curator of the Ironwood Art Gallery, Trent University, Peterborough; a member of the International Graphics Society, New York, New York; a former member of the Executive Council of the Ontario Society of Artists' a member of the board of directors of the Otonabee Conservation Foundation; a member of the Print and Drawing Council of Canada; and of the Print Club, Cleveland, Ohio.

"My original landscape etchings are bits and pieces of a familiar landscape. There is a sense of peace and solace within them, of mystery and primal longings. They are a cry for the preservation of those wild lands we need in order to know ourselves, and a celebration of our natural heritage. Printmaking, my chosen medium, is very indirect and elusive. In these intaglio prints there is a sense of the mystery of the wild lands we all need in order to better know ourselves.".
