= Carroll County Courthouse (Illinois) =

Local government building in the United States

- U.S. National Register of Historic Places
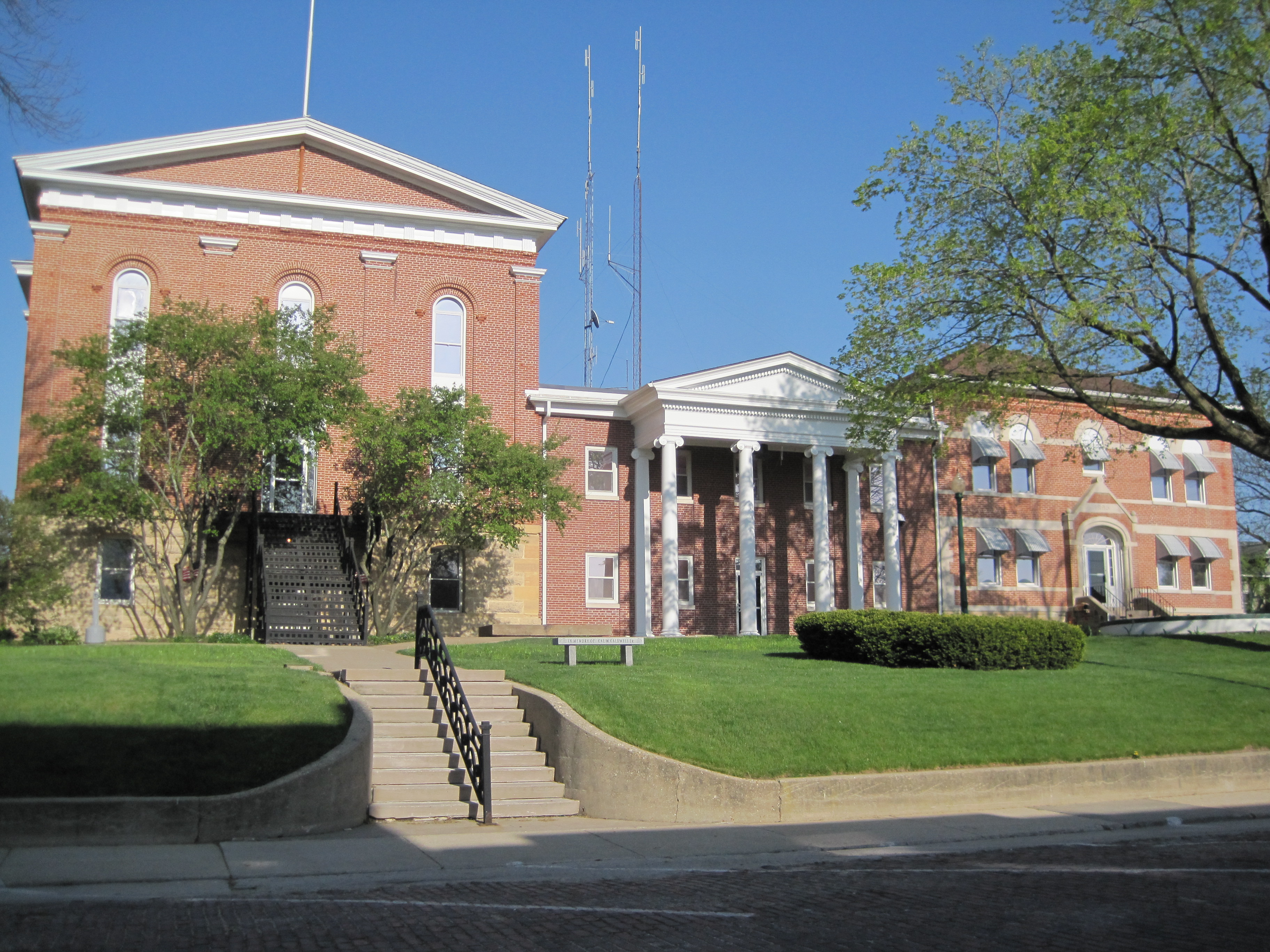

- Location within Illinois Location within the United States
- Interactive map showing the location of Carroll County Courthouse
- Location: Courthouse Sq., Mount Carroll, Illinois
- Coordinates: 42°6′2″N 89°58′42″W
- Area: 1 acre (0.40 ha)
- Built: 1858
- Architect: Glasted & Michelson
- NRHP reference No.: 73000692
- Added to NRHP: November 26, 1973

The Carroll County Courthouse, located in Courthouse Square in Mount Carroll, is the county courthouse of Carroll County, Illinois. The courthouse, which was designed by Chicago architects Olmstead and Nicholson, was built in 1858 and has been used continuously since. During the Civil War, the courthouse also served as a barracks for the county's troops prior to their commissioning. The Lorado Taft Monument, a memorial to the county's Civil War veterans, was added to the site in 1891. According to Ripley's Believe It or Not, the monument is the only Civil War memorial with an annex, which was added to fit names which had been left off the original memorial.

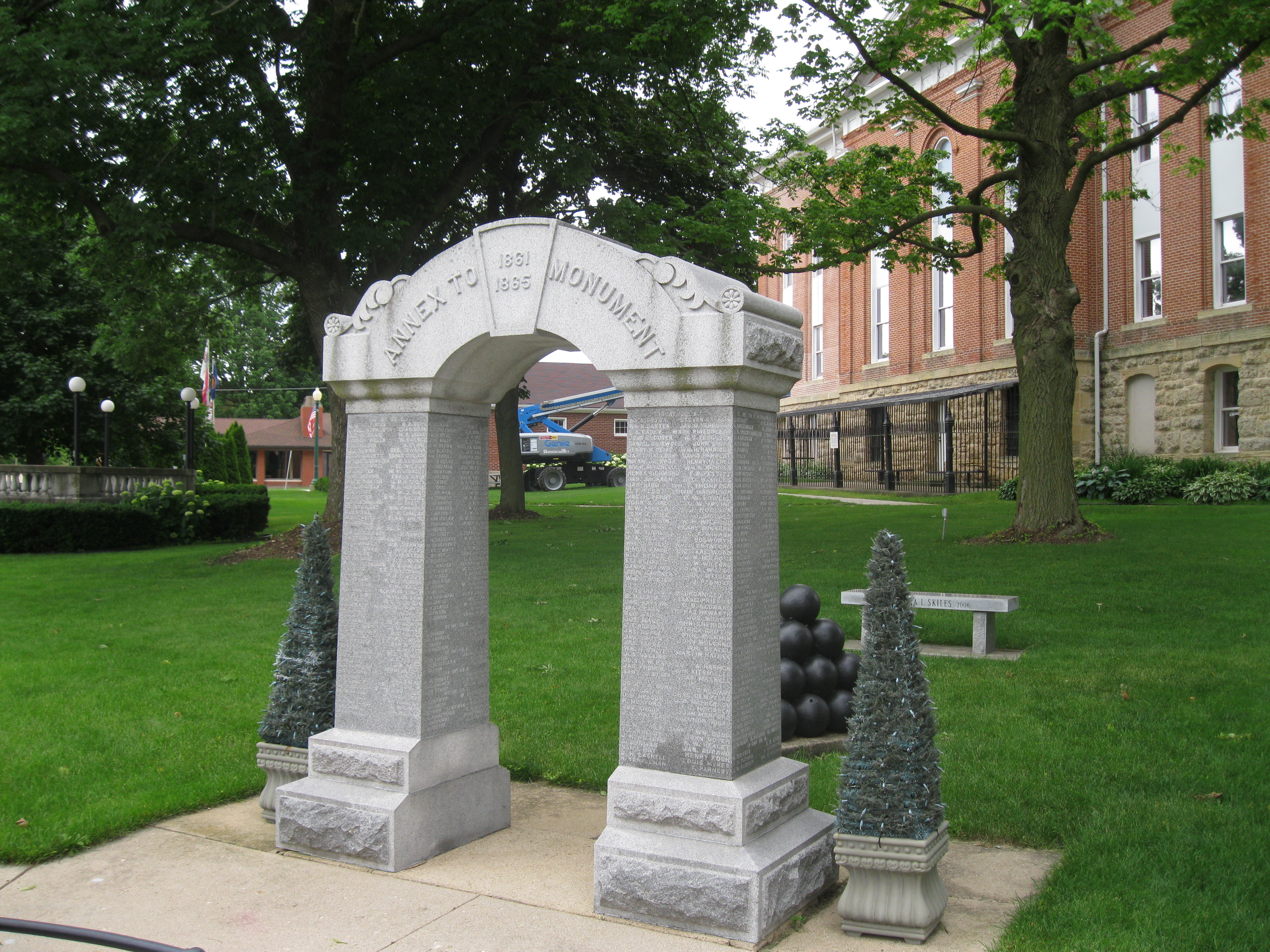
The annex to the Civil War memorial

The courthouse was added to the National Register of Historic Places on November 26, 1973.
