= Johann Leonhard Raab =

German printmaker & painter (1825–1899)

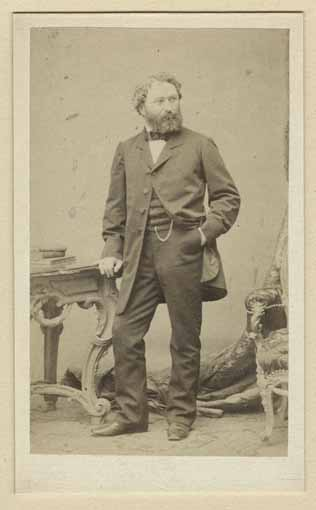
Johann Leonhard Raab, c. 1870

Johann Leonhard Raab (29 March 1825 in Unterschwaningen – 2 April 1899 in Munich) was a German printmaker and painter.

== Life ==
After receiving his basic education in public schools in Nuremberg, he attended the Academy of Fine Arts there. Although he began as a painter, he was soon attracted to engraving and began formal studies with Samuel Amsler. At first, he concentrated on small plates for book publishers but, even then, his mature pictorial style became apparent. Eventually, in 1866, on the recommendation of Julius Thaeter (1804–1870), he was appointed to succeed the latter as Professor of Engraving at the Academy of Fine Arts, Munich.

He retired in 1895 and, with three of his friends, opened a painting studio.

Raab's works can be found in several museums, including the Alte Pinakothek in Munich.

His daughter Doris Raab was born in Nuremberg in 1851 and she became his pupil exhibiting in France and Germany. Doris Raab exhibited her work at the Palace of Fine Arts at the 1893 World's Columbian Exposition in Chicago, Illinois.

== Sources ==
- Hyacinth Holland: Raab, Johann Leonhard. In: Allgemeine Deutsche Biographie (ADB). Vol. 53, Duncker & Humblot, Leipzig 1907, S. 181 f.
- Friedrich Pecht: "Verzeichnis der Abbildungen", in: Schiller-Galerie. Charaktere aus Schillers Werken. Gezeichnet von Friedrich Pecht und Arthur von Ramberg, Fünfzig Blätter in Stahlstich mit erläuterndem Texte von Friedrich Pecht, F. A. Brockhaus, Leipzig 1859; online at Google Books.
- Friedrich Pecht: Goethe-Galerie.Charaktere aus Goethes Werken. Gezeichnet von Friedrich Pecht und Arthur von Ramberg, Fünfzig Blätter in Stahlstich mit erläuterndem Texte von Friedrich Pecht, Leipzig: F. A. Brockhaus, 1864;
