= Simon Raab =

American painter

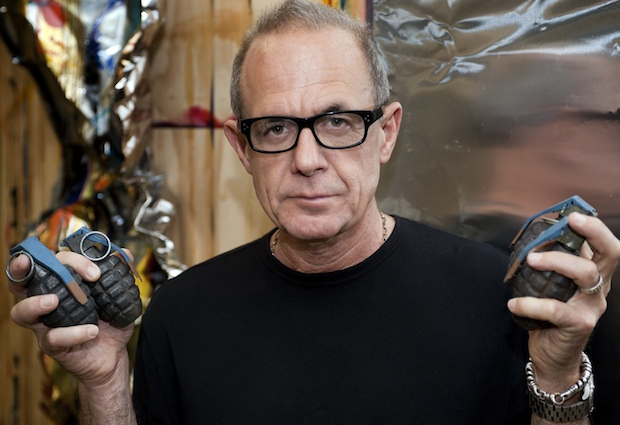
- Born: 1952 (age 73–74); Toulouse, France
- Known for: Technology, physics, Painting, sculpture
- Website: http://www.parleau.com

Simon Raab is an American artist, entrepreneur, inventor and scientist.

== Early life and education ==
Simon Raab was born in Toulouse, France in 1952. He was raised in Canada and immigrated to the United States in 1990. He holds a Ph.D. in Mechanical Engineering from McGill University, Montreal, Canada, a Masters of Engineering Physics (Surface Physics) from Cornell University, US, and a Bachelor of Science in Physics from the University of Waterloo, Canada.

Raab lives and works in Santa Barbara, California.

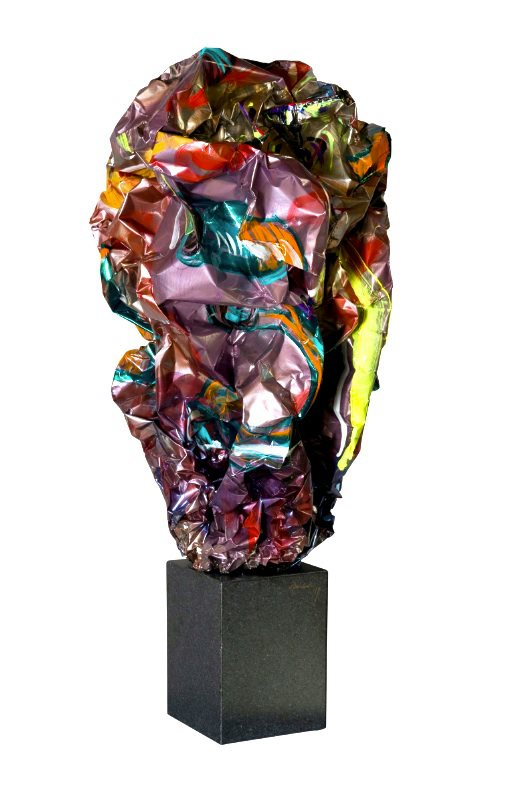
Parleau Sculpture "Complexification" (2011) by Simon Raab

== Scientific career ==
Raab is the co-founder of Faro Technologies. Now retired, he was chief executive officer of the company from its inception in 1982 until January 2017. Faro sold to Ametek in 2025 for approximately $920 million.

Raab holds more than 80 US patents with associated foreign patents in fields of 3D coordinate measuring systems, bio-materials, medical diagnostics and computerized surgical assistance. He has acted as the Chairman of LunglifeAI focusing on diagnostic tests for early lung cancer and has served as Co-Chairman of TrueDigital Surgical, Inc developing the first digital 3D surgical microscopes and robotic guidance systems.

In 2010, he partially endowed a professor in theoretical astrophysics at the University of California, Santa Barbara held by Lars Bildsten.

== Artist ==
Raab comes from a family involved in creative enterprises. His mother was a landscape artist and an acquaintance of Frederick Varley (1881–1969) from Canada's Group of Seven. Raab's uncle, Ernest Raab was a sculptor of Jewish art and created bronze sculptures and glass altars for synagogues and memorial sites, such as the Holocaust Memorial in Earl Bales Park Toronto, Canada. Raab's aunts were fashion designers and his father Alexandre, was a rose hybridizer and the author of "The Manifesto of Entrepreneurial Democracies".

As a scientist and engineer, Raab claims to bring his technical training in materials to bear on his art:

"My art is the result of my many years working in science and physics, encompassing a career focused on 3D measurement devices. [...] Parleau is about realizations. I realize that when I try to control, I control less. I realize that every time I try to color inside the lines that the color leaks out. I realize that understanding begins by admitting I don't understand. In physics, the uncertainty principle embodies the resistance to precision. The art begins formalized, boundary-delimited and planar, and then begins to quickly escape and deform and seek other dimensions."

== Parleau ==
Raab works in a new medium, he calls and patented as "Parleau" ("Parleaux" in the plural) which is French for 'through the water'. The term suggests the quality of light passing through liquid. He uses large-format sheets of metal (aluminum or stainless steel) which he paints first and then forms and sculpts by hand. He creates wall-mounted paintings with embedded frames and freestanding volumetric sculptures.

== Exhibitions ==
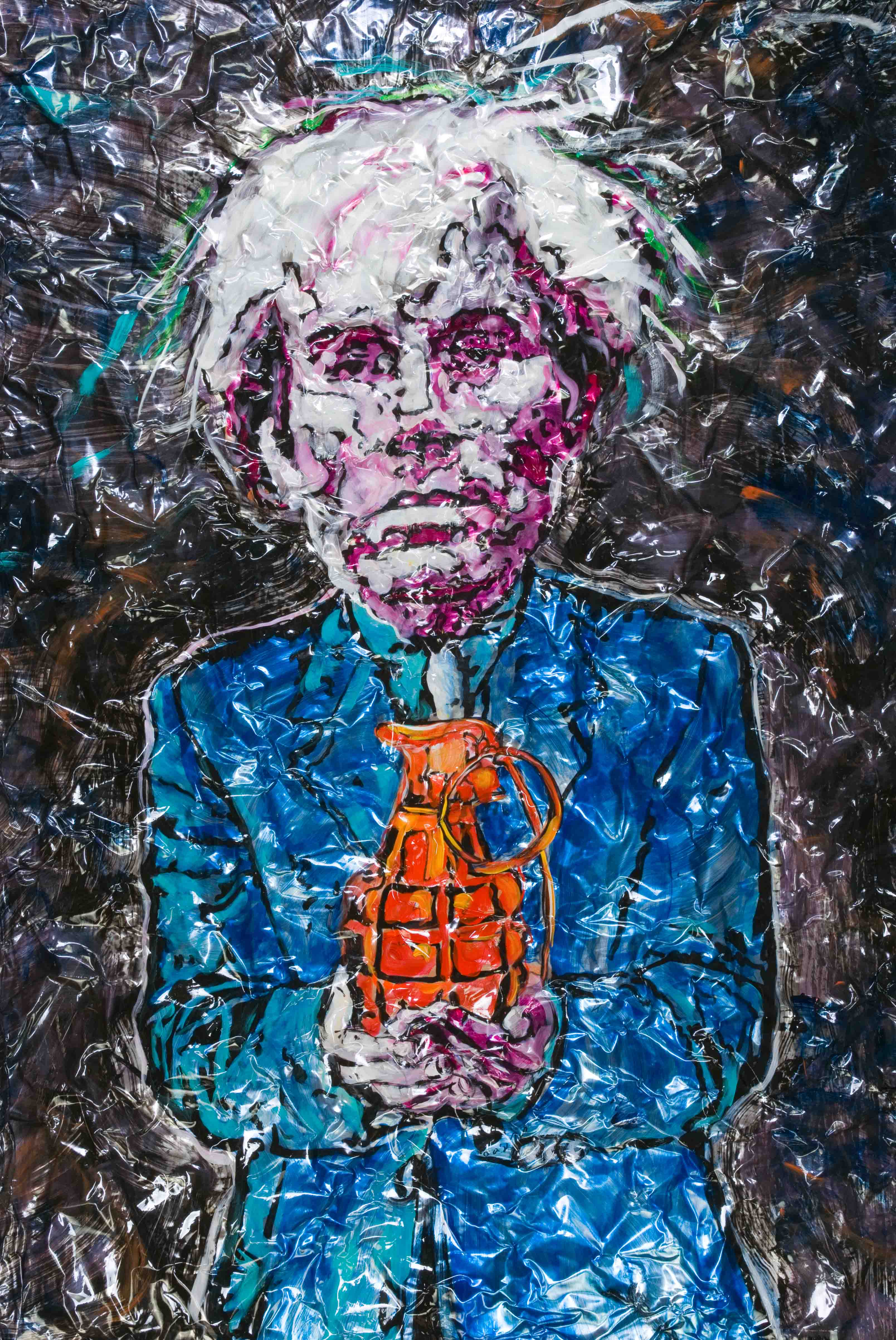
Parleau Wall Work "Andy Boom" (2012) by Simon Raab

=== Solo exhibitions (selection) ===
- "Pull the Pin", Mannheim, Germany, 2012/2013
- "Crushed", Toronto, Canada, 2012
- "Vibrations", Dresden, Germany, 2012
- "Dichtung und Wahrheit", Frankfurt am Main, Germany, 2012
- "Surface Tension", Seoul, South Korea, 2012
- "Parleau 2007–2011", Munich, Germany, 2011
- "From Behind These Bars", Mannheim, Germany, 2011
- "Complexhibition", Mannheim, Germany, 2011
- "From Behind These Bars", Vienna, Austria, 2011
- "Attraverso l'acqua - Parleau", Massa, Italy, 2010/2011
- "What comes together must come apart", Amsterdam, the Netherlands, 2010
- "Attraverso l'acqua - Parleau", Lucca, Italy, 2010
- "Also too late for shame", Mannheim, Germany, 2010
- "The Sun Does Set", London, UK, 2010
- "New Objects - Parleau", Mannheim, Germany, 2009

== Selected bibliography ==
=== Exhibition catalogs and monographs ===
- Simon Raab - Vibrations. Exhibition catalog: Kunsthalle Dresden (publisher), with contributions by Dirk Gädeke and Michael Schultz, 2012, ISBN 978-3-939983-57-6
- Simon Raab - From Behind These Bars. Exhibition catalog: Vienna Künstlerhaus and Mannheimer Kunstverein, Verlag für moderne Kunst Nürnberg (publisher), with contributions by Peter Bogner, Martin Stather and Milan Chlumsky, 2011, ISBN 978-3-86984-210-3
- Simon Raab - Parleau - Attraverso l'acqua. Exhibition catalog: Chiesa di San Matteo/Lucca and Palazzo Ducale Massa, Italy, with contributions by Maurizio Vanni and Alessandro Romanini, Claudio Poleschi Art Contemporanea (publisher), 2010
- Simon Raab - Parleau. Monograph with contributions by Gerard Haggerty, Ulrike Lorenz, Martin Stather and Carsten Ahrens, Galerie Peter Zimmermann (publisher), 2010, ISBN 978-3-9808352-8-2
- Simon Raab - Parleau. Exhibition catalog: Galerie Peter Zimmermann, with a contribution by Gerard Haggerty, 2009

=== Articles ===
- Michael J. Kaufman, "A new Patent issued for an Art Form. The Artist/Inventor turns his back on a $2 Billion Art Factory", Gnome Magazine, June 2013
- Milan Chlumsky, “Die Kunst ist eine Granate“, Rhein-Neckar-Zeitung, December 2012
- “Surface Tension“, Culture Ocean, March 2012
- Rüdiger Heise, “Der kreative Zerstörer“, Applaus Kultur-Magazine, November 2011
- Michael J. Kaufman, "Talking Trademark - Interview with Simon Raab", NY Arts Magazine, August 2011
