= Diana Raab =

American poet

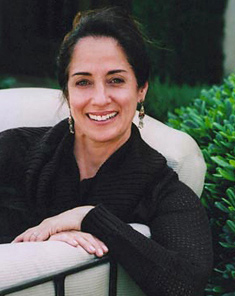
- Diana Raab
- Born: Brooklyn, New York
- Citizenship: American
- Education: Cortland State University; Spalding University; Sofia University (California)
- Occupations: Author, Poet, Blogger, Speaker
- Writing career
- Genres: Memoir, poetry, nonfiction
- Website: www.dianaraab.com

Diana Raab is an American author, poet, lecturer, educator and inspirational speaker.

== Early life ==
Raab was born in Brooklyn, New York of two immigrant parents. She received her B.S. from Cortland State University in Health Administration with a minor in Journalism. She received her R.N. degree from Vanier College in Quebec, Canada and took her licensure in French. In 2003, she earned her MFA in Writing from Spalding University's low residency program in Kentucky. Raab was a medical journalist for 25 years. She has a Ph.D. in Psychology with a concentration in Transpersonal Psychology from Sofia University (Formerly The Institute of Transpersonal Psychology) in Palo Alto. Her research involved the transformative and healing aspects of memoir writing.

== Career ==
Raab received her Ph.D. in Psychology with a concentration in Transpersonal Psychology.

Raab lectures and facilitates workshops in memoir, poetry, and writing for healing and transformation.

== Published Works ==
=== Memoir ===
- Raab, Diana. Hummingbird: Messages from My Ancestors. Modern History Press (2024). (ISBN 978-1615997640)
- Raab, Diana. Healing With Words: A Writer's Cancer Journey. Loving Healing Press (2011). (ISBN 978-1-61599-010-8)
- Raab, Diana. Regina's Closet: Finding My Grandmother's Secret Journal. Beaufort Books (2007). (ISBN 978-0-8253-0575-7)

=== Poetry ===
- Raab, Diana. Lust: Poems WordTech Communications (2014). (ISBN 978-1-62549-058-2)
- Raab, Diana. Listening to Africa: Poems. Antrim House Books (2012). (ISBN 978-1-936482-18-4)
- Raab, Diana. The Guilt Gene: Poems. Plain View Press (2008). (ISBN 978-1935514398)
- Raab, Diana. My Muse Undresses Me. Pudding House Publications (2007). (ISBN 158-998-5354)
- Raab, Diana. Dear Anais: My Life in Poems for You. Plain View Press (2008). (ISBN 978-1-891386-41-1)

=== Anthologies ===
- Raab, Diana. Writers on the Edge: 22 Writers Speak About Addiction and Dependency., co-editor. Foreword by Jerry Stahl. Modern History Press. 2012. (ISBN 978-1-61599-108-2)
- Raab, Diana. Writers and Their Notebooks, Editor. Foreword by Phillip Lopate. The University of South Carolina Press (2010). (ISBN 978-1-57003-866-2 softcover; ISBN 978-1-57003-865-5 hardcover)

=== Self-Help ===
- Raab, Diana. Writing for Bliss: A Companion Journal. Loving Healing Press. (2019). (ISBN 978-1-61599-427-4 paperback)
- Raab, Diana. Writing for Bliss: A Seven-Step Plan for Telling Your Story and Transforming Your Life. Loving Healing Press. (2017). (ISBN 978-1615993239)
- Raab, Diana. Your High Risk Pregnancy: A Practical and Supportive Guide. Hunter House. (2009). (ISBN 978-0897935203)
- Raab, Diana. Getting Pregnant and Staying Pregnant: Overcoming Infertility and Managing Your High Risk Pregnancy. Hunter House (1991, 1999). (ISBN 978-0897-932-387)
