= Mount Carroll, Illinois =

- City
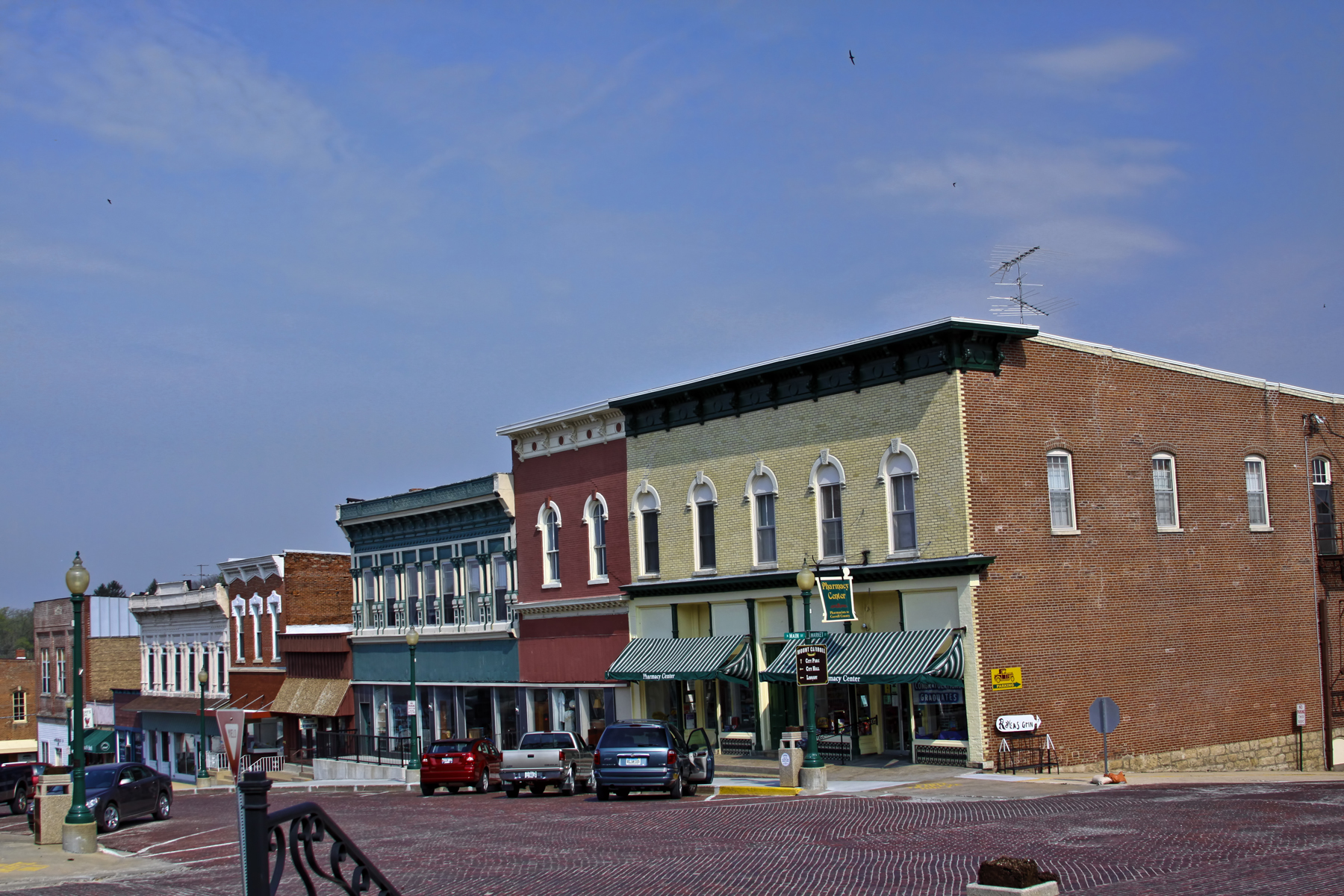
- Mount Carroll Historic District
- Motto: Where we take the time to care
- Interactive map of Mount Carroll, Illinois
- Location within Illinois Location within the United States
- Coordinates: 42°05′41″N 89°58′37″W
- Country: United States
- State: Illinois
- County: Carroll
- Named for: Charles Carroll of Carrollton

Area
  - Total: 2.00 sq mi (5.19 km^{2})
  - Land: 2.00 sq mi (5.19 km^{2})
  - Water: 0 sq mi (0 km^{2})
- Elevation: 794 ft (242 m)

Population (2020)
  - Total: 1,479
  - Density: 738.3/sq mi (285.04/km^{2})
- Time zone: UTC-6 (CST)
  - Summer (DST): UTC-5 (CDT)
- ZIP code: 61053
- Area code: 815
- FIPS code: 17-50881
- GNIS feature ID: 2395121
- Website: www.mtcarrollil.org

Mount Carroll is a city in and the county seat of Carroll County, Illinois, United States. The population was 1,479 at the 2020 census.

== History ==
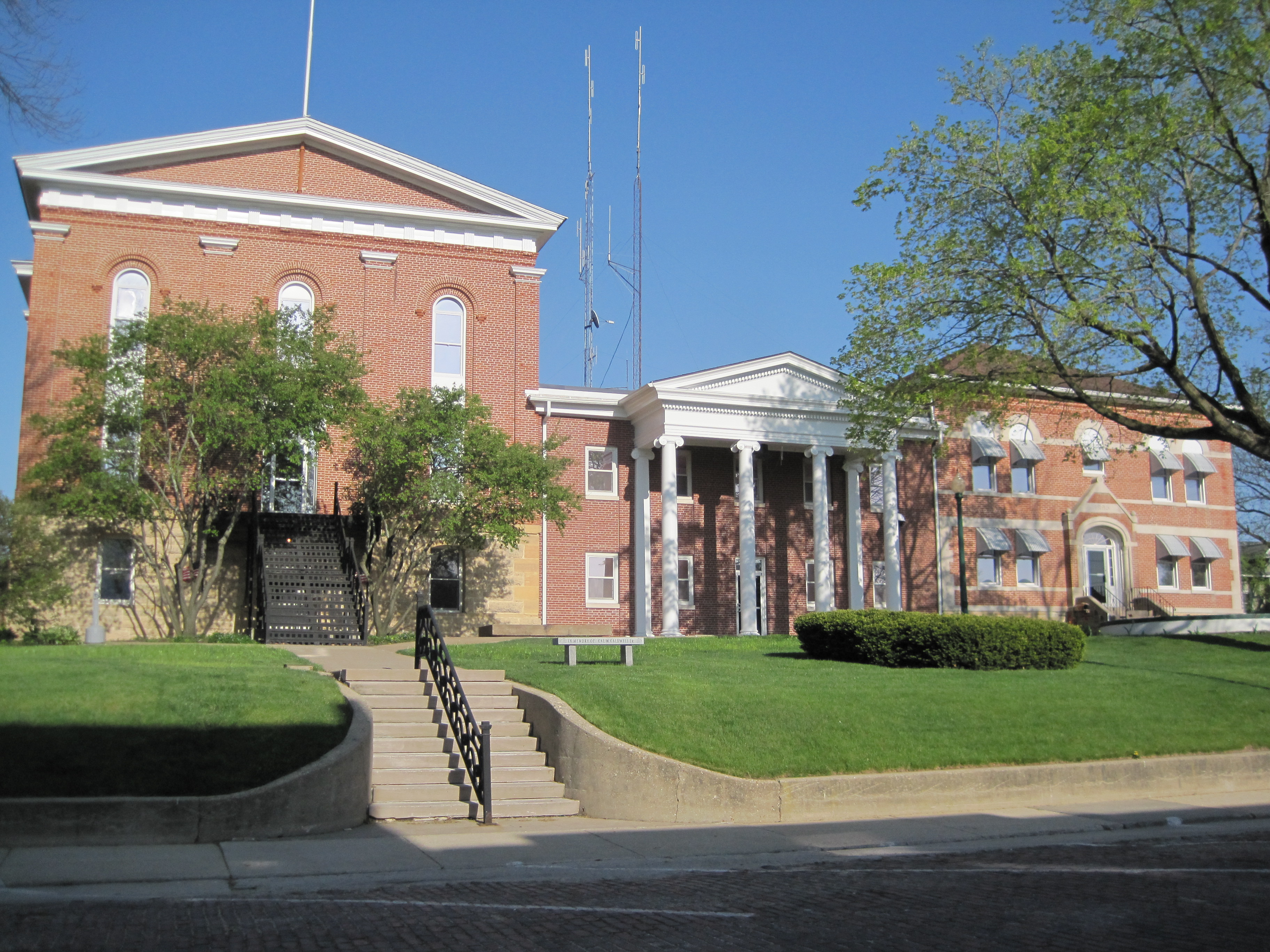
Carroll County Courthouse

Mount Carroll began as a mill town around 1841. In 1843, a referendum moved the county seat from nearby Savanna to Mount Carroll. The town was incorporated in 1855 and became a city in 1867; the first mayor was Nathaniel Halderman, a prominent local businessman and co-founder of the mill.

Shimer College was established in Mt. Carroll in 1853, but mounting debts forced a move to Waukegan in 1979 and subsequently to Chicago in 2006. The campus now is home to several organizations, most notably the Campbell Center for Historic Preservation Studies.

== Geography ==
Mount Carroll is located slightly northwest of the center of Carroll County. U.S. Route 52 passes through the southern part of the city, leading east 7 miles (11 km) to Lanark and west 10 miles (16 km) to Savanna on the Mississippi River.

According to the 2021 census gazetteer files, Mount Carroll has a total area of 2 square miles (5.18 km^{2}), all land.

=== Climate ===
Mt. Carroll has a humid continental climate (Köppen climate classification: Dfa), with cold winters, hot summers, and four seasons. Annual precipitation is about 40 inches.

Due to its elevation and northwesterly location, Mount Carroll is subject to unusually cold winter weather. From 1930 to 1999, Mount Carroll held the record for the lowest temperature ever recorded in Illinois, −35 °F (−37 °C), recorded on January 22, 1930. The record was beaten by Congerville in 1999, by one degree Fahrenheit. 20 years later, on January 31, 2019, during an extreme cold snap, Mount Carroll regained the title of coldest city in Illinois when a new Illinois state record low temperature of −38 °F (−39 °C) was officially recorded.

Climate data for Mount Carroll, Illinois (1991–2020 normals, extremes 1897–present)
Month	Jan	Feb	Mar	Apr	May	Jun	Jul	Aug	Sep	Oct	Nov	Dec	Year
Record high °F (°C)	61 (16)	73 (23)	85 (29)	92 (33)	104 (40)	104 (40)	108 (42)	103 (39)	99 (37)	91 (33)	79 (26)	69 (21)	108 (42)
Mean daily maximum °F (°C)	30.7 (−0.7)	35.3 (1.8)	47.5 (8.6)	60.6 (15.9)	72.3 (22.4)	81.7 (27.6)	84.9 (29.4)	83.3 (28.5)	76.9 (24.9)	63.9 (17.7)	48.5 (9.2)	35.8 (2.1)	60.1 (15.6)
Daily mean °F (°C)	20.8 (−6.2)	24.8 (−4.0)	36.6 (2.6)	48.2 (9.0)	59.8 (15.4)	69.4 (20.8)	72.6 (22.6)	70.7 (21.5)	63.3 (17.4)	51.1 (10.6)	38 (3)	26.4 (−3.1)	48.5 (9.2)
Mean daily minimum °F (°C)	10.9 (−11.7)	14.3 (−9.8)	25.7 (−3.5)	35.8 (2.1)	47.3 (8.5)	57 (14)	60.4 (15.8)	58.1 (14.5)	49.6 (9.8)	38.3 (3.5)	27.4 (−2.6)	17.1 (−8.3)	36.8 (2.7)
Record low °F (°C)	−38 (−39)	−36 (−38)	−16 (−27)	2 (−17)	15 (−9)	31 (−1)	35 (2)	32 (0)	14 (−10)	4 (−16)	−15 (−26)	−28 (−33)	−38 (−39)
Average precipitation inches (mm)	1.66 (42)	1.83 (46)	2.51 (64)	3.9 (99)	4.57 (116)	5.49 (139)	4.89 (124)	3.91 (99)	3.71 (94)	3.02 (77)	2.6 (66)	2.21 (56)	40.3 (1,020)
Average snowfall inches (cm)	10.2 (26)	7.9 (20)	3.6 (9.1)	0.8 (2.0)	0 (0)	0 (0)	0 (0)	0 (0)	0 (0)	0.4 (1.0)	1.7 (4.3)	8.8 (22)	33.4 (85)
Average precipitation days (≥ 0.01 in)	8.9	7.6	8.9	11.4	12.7	11.6	8.9	8.7	8.6	8.7	8.1	9.2	113.3
Average snowy days (≥ 0.1 in)	5.2	4.2	1.9	0.3	0	0	0	0	0	0.2	0.8	4.7	17.3
Source: NOAA

== Demographics ==
Historical population
Census	Pop.	Note	%±
1850	462		—
1860	1,323		186.4%
1870	1,756		32.7%
1890	1,836		—
1900	1,965		7.0%
1910	1,759		−10.5%
1920	1,806		2.7%
1930	1,775		−1.7%
1940	1,845		3.9%
1950	1,950		5.7%
1960	2,056		5.4%
1970	2,143		4.2%
1980	1,936		−9.7%
1990	1,726		−10.8%
2000	1,832		6.1%
2010	1,717		−6.3%
2020	1,479		−13.9%
U.S. Decennial Census

=== 2020 census ===
As of the 2020 census, Mount Carroll had a population of 1,479. The median age was 51.5 years. 16.0% of residents were under the age of 18 and 28.9% of residents were 65 years of age or older. For every 100 females there were 94.3 males, and for every 100 females age 18 and over there were 94.8 males age 18 and over.

The population density was 738.39 inhabitants per square mile (285.09/km^{2}). There were 812 housing units at an average density of 405.39 per square mile (156.52/km^{2}). There were 403 families residing in the city.

0.0% of residents lived in urban areas, while 100.0% lived in rural areas.

Among households, 20.7% had children under the age of 18 living in them. Of all households, 43.2% were married-couple households, 21.3% were households with a male householder and no spouse or partner present, and 26.0% were households with a female householder and no spouse or partner present. About 34.8% of all households were made up of individuals and 17.6% had someone living alone who was 65 years of age or older.

Of housing units, 17.2% were vacant. The homeowner vacancy rate was 2.2% and the rental vacancy rate was 21.2%.

Racial composition as of the 2020 census
Race	Number	Percent
White	1,408	95.2%
Black or African American	5	0.3%
American Indian and Alaska Native	0	0.0%
Asian	3	0.2%
Native Hawaiian and Other Pacific Islander	0	0.0%
Some other race	6	0.4%
Two or more races	57	3.9%
Hispanic or Latino (of any race)	42	2.8%

=== Income and poverty ===
The median income for a household in the city was $54,821, and the median income for a family was $62,788. Males had a median income of $42,396 versus $30,387 for females. The per capita income for the city was $27,966. About 6% of families and 10.3% of the population were below the poverty line, including 19.7% of those under age 18 and 5.5% of those age 65 or over.

== Arts and culture ==
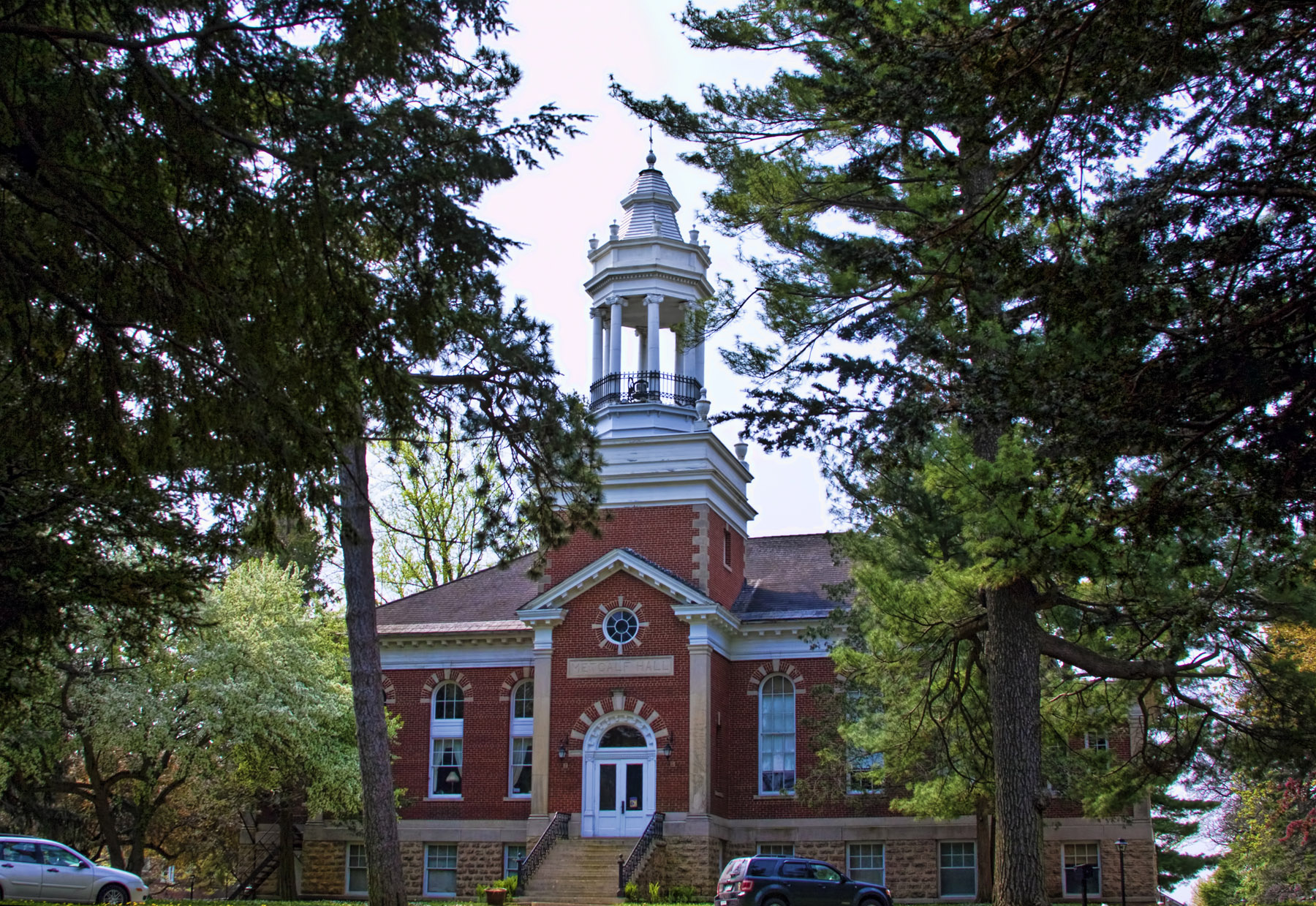
Metcalf Hall Shimer Campus-Campbell Center

Mount Carroll enjoys a remarkable concentration of historically and architecturally significant structures. The bulk of the town's downtown and older residential area are included in the Mount Carroll Historic District, which encompasses 118 acres (48 ha) and was entered into the National Register of Historic Places in 1980. Mount Carroll is also home to the Campbell Center for Historic Preservation Studies, located on the historic former Shimer College campus near the south edge of town.

The Timber Lake Playhouse, the oldest semiprofessional summer stock theater company in Illinois, is located 4 miles (6 km) southeast of Mount Carroll. The Mount Carroll post office contains an oil on canvas mural, Rural Scene - Wakarusa Valley, painted by Irene Bianucci in 1941. Federally commissioned murals were produced from 1934 to 1943 in the United States through the Section of Painting and Sculpture, later called the Section of Fine Arts, of the Treasury Department.

== Transportation ==
- U.S. Route 52 and Illinois Route 64 (concurrent with US 52), east towards Lanark, west towards Savanna and the Mississippi River
- Illinois Route 40, south towards Chadwick, Milledgeville and Sterling-Rock Falls
- Illinois Route 78, north towards Stockton, south towards Morrison

The former Milwaukee Road line from Chicago to Omaha runs through Mount Carroll.

== Education ==
Mount Carroll is in the West Carroll Community Unit School District 314.

== Notable people ==
- Neva Burright, Illinois harness racing driver and first woman to win a Grand Circuit race
- Samuel James Campbell, banker and philanthropist; born in Mount Carroll
- John L. Griffith, college coach, first commissioner of the Big Ten Conference
- Blanche Moore Haines, physician; Michigan State chair of the National Woman Suffrage Association; graduated Mount Carroll High School
- Felix A. Kremer, Wisconsin State Assemblyman; born in Mount Carroll
- Howard Kyle (née Vandergrift), actor, Union School class of 1879 valedictorian
- Suzanna W. Miles, archaeologist, anthropologist, ethnohistorian and Mayanist; born in Mount Carroll
- Ward Miller, outfielder for five Major League Baseball teams; born in Mount Carroll
- James Shaw, Illinois state representative, lawyer, judge, and geologist; practiced law in Mount Carroll
- Neta Snook, pioneer female aviator and aviation instructor
- Emmert L. Wingert, Wisconsin Supreme Court justice; born in Mount Carroll

== Photos ==
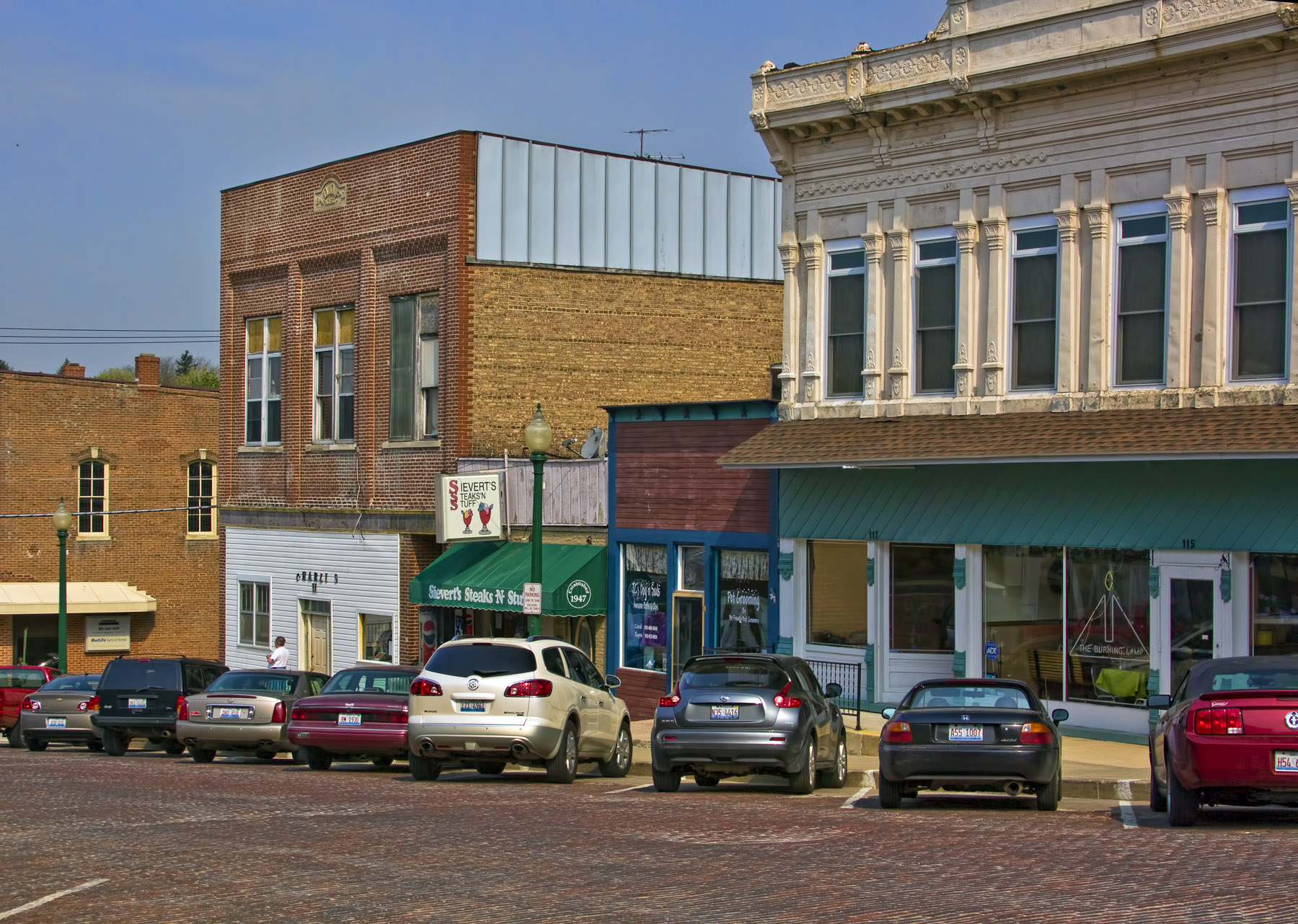
Downtown Market Street

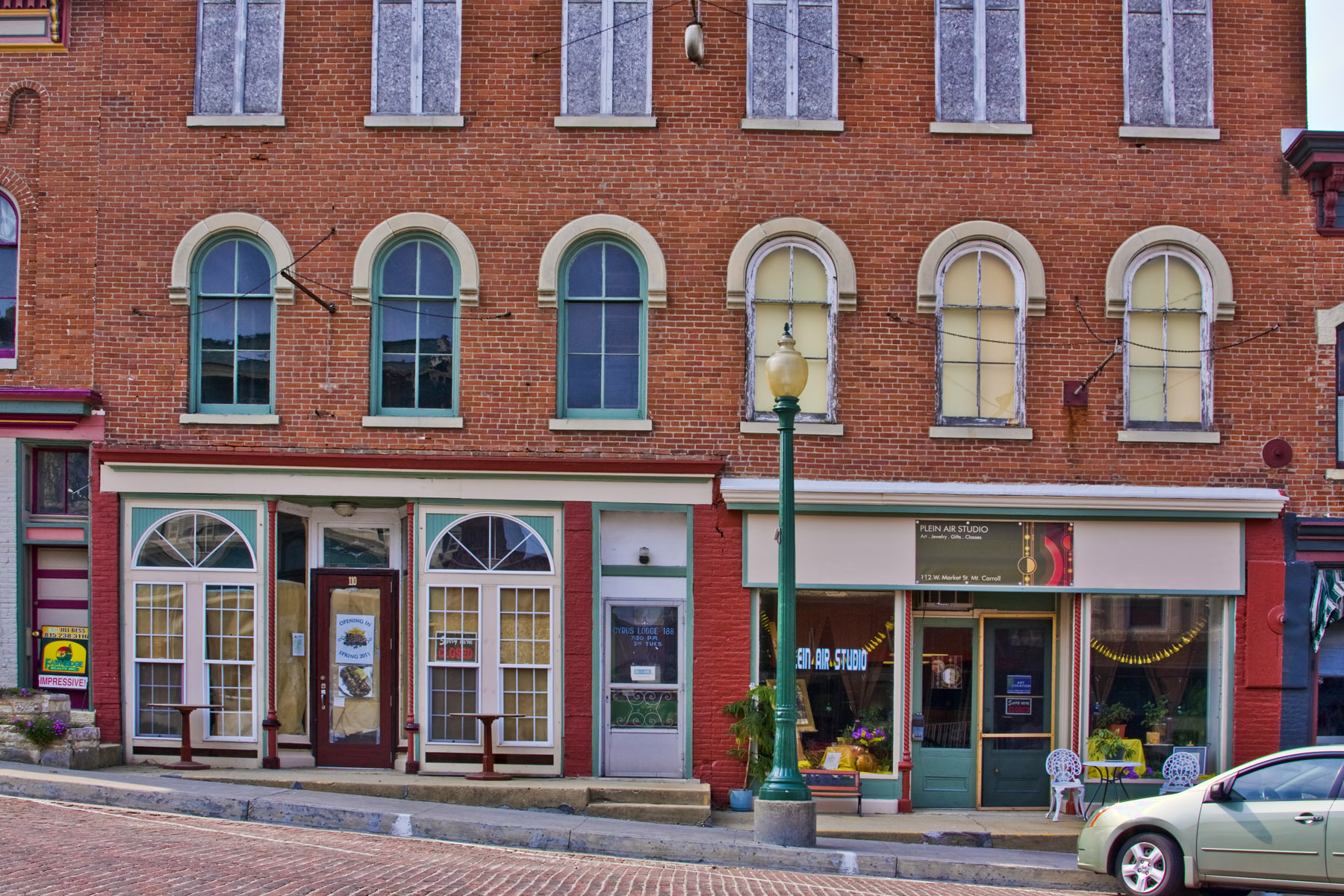
Downtown Market Street

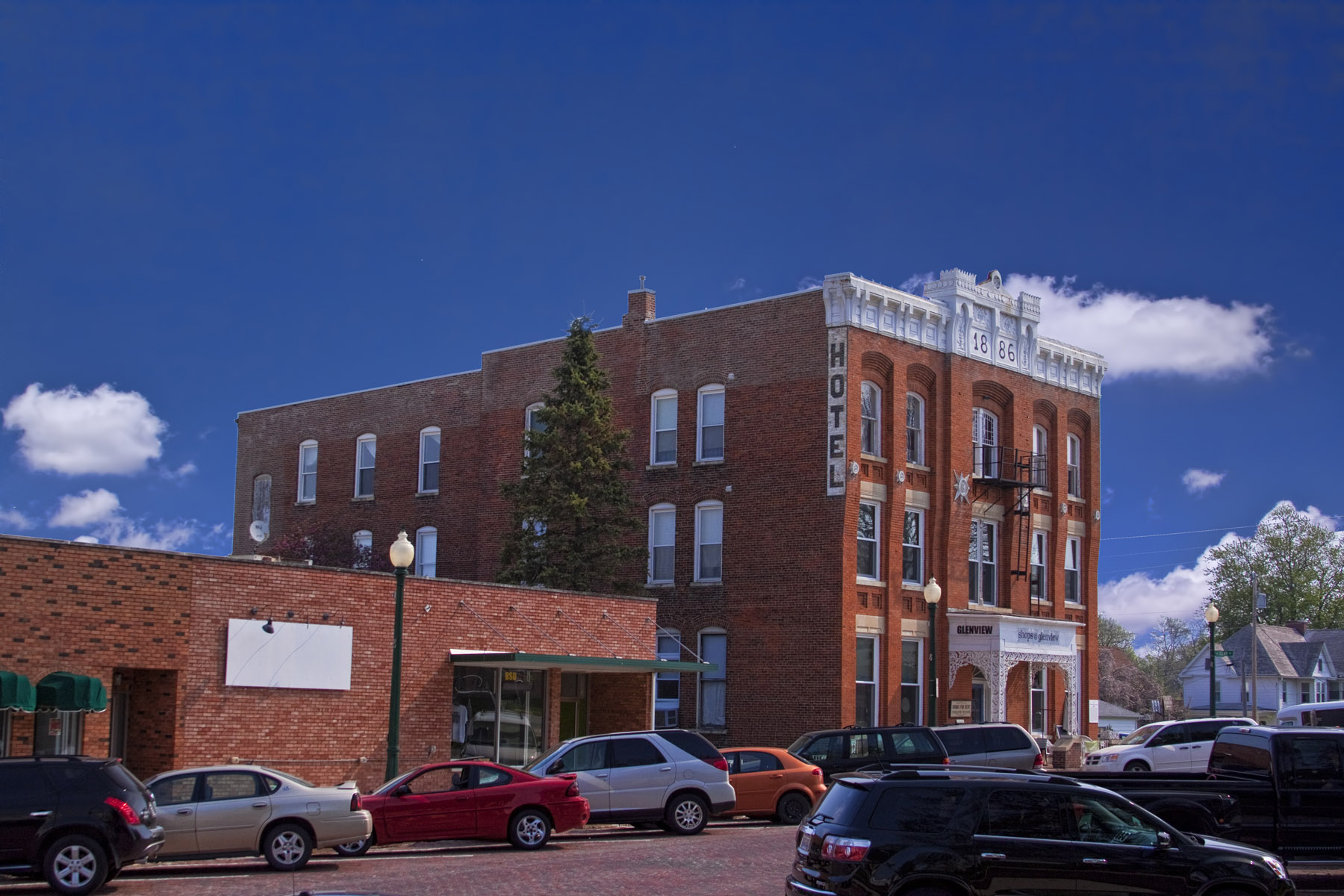
Downtown hotel

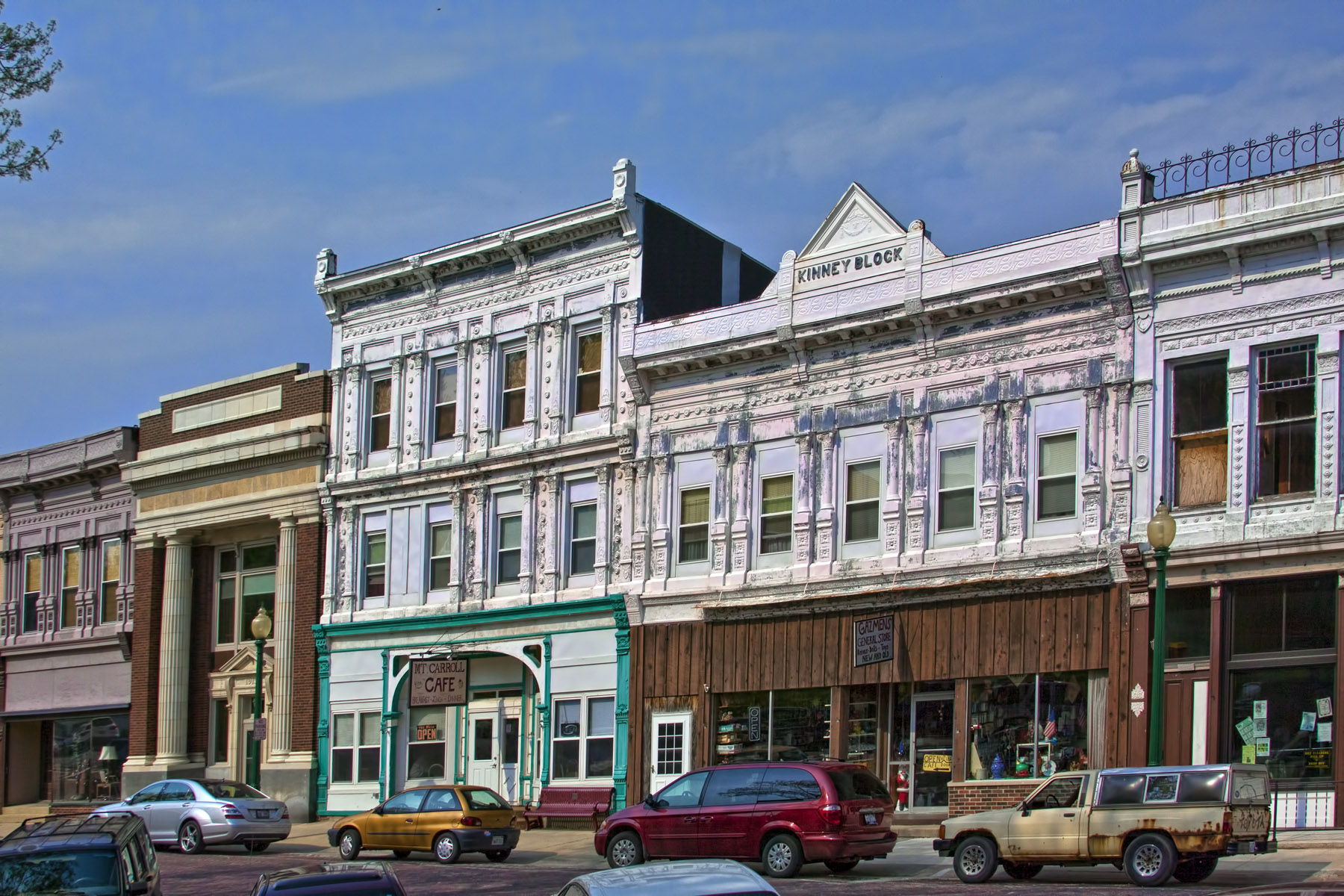
Downtown Main Street
