= List of Shimer College people =

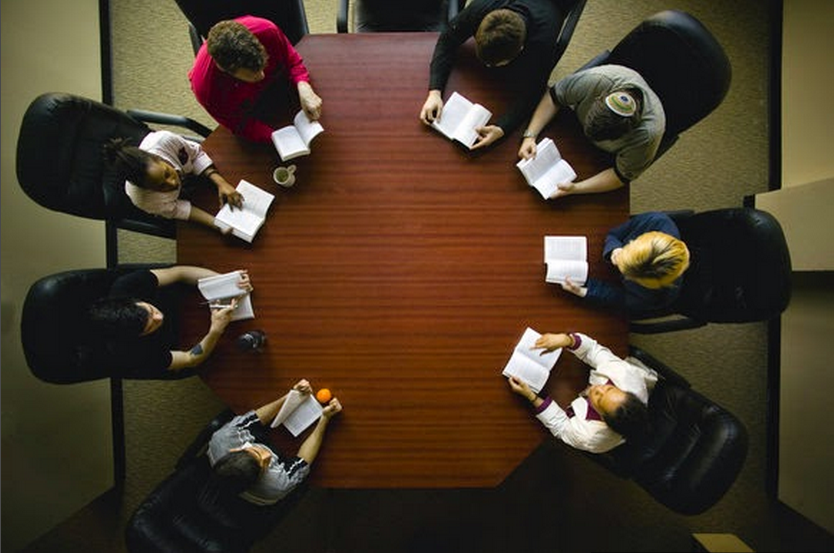
Shimer people in a Shimer class

This is a list of notable students and faculty of Shimer College, a Great Books college that was acquired in 2017 by North Central College.

Founded in 1853, Shimer occupied a traditional college campus in Mount Carroll, Illinois, from 1853 to 1978, and an improvised campus in Waukegan from 1979 to 2006. It then occupied a dedicated space on the Illinois Institute of Technology campus in Chicago since 2006. Small throughout its existence, Shimer enrolled 141 students as of 2012. As of 2008, Shimer had 5,615 living alumni. On June 1, 2017, the college became the Shimer Great Books School of North Central College.

The school was known for its Great Books curriculum, and also for its early entrance program, both of which have been in effect since 1950. Many on this list were early entrants.

== A ==
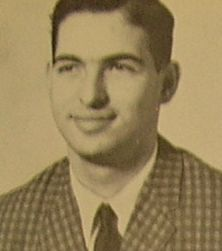
José Aybar

Name	Known for	Relationship to Shimer College	Citation
Stephen Abrams	Parapsychologist and drug law reform activist	1950s student	
José Aybar	President of Richard J. Daley College	1964 graduate	

== B ==
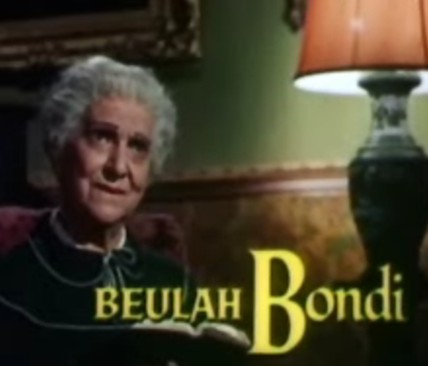
Beulah Bondi

Name	Known for	Relationship to Shimer College	Citation
Frederick C. Beiser	Scholar of German Idealist thought	1971 graduate	
John Bellairs	Novelist	1960s faculty	
Beulah Bondi	Film actress	1907 graduate	
Alice Braunlich	Classical philologist	1910s faculty	
Rachel Fuller Brown	Chemist and coinventor of nystatin	1920s faculty	
Carol Bruch	Legal scholar	1960 graduate	
Ron Bruder	Entrepreneur and founder of Education for Employment	1960s student	

== C ==
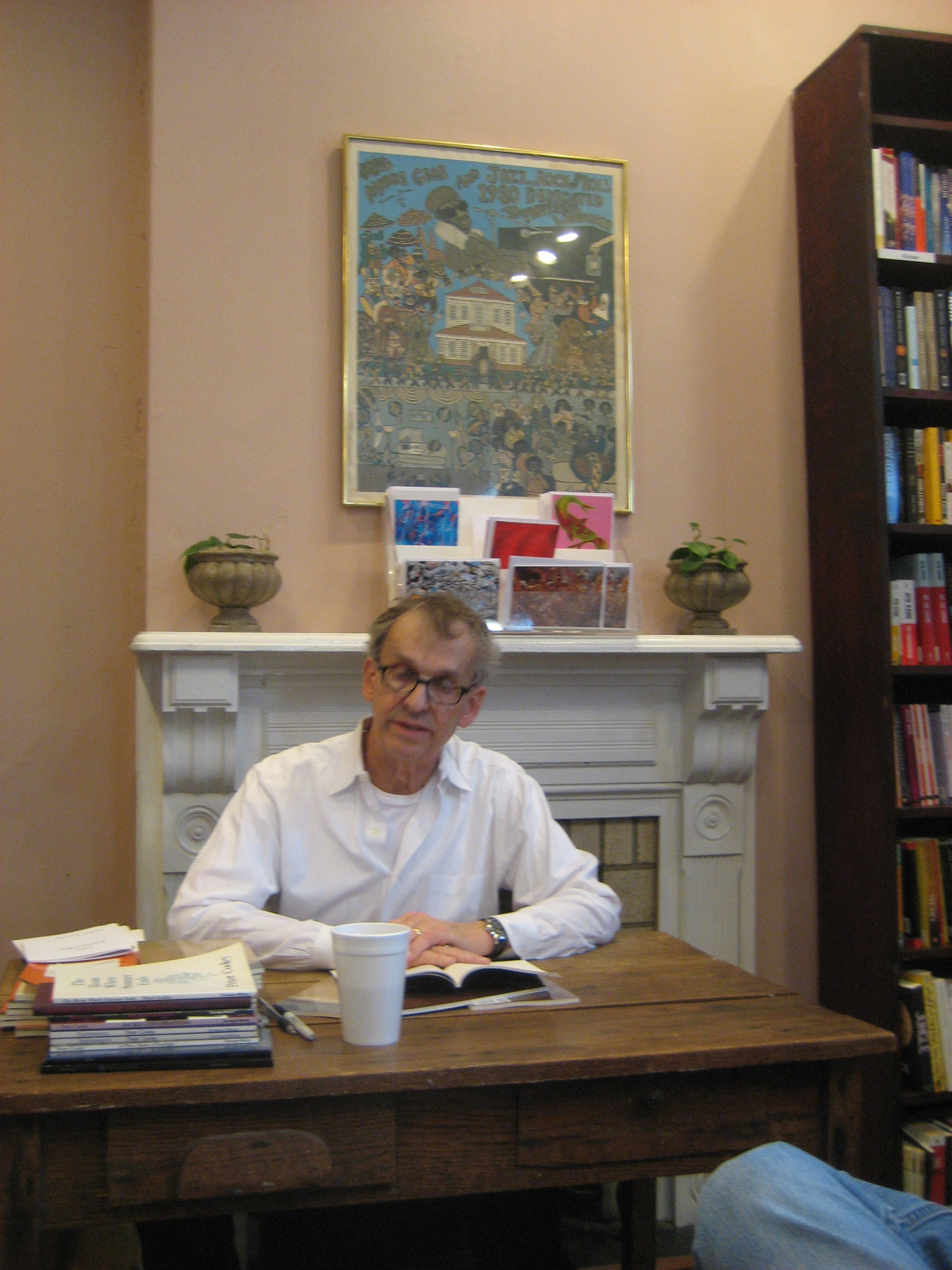
Peter Cooley

Name	Known for	Relationship to Shimer College	Citation
Samuel James Campbell	Businessman and philanthropist	1909 certificate, chairman of the board 1935–1956	
Lynda Caspe	Painter, sculptor and poet	1960s student	
Lisa Collier Cool	Author and journalist	1970s student	
Peter Cooley	Poet and professor of English at Tulane University	1962 graduate	
Heather Corinna	Author, sex columnist and activist	1990s student	
John Nathan Crouse	Dentist, organizer of patent litigation, and American Dental Association president	1860s student	

== D ==
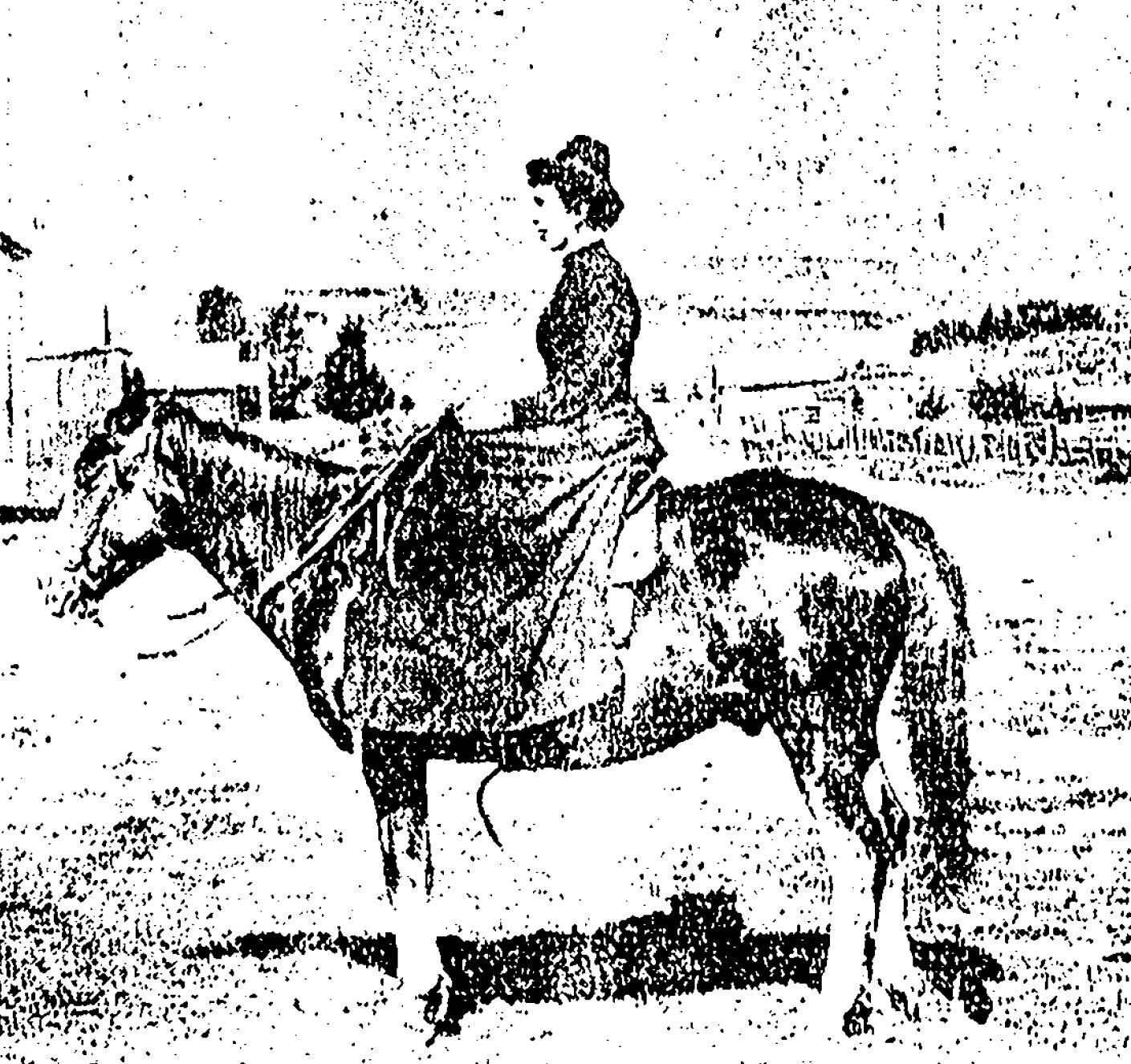
Virginia Dox

Name	Known for	Relationship to Shimer College	Citation
Bina Deneen	First Lady of Illinois, 1904–1912	1890 graduate; 1889–1890 faculty	
Stephen Dobyns	Poet and novelist	1960s student	
George W. Downs	Political scientist	1967 graduate	
Alan Dowty	International relations scholar	1959 graduate, 1966–1967 faculty	
Virginia Dox	Frontier educator, popular public speaker, key Whitman College fundraising agent	1875 graduate, 1875–1877 faculty	
Dale Dubin	Author of bestselling cardiology textbook	1950s student	

== E ==
Name	Known for	Relationship to Shimer College	Citation
Dorian Electra	Singer and video artist	2014 graduate	

== F ==
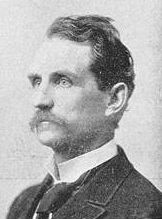
Virgil Ferguson

Name	Known for	Relationship to Shimer College	Citation
Virgil Ferguson	Member of the Illinois State Senate 1891–1895	1860s student	
Arthur Fine	Philosopher of science	1950s student	
Ken Friedman	Experimental artist and author	1966	

== G ==
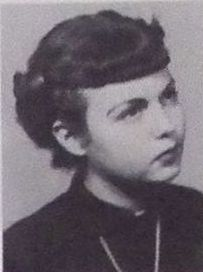
Sherna Berger Gluck

Name	Known for	Relationship to Shimer College	Citation
Robert H. Gray	Amateur astronomer and writer on SETI	1970 graduate	
Evelyn Greeley	Silent film actress	1900s student (disputed)	
Redd Griffin	Illinois state legislator	1960 graduate	

== H ==
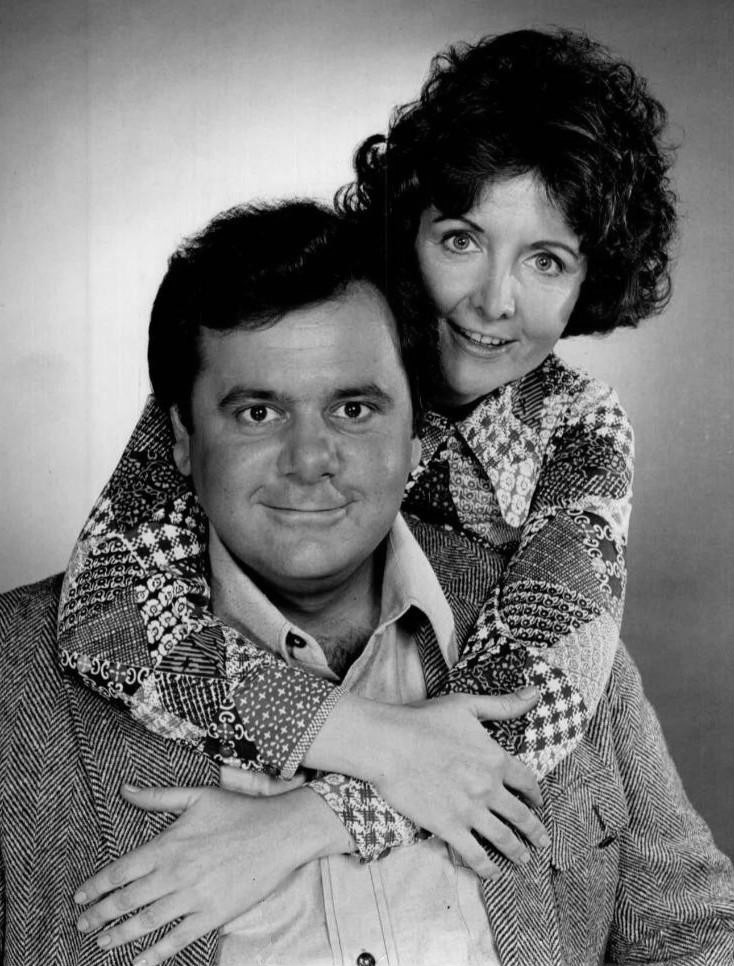
Mitzi Hoag

Name	Known for	Relationship to Shimer College	Citation
Henry Winfield Haldeman	Physician, banker and two-term mayor of Girard, Kansas	1860s student	
Mitzi Hoag	TV actress	1952 graduate	

== J ==
Name	Known for	Relationship to Shimer College	Citation
Randolph Jackson	New York Supreme Court justice and co-founder of Metropolitan Black Bar Association	1960s student	

== K ==
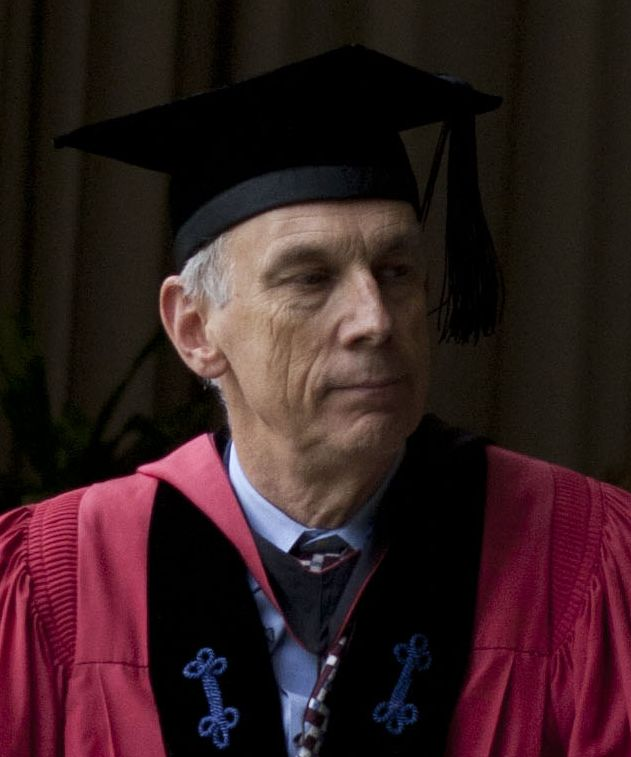
Robert O. Keohane

Name	Known for	Relationship to Shimer College	Citation
Robert Keohane	Professor of Political Science at Princeton University	1961 graduate	
C. Clark Kissinger	Political activist	1960s student	
Ken Knabb	Writer and translator	1965 graduate	
Penney Kome	Canadian author and journalist, editor of Straight Goods	1960s student	
Adam Kotsko	Writer on philosophy and popular culture	Faculty 2011–present	
Jesse Kraai	Chess Grandmaster	1994 graduate	
Jerome Kristian	Cosmologist and discoverer of quasar host galaxies	1953 graduate	

== L ==
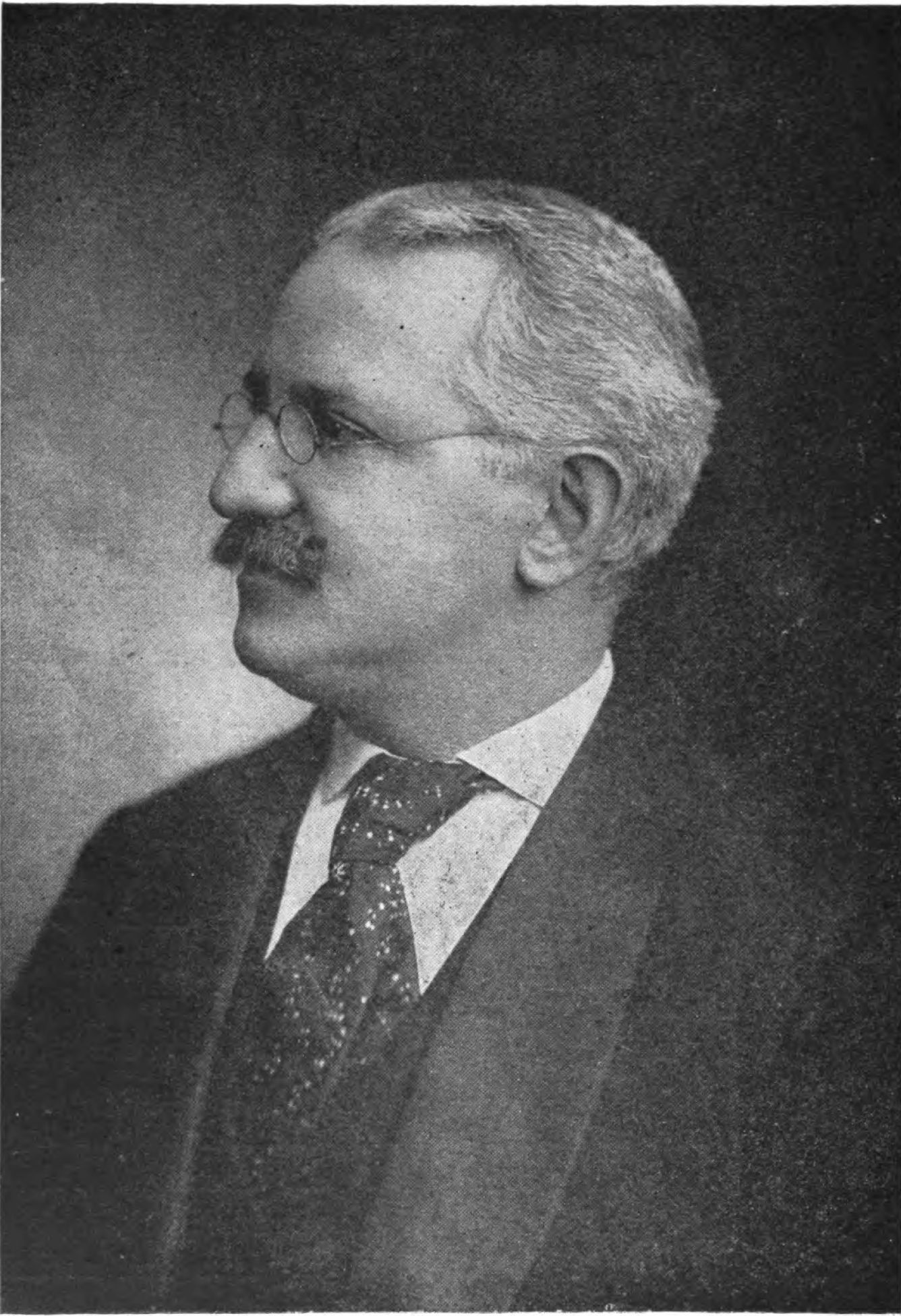
Emil Liebling

Name	Known for	Relationship to Shimer College	Citation
Jake La Botz	Musician and actor	1980s student	
Kevin Larmee	Painter in the East Village art movement	1960s student, 1990 graduate	
Emil Liebling	Pianist and composer	1900s faculty	
Thomas Locker	Artist and author	1970s faculty	

== M ==
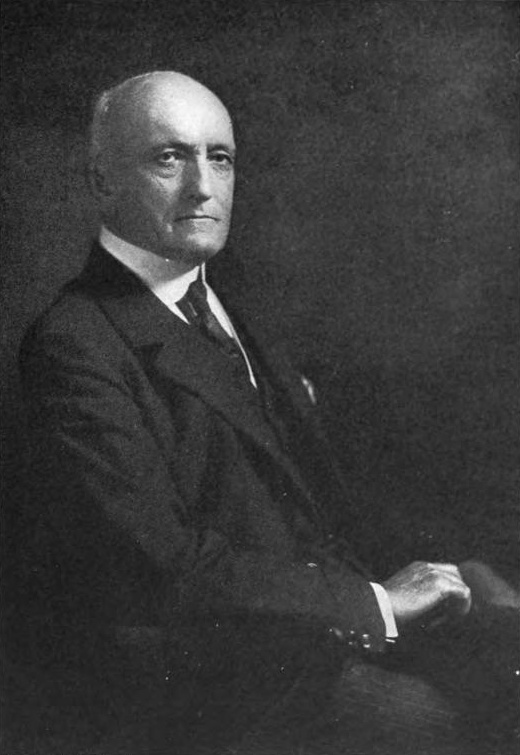
Samuel McCall

Name	Known for	Relationship to Shimer College	Citation
Gavin MacFadyen	Investigative journalist and documentary filmmaker	1958–1959 student	
Annie Marion MacLean	Sociologist	1894–1896 faculty	
John Norman Maclean	Author and journalist	1964	
Samuel W. McCall	Governor of Massachusetts	1864–1866 student	
Anne McKnight (Anna de Cavalieri)	Opera soprano	1943 graduate	
Suzanna Whitelaw Miles	Mayanist	1940–1942 student	
H.H.C. Miller	Early Evanston mayor and civic leader	1860–1864 student	

== N ==
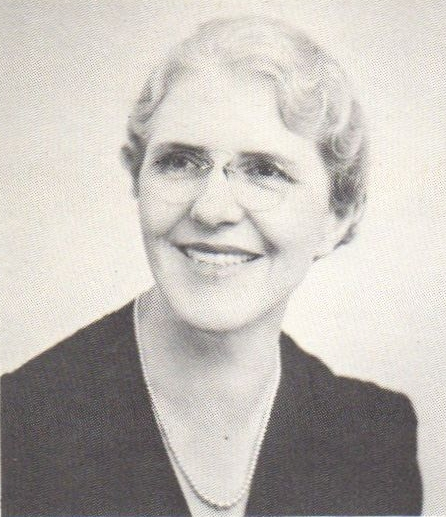
Mary Nourse

Name	Known for	Relationship to Shimer College	Citation
Debbie Nathan	Feminist journalist and writer	1960s student	
Henry Neikirk	Mine owner and Colorado state senator	1850s student	
Mary Nourse	Historian of China and co-founder of Jinling College	1899 graduate	
Jan Novák	Czech novelist and screenwriter	1970s student	

== O ==
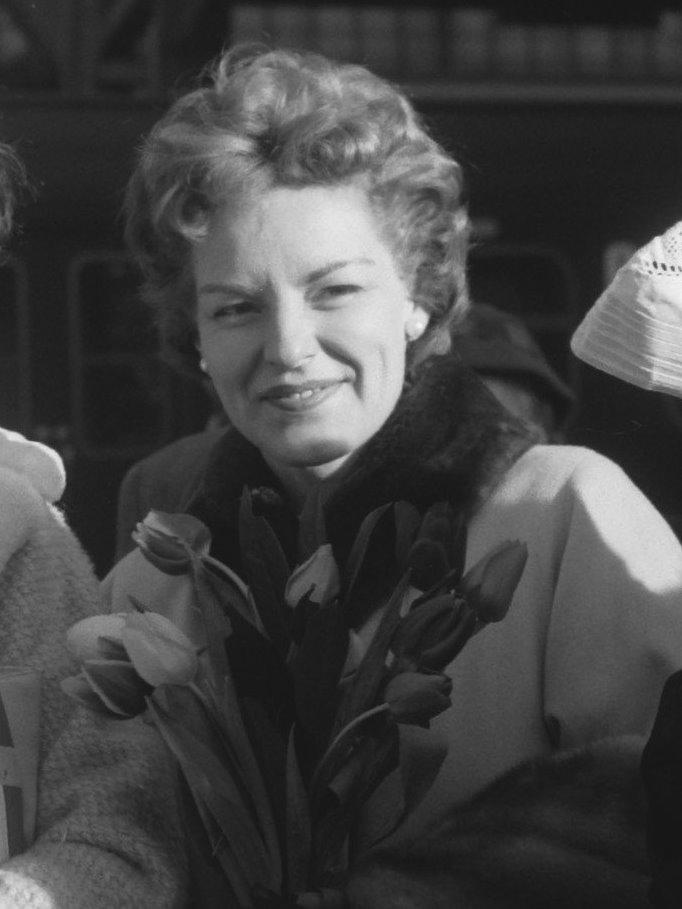
Jinny Osborn

Name	Known for	Relationship to Shimer College	Citation
Kenneth Olwig	Geographer	1967 graduate	
Jinny Osborn	Singer and founding member of The Chordettes	1945 graduate	

== P ==
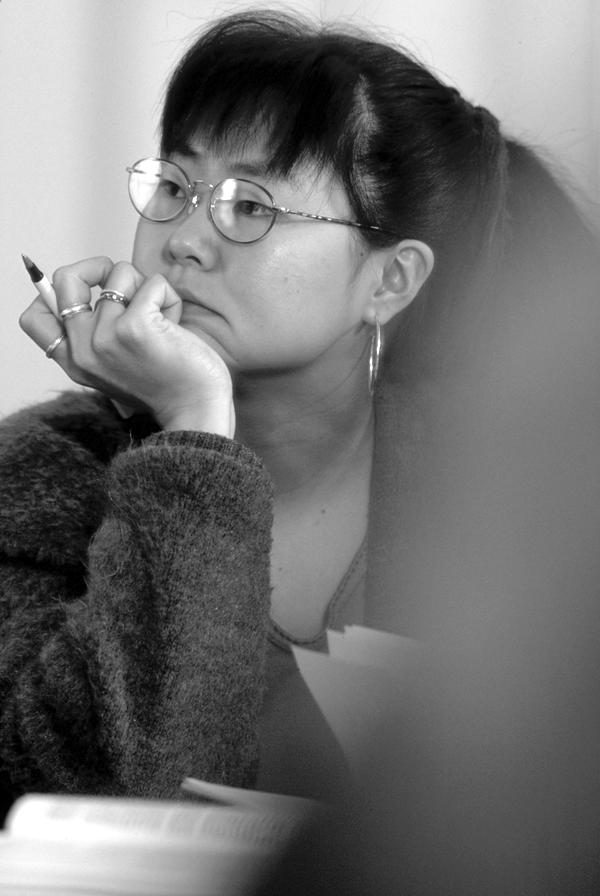
Mia Park

Name	Known for	Relationship to Shimer College	Citation
Mia Park	TV show host and actress	1995 graduate	
Theodore Pepoon	Nebraska state senator	1850s student	
Daniel Perlman	President of Suffolk University and Webster University	1954 graduate	
Nick Pippenger	Researcher in computer science	1965 graduate	
Frank Pooler	Choirmaster and choral instructor	1950s faculty	
Edwin Hartley Pratt	Homeopathic physician and inventor of "orificial surgery"	1864–1865 student	

== R ==
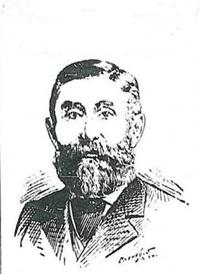
J. Morris Rea

Name	Known for	Relationship to Shimer College	Citation
J. Morris Rea	Iowa state senator	1850s–1860s student	
Jen Richards	Writer, actress, producer, and activist	2000s student	

== S ==
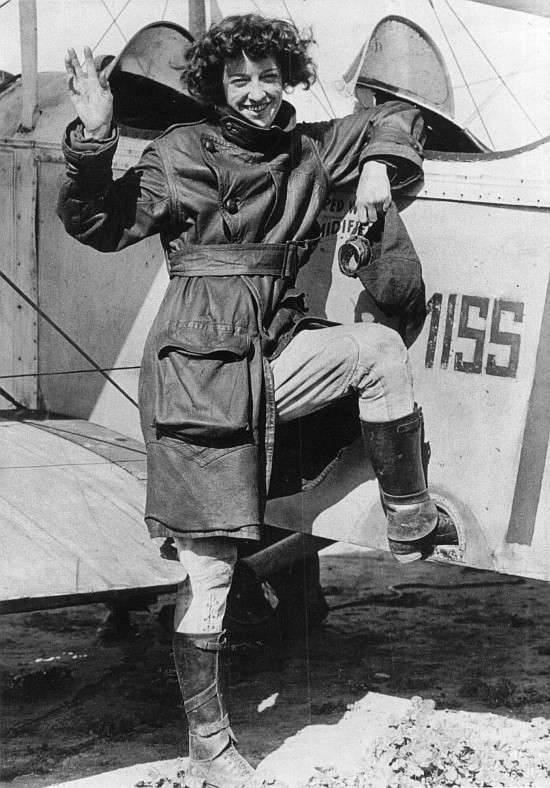
Neta "Snookie" Snook

Name	Known for	Relationship to Shimer College	Citation
Daniel J. Sandin	Computer graphics and visual arts pioneer	1964 graduate	
Ron Schultz	Florida State Representative	1950s student	
Frances Shimer	Educator; founder and principal of Mount Carroll Seminary, which later became Shimer College	Founder	
Henry Shimer	Entomologist and physician	19th-century faculty, husband of founder Frances Shimer	
Neta Snook	Pioneer aviator and teacher of Amelia Earhart	1912 graduate	
Phoebe Snow	Singer-songwriter	1970s student	
Laurie Spiegel	Composer and computer scientist	1967 graduate	
Sydney Spiesel	Pediatrician and clinical faculty at Yale University School of Medicine	1961 graduate	
Sarah Hackett Stevenson	First female delegate of the American Medical Association	1850s student	
Paula Stewart	Stage, film and television actress	1947	

== V ==
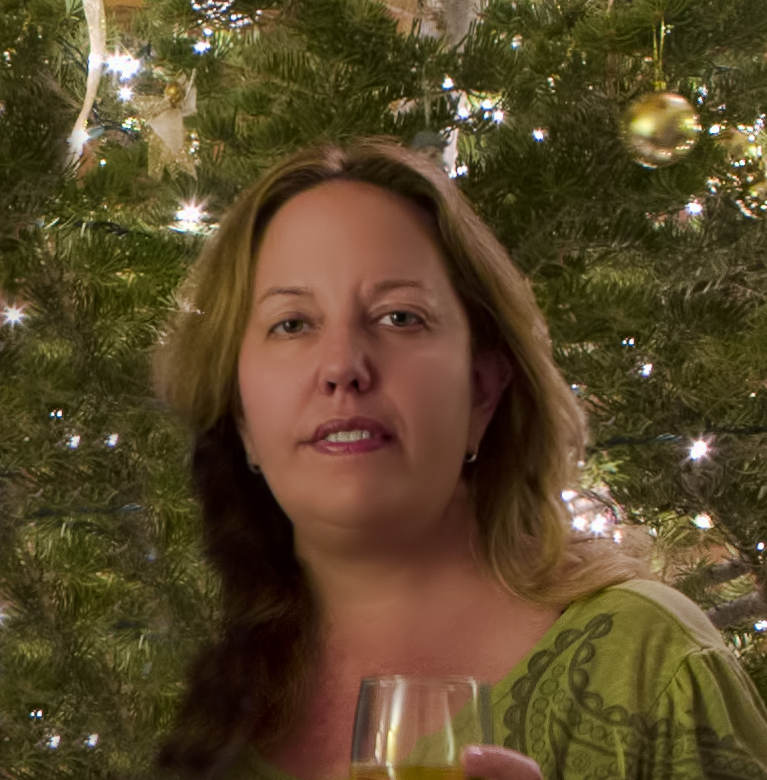
Elizabeth Van Wie Davis

Name	Known for	Relationship to Shimer College	Citation
Elizabeth Van Wie Davis	Asian studies scholar and administrator at Nazarbayev University	1977 graduate	
Elizabeth Vandiver	Classicist and classics educator	1976 graduate	

== W ==
Art by Mary Wings

Name	Known for	Relationship to Shimer College	Citation
David Weisburd	Criminologist	1970s student	
David Hilton Wheeler	Italian translator and Northwestern University and Allegheny College president	1850s faculty	
Lilian Whiting	Author and editor	19th-century student	
Mary Wings	Writer, artist, and musician	1960s student	
Roland Winston	Expert in nonimaging optics for solar energy	1953 graduate	

== Y ==
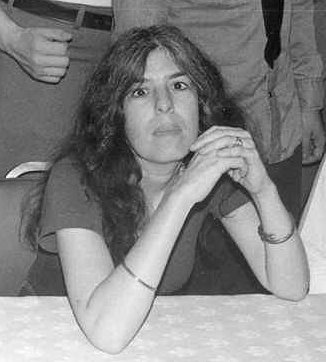
Cat Yronwode

Name	Known for	Relationship to Shimer College	Citation
Cat Yronwode	Comic book publisher and folklorist	1960s student	

== Works cited ==
- Shimer College (2000). Shimer College Faculty & Alum Directory 2000.
