= Neikirk =

Neikirk is a surname. Notable people with the surname include:

- Derick Neikirk (born 1974), American wrestler and baseball player
- Henry Neikirk (1839–1911), American gold miner, banker, and politician
- William Neikirk (1938–2020), American journalist, editor, and author

== See also ==
- Newkirk (disambiguation)
