= Caspe (surname) =

Caspe is a surname. Notable people with the surname include:

- David Caspe (born 1978), American film and television writer
- Lynda Caspe (fl. 1961), American painter, sculptor, and poet

== See also ==
- Casper (surname)
