= Plantationocene =

Theoretical anthropological framework

The Plantationocene is a proposed theoretical framework describing the ways in which the plantation system established in the Americas during early settler-colonialism continues to shape the world and the environment today. It was coined in conversation with several interdisciplinary scholars as a response to critiques of the existing proposed epochal names, specifically the Anthropocene and the Capitalocene. In contrast to the Anthropocene, it was not proposed as a scientific geological epoch but rather as a name for a transitional phase between epochs. The Plantationocene aims to explain human impact on the environment and global climate change as a result of social, political, and economic systems based on the plantation. Scholars point to monocrop agriculture, violent control and exploitation of labour, colonial land dispossession and transformation, transplanting of various species, racism, and prioritization of profit over human and non-human well-being as examples of logic inherent to the plantation which still shapes the modern world.

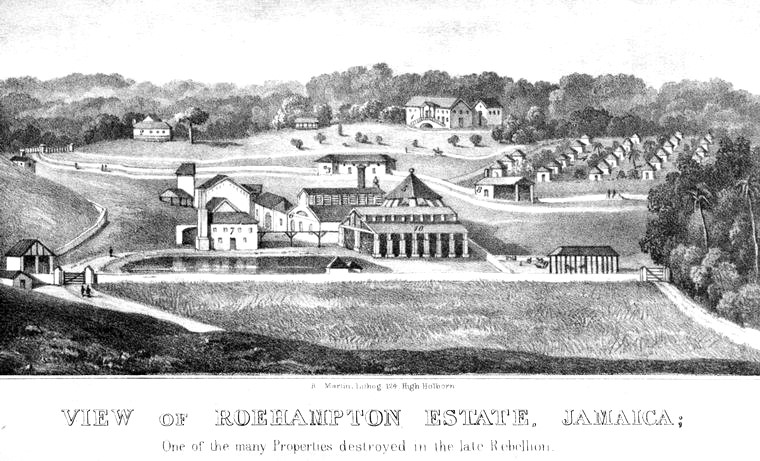
An artistic representation of the Roehampton Plantation and Slave Village in the Jamaica colony, 1825.

The Plantationocene has been adopted by some scholars, but remains somewhat controversial. Various academics have rejected it for differing reasons: some claim that any alternative to the Anthropocene is unnecessary, while others claim that the Plantationocene inadequately considers Black and Indigenous realities and scholarship on the lasting impacts of plantations, and some reject the -cene framings of modernity as a well-defined geological epoch entirely.

== Origin of the term Plantationocene ==
Plantationocene was coined in October 2014, during a recorded conversation between anthropologist Anna L. Tsing, feminist science and consciousness scholar Donna Haraway, cultural and landscape geographer Kenneth Olwig, anthropologist Noburu Ishikawa, and interdisciplinary biologist in epigenetics Scott Gilbert. The conversation was organized and facilitated by editor Nils Bubandt. The conversation discussed the idea of the Anthropocene, a proposed geological epoch which highlights the way human activity has impacted the global environment, as well as the alternative Capitalocene which centers capitalism as the core driver of climate change.

The Plantationocene was proposed as a potential addition. The term posits that the plantation system and its long-term impacts on politics, the economy, and society is the transition which resulted in the current level of global climate change, citing the fact that the plantation predates capitalism. However, Haraway et al. did not adopt the term as an outright replacement for other concepts—namely the Anthropocene, Capitalocene, or Chthulucene (also coined by Donna Haraway)—rather as a supplementary "story" with which to theorize about the current and past world.

== Plantationocene and other proposed -cene concepts ==
The Plantationocene was proposed not as an epoch in itself, but as a transitional period from the Holocene to the current era and what will come after it. Haraway et al. consider the Anthropocene and Capitalocene to equivalently represent transitions between epochs, and not geological epochs in themselves, though other scholars do not always share this opinion. No specific start date to the transition referred to by the Plantationocene has been proposed, unlike the Anthropocene. The Plantationocene exists in conversation with these and other proposed epochs or transitional stages which have taken on the -cene suffix.

The Anthropocene was the first proposed and has garnered the most public attention. The Anthropocene is also notable for being proposed by a natural scientist, whereas alternative epoch monikers have generally been suggested by social scientists, as well as for being the only -cene concept to be proposed as a legitimate addition to geological time scales. Many critics have taken issue with the term Anthropocene, claiming that it overly generalizes all humans as being equally responsible for/equally impacted by climate change. These critics claim that specific processes led by specific people, such as colonialism, capitalism, and/or industrialization, have caused the bulk of environmental change and that descriptors of the current time period should reflect this. Most other proposals for related concepts using the -cene suffix were born from these criticisms. One such proposal is the Capitalocene, coined by Andreas Malm and used by a number of Marxist climate scholars. This proposal aims to address criticisms that the Anthropocene places all of humanity at fault for climate change, instead centering the actions of capitalists and capitalist logic of infinite economic growth as the root cause for environmental damage. The Plantationocene in turn emerges from the Capitalocene idea, in an attempt to account for the fact that settler-colonialism, plantation agriculture, and chattel slavery all predate capitalism by most economic timelines.

Since the coining of the Anthropocene, Capitalocene, and Plantationocene, a number of other terms have been proposed, generally not as geological epochs but as theoretical frameworks adopting the -cene suffix. In addition to Plantationocene, Ferdinand uses the term Negrocene to describe the legacy of slavery and the importance of subjugated African labourers in creating the modern world. Donna Haraway developed the idea of the Chthulucene, which she states describes complex dynamics of kin and other relations between, within, and outside of species, naming a possibility of "flourishing for rich multispecies assemblages". Others have coined terms such as Anglocene or Oliganthropocene.

== Detailed overview ==
The Plantationocene encompasses the ways in which plantations, produced through colonialism and chattel slavery, continue to dominate the global social-political-environmental landscape, leading to widespread environmental degradation and global warming from greenhouse gas emissions. Malcolm Ferdinand proposes five fundamental aspects.

1. The Plantationocene refers to the globalization of a plantation economy, continuing into the modern day, which is characterized by unequal and unsustainable metabolic exchange and which includes factories and similar sites of non-agricultural production in addition to traditional plantations;
2. It centers the history of colonialism and slavery as what led to modern globalization and to the socio-ecological injustices which are called out by the Anthropocene and Capitalocene;
3. It analyzes geographical relations of power and consumption, emphasizing spatial relationships which recreate the plantation system such as how sites of production characterized by poor working conditions and/or ecological degradation are rarely the same place where products are consumed and wealth is accumulated;
4. It indicates the existence of a "plantation politics", meaning global political systems which are characterized by uniformity and assimilation, by racial, gender, and other social hierarchies, and by exploitation of labour;
5. It emphasizes disturbances to landscapes and reduction of biodiversity caused by plantations, highlighting non-human elements in analysis and critique of modern social-political-ecological organizations.

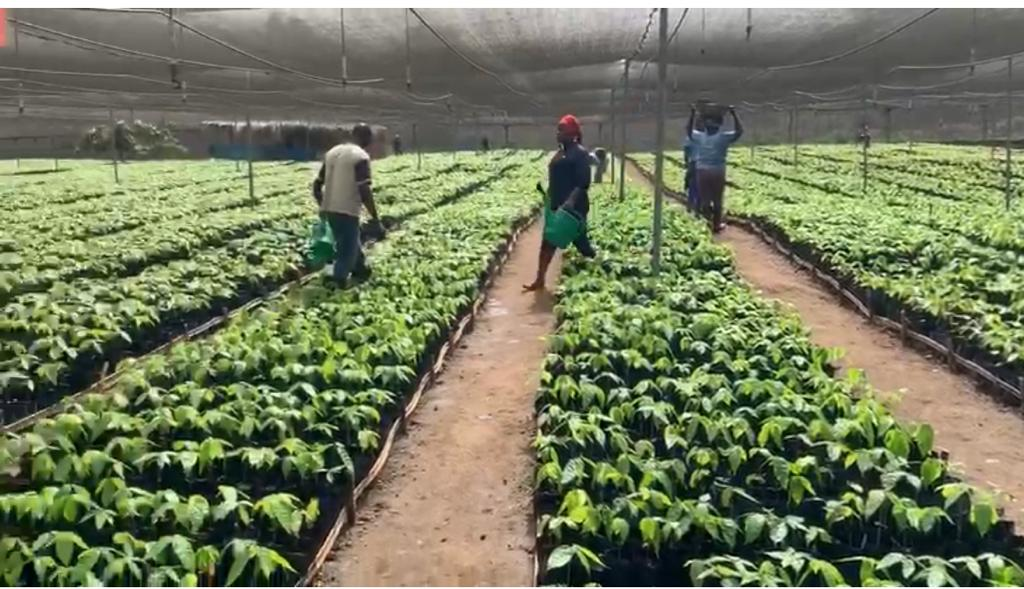
A cacao plantation in Sierra Leone.

The non-human element addressed in aspect five is a particularly core feature in early discussions around the Plantationocene. Haraway et al. discuss how the enforcement of uniformity onto indigenous landscapes and the transportation of plants and animals (including humans) create alienation from the land and facilitate long-distance investments in private property, which in turn allows for land transformation and degradation.

The uniformity of landscapes represented by the plantation is enforced by colonial forces with the aim of making land more familiar, controllable, and profitable. In the period of settler colonialism most commonly cited as beginning the Anthropocene/Capitalocene/Plantationocene, these colonial forces were white Europeans taking over the Americas, cutting down forests and otherwise transforming native landscapes in order to establish cash crop plantations of tobacco, sugar cane, cotton, etc.

Ferdinand refers to this process as "colonial inhabitation", or making colonized lands inhabited from a settler-colonial perspective; colonizers did not perceive indigenous residents as capable of inhabiting a place due to their supposed lack of civilization, and in order to render lands inhabited it was thought they needed to be altered into a form which the colonizers could more easily navigate and live in. The concept of settler-colonialism transforming land to the detriment of native people and species is also prevalent in indigenous climate justice studies. These land transformations are said to be conducted through a process of taking over the land, clearing it of trees and other native plants, and eliminating the indigenous population to the greatest extend possible. The Plantationocene points to the ways that settler-colonial modes of ecological governance which emphasize uniformity and/or the absence of indigenous populations continue to impact the world today, in modern monocropping agricultural practices as well as in other sectors such as factory meat production, widespread use of chemical pesticides and herbicides, or the creation of uninhabited nature preserves. Plantationocene scholars take a multispecies perspective, considering the similarities between the organization of land for profit and the organization of people for profit and positing that these structures are the root cause of modern climate change.

Another core feature of the Plantationocene is the way in which slavery was central to the development of capitalism, and the way the slavery system of colonial-era plantations in the Americas continues to impact social, political, and environmental structures. This aspect of Plantationocene scholarship is supported by a significant body of Black scholarship regarding modern echoes and recreations of the plantation which pre-dates Haraway's coining of the term. Plantations were run largely on the labour of enslaved Africans brought to the Americas, which some academics claim initiated an economic system based on violence and exploitation.

This concept is also addressed by the Marxist idea of racial capitalism, but plantation scholarship specifically emphasizes the geographical organization of the plantation and the interactions with non-human life as central to past and modern economies. Authors have suggested that the organization of plantations as "towns" has influenced the geography of modern towns and cities. Additionally, some theorists write that the subjugation and control of racialized people for the purposes of making profit is inextricable from the current global economic system.

Others point to the way that exploitation of people and land continue in plantation systems even when slavery is legally abolished. Sharecropping, ghettos or other impoverished and racialized urban environments, prison labour within the prison-industrial complex, etc. are all given as examples of how plantations are recreated in the modern era. However, the Plantationocene also sometimes models plantations as sites of resistance, proposing alternatives ways of navigating the world based on resistance and organizing by enslaved people, such as the alternative ecologies of slave gardens or the revolutionary character of maroon communities.

== Critiques ==
The Plantationocene and other proposed alternatives to the Anthropocene have been criticized for being unnecessary or "silly". Some scholars claim that despite its imperfections, the Anthropocene has value in that it draws attention to the detrimental impacts of certain human actions on the global environment and incites action in a way that other terms do not. Others represent models of modern life using the -cene suffix as inherently Eurocentric and thereby problematic.

The initial proposal of the Plantationocene by Haraway et al. has also drawn criticism for inadequately considering racial dynamics and Black scholarship on the plantation. Davis et al. discuss how their emphasis on multi-species considerations, at the expense of taking human considerations into account, ignores the way that slavery, racial struggle, and anti-Blackness specifically impacted plantation systems and the way they persist in the modern day. Critics point to significant existing publications regarding the long-lasting impacts of plantations on Black communities, which Haraway and her colleagues do not cite. Another example of this critique comes from Mythri Jegathesan, who takes a Black feminist perspective and posits that the quote by Noboru Ishikawa in the conversation when the Plantationocene was initially coined, "plantations are just the slavery of plants", limits the definition of the plantation and overlooks complex socio-political dynamics. She expands the argument to examine interspecies dynamics post-plantation with a specific focus on racial and caste considerations.

A similar argument has also been put forward with respect to Indigenous studies, claiming that the Plantationocene fails to address the impacts of the plantation on Indigenous peoples or engage with Indigenous scholarship. Many critics also posit that characterizing the current era as the Plantationocene restricts discussion and imaginings of alternative realities and modes of living which are being developed and practiced outside of plantation logics.
