= Kevin Larmee =

American painter

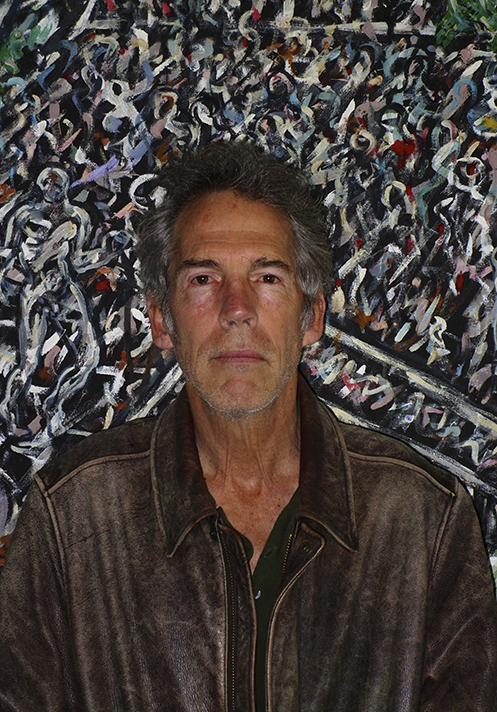
- Larmee in 2014
- Born: 1946 (age 79–80); Ridgefield Park, New Jersey
- Education: Shimer College; San Francisco Art Institute
- Known for: Painting
- Movement: Neo-expressionism; Street art
- Website: larmee.org

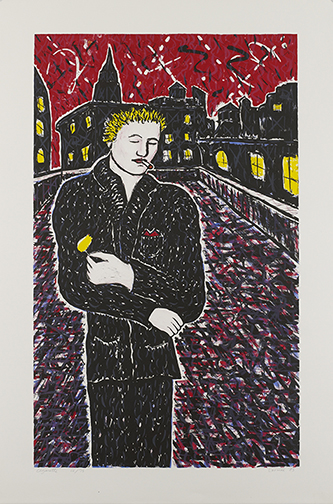
Cigarette Lithograph, 32" x 47", 1985 Brooklyn Museum

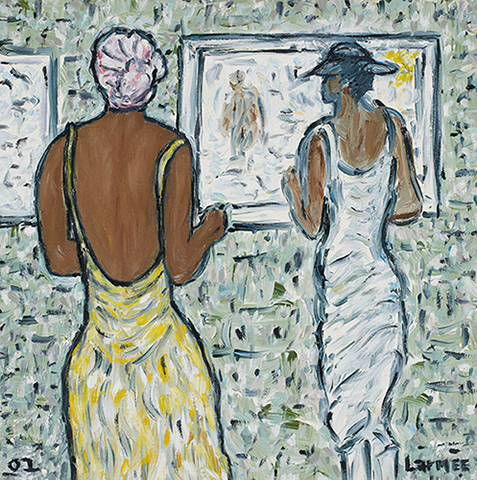
Two Ladies Oil on canvas, 20" x 20", 2002

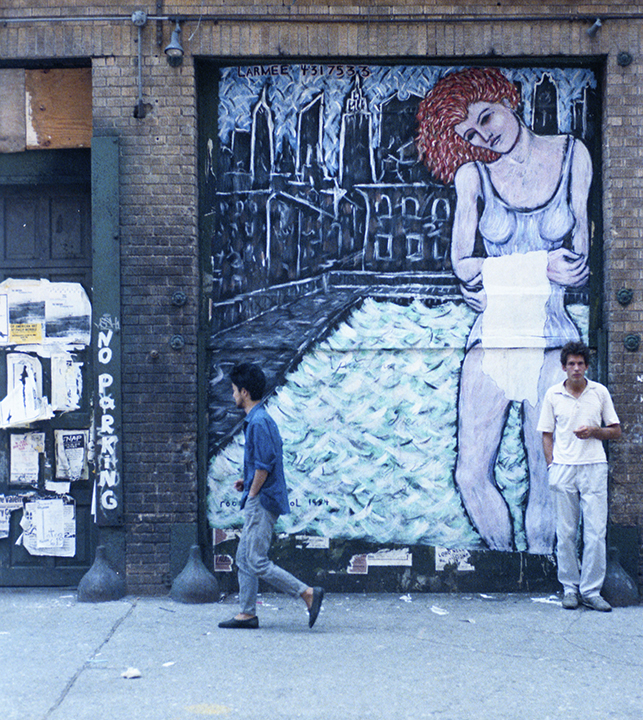
Rooftop Pool Acrylic on paper, glued to wall, 10' x 14', 1984, New York

Kevin Larmee (born 1946) is an American painter, best known for his association with the East Village art movement in New York City in the 1980s.

== Early life ==
Larmee was born in Ridgefield Park, New Jersey, and raised in a suburb of Chicago, Illinois. He attended Shimer College, then located in Mount Carroll, Illinois, from 1965 to 1967, attended the San Francisco Art Institute from 1967 to 1968, and returned to Shimer for the 1969-1970 academic year.

He and his wife, Susan Isono, moved to New York City in 1979, living in SoHo with their son, Blaise Larmee, who was born in 1985.

== Career ==
=== Painting ===
In the early 1980s, the art scene in New York City began to shift from the SoHo neighborhood to the grittier East Village, with the opening of many new galleries there. In 1984, feeling that his work was not getting enough attention from the art world, Larmee started pasting his large painted murals outdoors, in the middle of the night, on the walls of buildings mostly near art centers around Lower Manhattan. He would check in on them frequently for maintenance against the elements, and graffiti writers. The paintings would sometimes stay up for months before being removed or defaced.

Larmee soon began getting gallery exhibits in New York and elsewhere in the US, while continuing to create street art. Larmee became part of a movement of established gallery artists creating street art. He was represented by the Avenue B Gallery on the Lower East Side for several years in the 1980s. The gallery closed near the end of the decade. Larmee had prints in the Brooklyn Museum's 24th National Print Exhibition, Public and Private: American Prints Today, that traveled to various museums around the country in 1986. His 1985 lithograph Cigarette is part of the Brooklyn Museum's permanent collection, and he also has pieces in the permanent collections of the Grand Rapids Art Museum, Indianapolis Museum of Art and Toledo Museum of Art, among others.

In 1989, Larmee and his family moved to Chicago, where he continues to paint.

=== Style ===
Larmee's paintings of the 1980s were often set in nighttime urban environments, placing one or two solitary individuals on deserted streets or subway platforms, or in front of glowing bodies of water, juxtaposing the minimal figures with sharp colors and layers of patterns. His technique has been described as "loosely brushed and coarsely textured." The New York Times wrote in 1986 that his paintings of moments on a subway platform "vibrate with the concentrated energy of moving trains." Indicative of his street pieces is Blonde with Cigarette, which shows a man standing, holding a cigarette, his empty eyes staring at the ground, with the New York skyline behind him. Influenced by impressionism, his canvases were often heavily painted and textured, with flattened-out figures, and a controlled composition.

== Exhibitions (selected) ==
- White Columns, New York, NY, 1983
- Solo exhibition, Avenue B Gallery, New York, NY, 1984
- Micro Show, Now Gallery, New York, NY, 1984
- ABC No Rio, New York, NY, 1984
- Fashion Moda, New York, NY, 1984
- Sex, Sharpe Gallery, New York, NY, 1984
- New York, New Art, Vorpal Gallery, San Francisco, CA, 1985
- Solo exhibition, Avenue B Gallery, New York, NY, 1985
- Contemporary Visions '85, Zolla/Lieberman Gallery, Chicago, IL, 1985
- East Village, Fashion Institute of Technology, New York, NY, 1986
- Solo exhibition, Avenue B Gallery, New York, NY, 1986
- New York: East Village Exhibit, Lancaster, OH, 1986
- Solo exhibition, Giannetta Gallery, Philadelphia, PA, 1986
- Eight Urban Painters, Fine Arts Center Gallery of the State University of New York at Stony Brook, 1986
- Public and Private: American Prints Today, Brooklyn Museum, Brooklyn, NY; Flint Institute of Arts, Flint, MI; Rhode Island School of Design, Providence, RI; Carnegie Museum of Art, Pittsburgh, PA; Walker Art Center, Minneapolis, MN; 1986–87
- Solo exhibition, Signet Arts, St. Louis, MO, 1987
- Solo exhibition, Natalie Bush Gallery, San Diego, CA, 1987
- The Eccentric Landscape, Esther Saks Gallery, Chicago, IL, 1990
- Solo exhibition, Eastwick Gallery, Chicago, IL, 1997
- The Art of Democracy, Loyola University Museum of Art, Chicago, IL, 2008
