= John Nathan Crouse =

Dentist in Chicago, USA

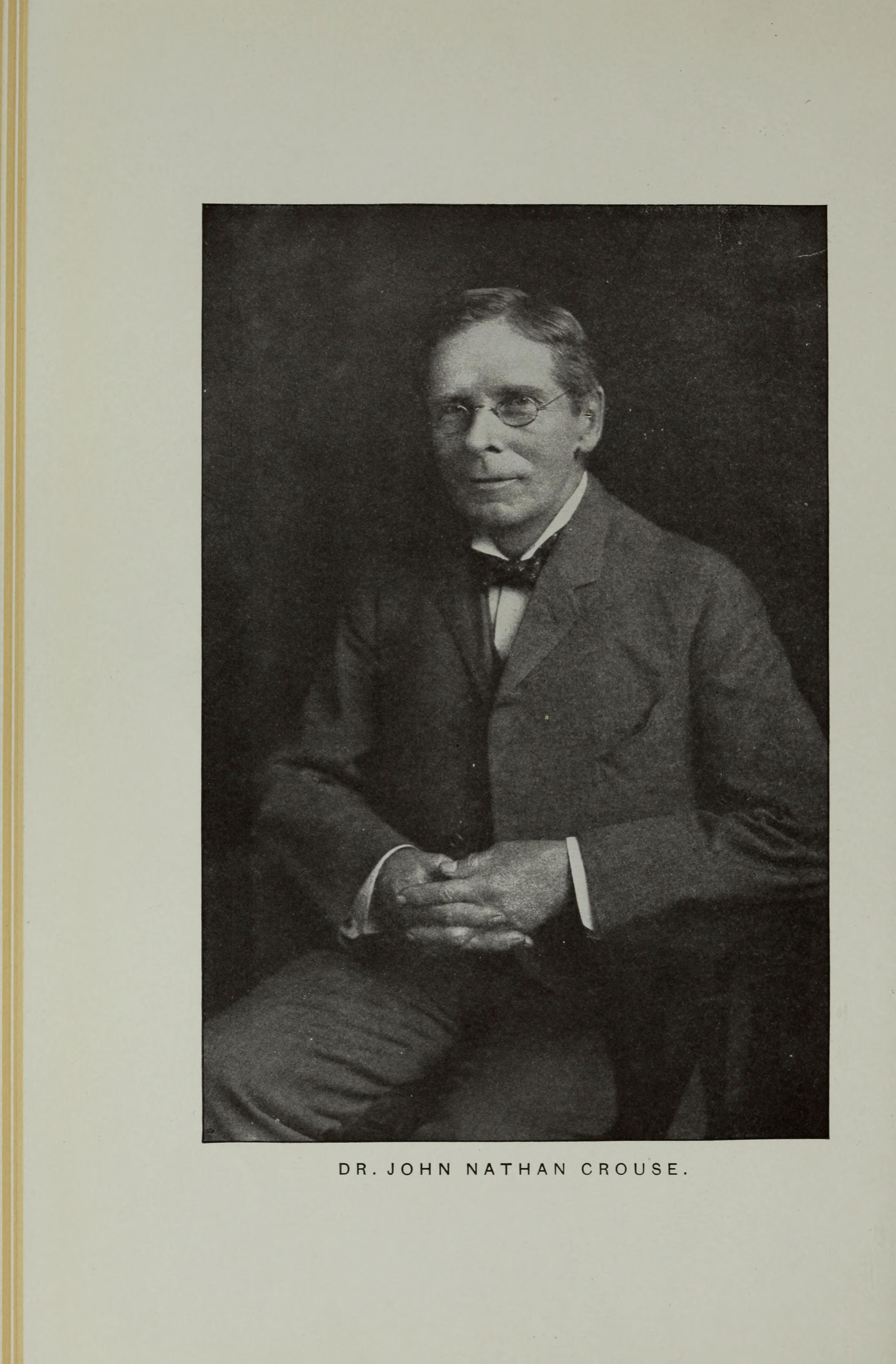
Dr. John Nathan Crouse

John Nathan Crouse (1842–1914) was a dentist in Chicago in the 19th and early 20th centuries, best known for his work organizing dentists to litigate against the use of patents on dental procedures. He was a charter member of the Illinois State Dental Society, and founded the Dental Protective Association, an organization that litigated against process patents in dentistry, serving as its president until 1913. He also served a term as president of the American Dental Association, then known as the National Dental Association.

== Early life and education ==
Crouse was born in Chester County, Pennsylvania, on September 15, 1842, the son of Daniel and Mary Crouse. He later moved with his parents to Mount Carroll, Illinois. He and his siblings first attended the common schools, and then the Mount Carroll Seminary (later Shimer College), where Crouse attended from 1859 to 1862.

Crouse practiced dentistry in Mount Carroll starting in 1864, then traveled to the Pennsylvania College of Dental Surgery, where he obtained his DDS in 1867.

== Professional career ==
Crouse first returned to Mount Carroll to practice, but moved to Chicago in 1868. Shortly thereafter he became one of the charter members of the state dental association.

== Dental Protective Association ==
In 1888, Crouse founded the Dental Protective Association (DPA) to protect against legal threats to the profession. From 1895 to 1908, the Association published the Dental Digest as its official organ.

The DPA was initially organized to defend against patent claims brought against dentists by the International Tooth Crown Company, which held patents on important improvements in crown and bridge work. The DPA defeated every patent suit it fought through at least 1900.

Criticism of the DPA arose in 1898 due to Crouse's having established a for-profit company with a very similar name, the Dental Protective Supply Company.

Deeper problems arose in 1910 over Dr. William Taggart's invention of a method of preparing gold inlay fillings. Although many dentists regarded the patents as an attack on the profession, others regarded Taggart's invention as worthy of patent protection. Crouse and the DPA joined the latter camp. The DPA set up a licensing scheme under which its members could send in $75 for a license on Taggart's machine and process, or $15 for the process alone.

The DPA's further inclusion of a provision in its bylaws forbidding members to contest the Taggart patent incensed many in the dental community. One group formed the National Dental Protective Association in 1909. Taggart's process patent was invalidated by the DC Court of Appeals in Boynton v. Taggart in 1912, dealing a further blow to the DPA's prestige.

== Death and legacy ==
Crouse died of heart failure on January 16, 1914. He was buried at Rosehill Cemetery in Chicago. The DPA remained in operation through at least 1922.
