= Randolph Jackson =

Randolph L. Jackson (born 1943) is an attorney, author and retired justice of the New York Supreme Court. He was a co-founder of the Metropolitan Black Bar Association, and was the longest-serving justice in the Civil Term of the Kings County Supreme Court, from which he retired in 2010. His writings include Black People in the Bible and How to Get a Fair Trial by Jury.

As of 2013, Jackson is of counsel for the firm of Okun, Oddo & Babat. He also serves as a hearing officer for National Arbitration and Mediation, which he joined in 2011.

== Early life and education ==
Jackson was born and raised in the Bedford-Stuyvesant neighborhood of Brooklyn, in New York City. He attended public schools there, culminating with Stuyvesant High School, before leaving for college.

For his college education, Jackson first attended Shimer College, a Great Books college in Illinois. Leaving Shimer in 1963, he transferred to New York University, where he graduated in 1965. He went on to obtain a JD at Brooklyn Law School, where he studied as a night student, and graduated in 1969.

== Legal career ==
Jackson passed the New York State Bar Exam in 1970. He subsequently worked for a year at Nixon Mudge Rose Guthrie Alexander & Ferdon, and from 1971 to 1981 was in private practice. He was elected president of the Bedford-Stuyvesant Lawyers Association in 1974.

Jackson began his judicial career in the Civil Court of New York City, where he served from 1981 to 1985, when he transferred to the criminal division. He was elected to the Kings County Supreme Court in 1987 and reelected in 2002. He retired in 2010, the longest-serving justice in the court's civil term.

Jackson was a co-founder of the Metropolitan Black Bar Association (MBBA). The MBBA was formed in 1984, replacing two previous African-American bar associations, the Harlem Lawyers Association and the Bedford Stuyvesant Lawyers Association. As a former president of the Bedford Stuyvesant association, Jackson played a key role in the merger.

In 1991, Jackson presided over a case that briefly gained national notoriety, when a suspect who had been falsely reported dead was discovered to have been alive—but only after he had actually been killed. It was later found that Jackson had issued a bench warrant for the suspect's arrest when the family failed to produce a death certificate, but the warrant had been "misdirected" and never served.

== Other activities ==
Jackson has remained engaged in the Bedford-Stuyvesant community throughout his life, including by providing mentoring to at-risk youth. He spoke out during his judicial career about the importance of mentoring as a way of both "serving" and "saving" the minority youth he otherwise finds himself sending to prison. He served for a time on the Board of Directors of the Navy Yard Boys and Girls Club, among other organizations.

Jackson has published two books, How to Get a Fair Trial by Jury and Black People in the Bible. How to Get a Fair Trial by Jury was published by We The People Press in Brooklyn, and presents a layman's guide to the process of jury selection for a criminal trial. A second revised edition was published in 2003. Jackson published Black People in the Bible via Vantage Press in 2002. In it, he argues that many figures in the Old Testament were in fact of African origin or descent, based on scriptural clues.

== Writings ==
- Black People in the Bible (2002)
- How to Get a Fair Trial by Jury: Picking the Jury in a Criminal Case (1978, 2003)
