= Cora Walker =

American lawyer (1922–2006)

Cora Thomasina Walker (June 20, 1922 – July 13, 2006) was an American lawyer. She was one of the first black women to practice law in New York.

== Biography ==
Walker was born on June 20, 1922, in Charlotte, North Carolina, to William and Benetta Jones Walker. Her parents separated when she was an adolescent, and she, her mother, and her eight siblings dependent on public assistance. When Walker graduated from James Monroe High School, she began to support her family with two jobs and at the same time enrolled in a six-year program at St. John's University in which students earned both a bachelor's and a law degree. She received her Bachelor of Science degree in June 1945. She graduated from the School of Law at St. John's University in 1946. She difficulty finding work after she was admitted to the New York State Bar in 1947, so she started her own practice in Harlem, where she represented residents in the neighborhood until her retirement in 1999. From 1976 to 1999, she was the senior partner in Walker & Bailey, a law firm which she established with her son. She ran for the New York State Senate in 1958 and 1964. In the 1950s or 1960s, Walker became The Harlem Lawyers Association's first female president. In 1970, The New York Times listed her as one of the most powerful people in Harlem. In 1988, Walker, then the chair of the National Bar Association Commercial Law Section, founded the Corporate Counsel Conference to connect corporations with the counsel of African-American attorneys. On January 25, 1992, she received an honorary Doctor of Laws from St. John's University. She also received a Medal of Honor from St. John's University on June 9, 2000.

Walker was married to, then divorced from, fellow lawyer Lawrence Bailey, with whom she had two sons, Lawrence Jr., and Bruce E. Bailey. Beginning in 2005, The National Bar Association Commercial Law Section began giving out an award honoring Walker.
