= Rapid Interpretation of EKG's =

1972 medical textbook

- Title page for Rapid Interpretation of EKG's (Third Edition)
- Author: Dale Dubin
- Language: English
- Genre: Medical
- Publication date: 1972

Rapid Interpretation of EKG's is a best-selling textbook for over 30 years that teaches the basics of interpreting electrocardiograms. It adopts a simplistic fill-in-the-blank style and is suited for medical students and junior residents. The book was written by Dale Dubin, M.D., a plastic surgeon and convicted felon, who has written several books on cardiology including Ion Adventure in the Heartland: Exploring the Heart's Ionic-Molecular Microcosm and Understanding Cardio-pulmonary Resuscitation.

The large yellow book was originally published in 1972; the sixth and most recent edition was published in 2000. In the fiftieth printing, the author hid within the copyright notice an offer to give his prized 1965 Ford Thunderbird (which was featured in several photographs in the book) to anyone who actually read the message and responded. Out of 60,000 copies in that printing, only 5 readers noticed and responded, and Dubin's own daughter delivered the car to the winner, a Yale medical student, as selected by a random drawing.
