= Lynda Caspe =

American painter, sculptor and poet

- Occupations: Painter, sculptor, and published poet

Lynda Caspe is a painter, sculptor, and published poet. She was a founding member of the Bowery Gallery in New York City in 1969. She was director of the Bowery Gallery from 2001-2010.

== Biography ==
Caspe majored in English at the University of Chicago, graduating with an AB in 1961. Prior to attending the University of Chicago, she studied at Shimer College, a small Great Books college then closely affiliated with the university, where she attended as an early entrant.

She then earned her MFA in painting at the University of Iowa. from 1964-1965 she studied at Atelier 17 with Stanley William Hayter in Paris, France. Returning to the United States, she then spent two years studying at the New York Studio School.

== Work ==
Caspe has shown at the Cooper Hewitt Museum, Museum of Biblical Art (Dallas Texas, 2015), Hebrew Union College Museum (New York City, 2015), The Derfner Judaica Museum, the Philadelphia Museum of Jewish Art, Gallery of the Borough President of New York, Scott Stringer, Phyllis Harriman Mason Gallery of the Arts Student's League, Westbeth Gallery and the Synagogue for the Arts, among other venues in New York City as well as at the Institute of Contemporary Art, London and the Museum of Contemporary Art, Oslo, Norway.

She is also adjunct associate professor at Borough of Manhattan Community College of the City University of New York, where she has taught since 1974. She has also taught at Parsons School of Design, the University of Alberta and the University of Chicago.

== Collections ==
Caspe's work is in the permanent collections of Poet's House, the University of Delaware, Yeshiva University Museum, Schering-Plough, John Hightower, former director of the Museum of Modern Art, The Derfner Judaica Museum and the Art Collection, the University of Iowa, the University of Iowa Stanley Museum of Art, University of Chicago, Columbia University and the National Gallery of Australia. The Smithsonian Institution Libraries also maintains a folder on her. Lynda Caspe is included in the Lucy Lippard Collection, Institute for Women & Art at Rutgers University, New Jersey and in the Library of Congress The Museum of Modern Art Library(Artist Book Collection), Metropolitan Museum of Art. Communications Workers of America. Jewish Federation of Greater Des Moines. The New York Public Library, The Museum of Women in the Arts(Library). The University of Iowa Library (Rare Book Collection), Fordham University.

== See also ==
- List of Shimer College people
