= Henry Neikirk =

American politician

Henry William Neikirk (1839–1911) was a Colorado gold miner, banker, and Republican politician, serving in the Colorado General Assembly from 1879 to 1881. He was also instrumental in establishing the University of Colorado.

== Early life and education ==
Henry William Neikirk was born to Manasses and Mary Neikirk in Elkhorn Grove, Illinois on November 27, 1839. After receiving a basic education from the local district school, he attended the Mount Carroll Seminary, later known as Shimer College, from 1858 to 1860. After leaving the Seminary, he read law with prominent local attorney William T. Miller. The legal profession evidently did not appeal to him, however, for in 1861 he headed west for the mountains.

== Business and political career ==
Upon his arrival in the West, Neikirk established the first trading post at Alkali, on the Platte River 230 miles east of Denver. The following year, he moved into the mountains as a prospector. During the ensuing years, he alternated between prospecting and working for wages in the mines. In 1867, he discovered the Hoosier Lode, although he had to wait until the 1870s before he had accumulated enough money to exploit it.

In 1868, Neikirk married Emily Virden. They had six children. Their eldest daughter, Fannie, also went on to attend her father's alma mater, the Mount Carroll Seminary.

Neikirk moved his residence to Boulder in 1875, remaining based there until his death. From 1875 to 1880, he operated the Melvina Mine near Salina, Colorado. The Melvina was regarded as "one of the very best" of the telluride gold ore mines in this period. The mine was discovered by Henry Merying and Neikirk was a close friend of his who was given a share in the mine before its value became known. His technical expertise was key to the mine's success. Neikirk and Meyeringlost their shares in a hostile takeover by the Scottish-Colorado Mining & Smelting Company in 1883.

In 1878, Neikirk stood for election as a Republican to the Colorado State Senate; he defeated the Democratic candidate by 400 votes despite a two-year organizing campaign by the Democrats. He served in the 2nd and 3rd general assemblies, from 1879 to 1881. In the 3rd General Assembly, he held the powerful chairmanship of the state senate's Finance, Ways and Means committee. In this capacity, he secured funding for the use of state militia against striking workers in the Leadville Miners' Strike.

The 1898 Colorado State Mining Directory lists Neikirk as the owner of the Freiburg Mine, located in Gilpin County; it had been developed to 2,500 feet. Other mines in which he had an interest included the Sunshine, Black Swan, Golden Sheen, Maveric, and Gold Farms mines.

In addition to being president or director of numerous mining companies, Neikirk also served for fourteen years as vice-president of the Boulder State Bank.

Neikirk died of heart disease at his home in Boulder, Colorado, on February 15, 1911.

== Works cited ==
- History of Clear Creek and Boulder Valleys, Colorado. Brookhaven Press. 1880. ISBN 9781581038583.
- "Hon. Henry Neikirk". Portrait and Biographical Record of Denver and Vicinity, Colorado. Chapman Publishing Company. 1898. pp. 170–176.
- Fossett, Frank (1876). Colorado:A Historical, Descriptive and Statistical Work on the Rocky Mountain Gold and Silver Mining Region.
- Twitty, Eric (2009). "Amendment to Metal Mining and Tourist Era Resources of Boulder County" (PDF). Archived from the original (PDF) on 2015-12-20.
