= Metropolitan Black Bar Association =

New York attorney association

The Metropolitan Black Bar Association (MBBA) is an association of African-American and other minority attorneys in New York City. As of 2012-2013, the president is Nadine Fontaine.

== History ==
The MBBA was founded on July 5, 1984, replacing two preexisting organizations, the Bedford-Stuyvesant Lawyers Association and the Harlem Lawyers Association. The leaders of these organizations, including erstwhile presidents Randolph Jackson and George Bundy Smith, are thus sometimes cited as co-founders of the organization.

The Harlem Lawyers Association, which had been the city's oldest black bar association, was founded in 1921. It drew particular national attention in the 1950s when Cora Walker became its first female president. The Bedford-Stuyvesant association was founded in 1933.
