= Elizabeth Vandiver =

American classical scholar (born 1956)

- Born: 1956 (age 69–70)

Academic background
- Education: Shimer College

Academic work
- Discipline: Classics
- Institutions: Whitman College

Elizabeth Vandiver (born 1956) is an American classical scholar. She is the Clement Biddle Penrose Professor of Latin and Classics Emerita at Whitman College, where she taught from 2004 to 2019. She received the Excellence in Teaching Award from the American Philological Association in 1998. She also won awards for her teaching from Northwestern University and the University of Georgia. In May 2013, she was awarded Whitman College's "G. Thomas Edwards Award for Excellence in Teaching and Scholarship", the highest award that Whitman College gives to a faculty member.

== Work ==
Vandiver did undergraduate work at Shimer College in Illinois where she enrolled as an early entrant at the age of 16, after completing tenth grade. She earned a B.A. degree in 1976, and then worked several years as a librarian. She received her Ph.D. from The University of Texas at Austin in 1990. Her dissertation was on Herodotus and was published as Heroes in Herodotus: The Interaction of Myth and History. In February 2010, Oxford University Press published her study Stand in the Trench, Achilles: Classical Receptions in British Poetry of the Great War. She has taught at the University of Maryland, Northwestern University, the University of Georgia, the Intercollegiate Center for Classical Studies in Rome, Italy, Loyola University New Orleans, Louisiana, and Utah State University.

== The Teaching Company ==
She has recorded several highly reviewed lecture series for The Teaching Company in the field of classical history and literature which include the following:

- Great Authors of the Western Literary Tradition (with other professors)
- Classical Mythology
- Odyssey of Homer
- Iliad of Homer
- Greek Tragedy
- Herodotus: The Father of History
- Aeneid of Virgil

== Books ==
- Heroes in Herodotus: The Interaction of Myth and History. Peter Lang, 1991.
- Luther's Lives: Two Contemporary Accounts of Martin Luther, translated and edited by Elizabeth Vandiver, Ralph Keen, and Thomas D. Frazel. Manchester University Press, 2003.
- Stand in the Trench, Achilles: Classical Receptions in British Poetry of the Great War. Oxford University Press, 2010/2013.
- Rupert Brooke, Charles Sorley, Isaac Rosenberg, & Wilfred Owen: Classical Connections. Co-authored with Lorna Hardwick and Stephen Harrison. Oxford University Press, 2024.
- Richard Aldington's Modernist Antiquity: Classics, Imagism, and the Great War, Oxford University Press, 2026.
