= Kenneth Olwig =

American-born landscape geographer

Kenneth Robert Olwig (born 1946) is an American-born landscape geographer, specializing in the study of the Scandinavian landscape. He is best known for advocating a "substantive" understanding landscape, one that incorporates legal and other lived significances of landscape, rather than viewing it in a more purely aesthetic way. His writings include The Meanings of Landscape: Essays on Place, Space, Nature and Justice (2019), Landscape, Nature and the Body Politic (2002) and Nature's Ideological Landscape (1984)

Olwig is a professor of landscape architecture at the Swedish University of Agricultural Sciences in Alnarp, Sweden, where he joined the faculty in 2002. He commutes to the university from Copenhagen, Denmark. He is married to anthropologist Karen Fog Olwig.

== Early life and education ==
Though she died at the time of my birth, my grandmother's Swedish presence was still felt in the meatballs my mother made. However, when asked I preferred to say I was Danish, like my mother's father, to avoid problems with the Norwegians. It didn't hurt, of course, that the name Olwig is Norwegian in origin.
—Kenneth Olwig

Olwig grew up in a Scandinavian neighborhood of Staten Island, New York. His father was sports editor for the Staten Island Advance.

Olwig left high school early to attend Shimer College, which for more than 50 years has offered an early entrance program for talented high schoolers ready to enter college early. He did a junior year abroad in Denmark, which he has credited with initiating him into "the core issues of Nordic identity", and graduated in 1967.

For graduate school, Olwig attended the University of Minnesota, where he completed a master's degree in Scandinavian language, literature, history and geography in 1971. Olwig has characterized the subject of his master's degree as "Scandinavian philology," and philological inquiry has remained a staple of his writing.

For his doctorate, Olwig transferred to the geography department, where his advisor was Yi-Fu Tuan. He completed his doctorate in 1977; his dissertation was titled "The morphology of a symbolic landscape: a geosophical case study of the transformation of Denmark's Jutland heaths circa 1750-1950."

== Academic and research career ==
From 1979 to 1983, Olwig worked in the department of landscape at the Danish Pedagogical University (DPU), now part of Aarhus University. From 1986 on, he has been formally on the faculty of the DPU, with periodic lengthy leaves of absence.

In 1984, Olwig published the influential Nature's Ideological Landscape, with an introduction by Yi-Fu Tuan. The book, an abridged version of Olwig's dissertation, was likened by environmental historian Alix Cooper to earlier works in environmental history by William Cronon and Roderick Nash.

From 1993 to 1996, Olwig worked at the Man and Nature Humanities Research Center at Odense University in Denmark, as a senior research fellow. He later also taught at the University of Trondheim in Norway.

In 1996, Olwig published an influential paper on "Recovering the Substantive Nature of Landscape", using his favored philological form of inquiry. In it, Olwig used the roots of the Germanic cognates of "landscape" to push back against the more aesthetic understanding of the term that had come to dominate in the literature. Observing that “a landskab was not just a region, it was a nexus of law and cultural identity”, Olwig argued that for contemporary geographers it is similarly “not enough to study landscape as a scenic text.” Drawing especially on the legal significance of landscape, Olwig pressed for a "substantive" approach to landscape, which he defined in this way:

By substantive, I mean "real rather than apparent" and "belonging to the substance of a thing," but also the legal sense of "creating and defining rights and duties" (Merriam-Webster 1961: substantive). In this context, I am also concerned with landscape as a "real" phenomenon in the sense that the "real" relates "to things in law," especially "fixed, permanent, or immovable things (lands tenements)" (Merriam-Webster 1961: real).

The paper produced a lively debate between Olwig and backers of more aesthetic flavors of cultural geography, such as Denis Cosgrove. Olwig's arguments have become a key part of the discourse on landscape within cultural geography, and are engaged with in many reviews of this field.

Olwig's second book, Landscape, Nature and the Body Politic, was published by University of Wisconsin Press in 2002; like its predecessor, it bore an introduction by Olwig's mentor Yi-Fu Tuan. The book was reviewed in at least six different journals, covering fields from cultural geography to environmental history. It was assessed by Denis Cosgrove as "by far the most sustained conceptual interrogation of landscape to appear in the past two decades." Cosgrove also, however, challenged the excessively smooth intellectual transitions in the sweeping work, pointedly likening the book to "an English Georgian estate landscape: easy progression, gentle transitions, rounded hills and vales without sudden breaks or sharp disruptions."

The cover design for Landscape, Nature and the Body Politic, which adapts part of the original cover of Hobbes' Leviathan, drew particular attention for highlighting the little-noticed role of landscape in that historically famous image.

In January 2002, Olwig joined the faculty of the Swedish University of Agricultural Sciences, teaching landscape theory and history, and commuting to Sweden from his home in Copenhagen. Olwig became a director of the Landscape Research Group in 2005. Since 2006, he has served as editor of several edited volumes on landscape geography, including Justice, Power and the Political Landscape (2007).

== Books ==
- Nature's Ideological Landscape (1984)
- Landscape, Nature and the Body Politic (2002)
- The Nature of Cultural Heritage and the Culture of Natural Heritage: Northern perspectives on a contested patrimony (2006, coeditor)
- Justice, Power and the Political Landscape (2007, coeditor)
- Nordic Landscapes : region and belonging on the northern edge of Europe (2008, coeditor)
- The Meanings of Landscape: Essays on Place, Space, Nature and Justice (2019)

== Works cited ==
- Cosgrove, Denis (2003). "Landscape, Nature, and the Body Politic: From Britain's Renaissance to America's New World by Kenneth Olwig". Geographical Review. 93 (1): 136–138. JSTOR 30033895.
- Olwig, Kenneth (2003). "In search of the Nordic landscape: A personal view". In Jan Ohman; Kirsten Simonson (eds.). Voices from the North: New Trends in Nordic Human Geography. pp. 211–232. ISBN 0754634256.
- Olwig, Kenneth R. (1996). "Recovering the Substantive Nature of Landscape". Annals of the Association of American Geographers. 86 (4): 630–653. doi:10.1111/j.1467-8306.1996.tb01770.x. JSTOR 2564345.
