= Newkirk =

Newkirk may refer to:

== People ==
- Alex Newkirk (1916–1996), American baseball player
- Anastacia Newkirk (born 1968), American singer-songwriter
- Au'Tori Newkirk (born 2007), American football player
- Don Newkirk (1966/67–2022), musician and record producer
- Floyd Newkirk (1908–1976), American baseball player
- Gordon Allen Newkirk Jr. (1928–1985), American astrophysicist
- H. Wirt Newkirk (1854–1946), American politician from Michigan
- Ingrid Newkirk (born 1949), British-American animal rights activist
- Jack Newkirk (1913–1942), American naval aviator
- Joel Newkirk (1896–1966), American baseball player, brother of Floyd
- Kori Newkirk (born 1970), American visual artist
- Makenna Newkirk (born 1995), American ice hockey player and coach
- Matthew Newkirk (1794–1868), American railroad executive
- Mike Newkirk (born 1986), American and Canadian football player
- Newton Newkirk (1870–1938), American humorist
- Robert Newkirk (born 1977), American football player
- Scott Newkirk (born 1961), US Virgin Islands swimmer
- Shavar Newkirk (born 1996), American basketball player
- Shelby Newkirk (born 1996), Canadian Paralympic swimmer
- Steven Newkirk (born 1957), US Virgin Islands swimmer
- Vann R. Newkirk II (born 1988), American journalist

== Places ==
- Newkirk, Oklahoma, a city in Oklahoma, United States
- Newkirk, Pennsylvania
- Newkirk Township, Michigan, a civil township in Michigan, United States
- Newkirk, New Mexico
- New York City Subway stations:
  - Newkirk Plaza, in Brooklyn at East 16th Street; serving the B and Q trains
  - Newkirk Avenue–Little Haiti, in Brooklyn at Nostrand Avenue; serving the 2 and 5 trains
- Newkirk Viaduct, former name of Gray's Ferry Bridge in Philadelphia, Pennsylvania
- Newkirk House, the oldest surviving building in Jersey City, New Jersey
- Newkirk Homestead, in upstate New York
