= Sydney Spiesel =

American pediatrician (born 1940)

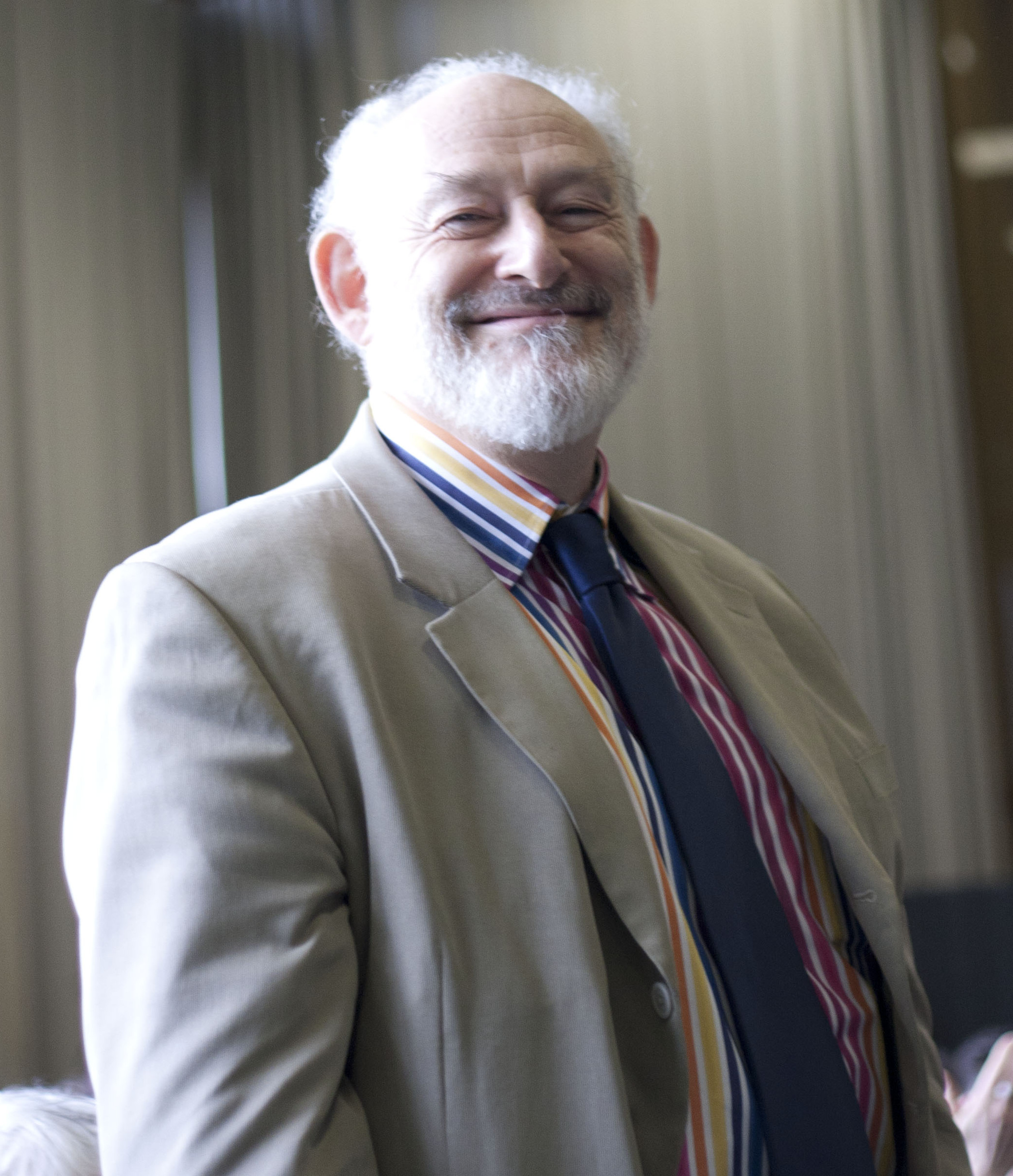
- Spiesel at Shimer College in 2012
- Born: Sydney Z. Spiesel; 1940 (age 85–86)
- Education: Shimer College; Yale University (MD, PhD)
- Occupation: Pediatrician

Sydney Z. Spiesel (born 1940) is an American pediatrician specializing in adolescent medicine on the clinical faculty of the Yale University School of Medicine.

Spiesel is a regular commentator for Slate magazine and National Public Radio. He is married to legal professor and author Christina O. Spiesel.

== Education ==
For his undergraduate work, Spiesel attended Shimer College, then located in Mount Carroll, Illinois. He enrolled through the school's early entrance program, which since 1950 has allowed students to matriculate who have not received a high school diploma. He graduated from Shimer in 1961.

Spiesel received his M.D. and Ph.D. from Yale University in 1975.

== Career ==
Spiesel has for many years operated a busy pediatrics practice in New Haven, Connecticut.

Spiesel is the inventor (US 5997847) of a shampoo that makes lice eggs (nits) fluoresce under ultraviolet light, so making them more visible.

In 2012, Spiesel was named one of the first three Shimer alumni to receive the school's Alumni Service Award.
