= Dale Dubin =

American plastic surgeon and author

Dale Dubin (born 1940), is a former American plastic surgeon and author of several cardiology textbooks, though never practicing or being trained as a cardiologist.

Dubin practiced medicine in Tampa, Florida, and gained fame within the medical community with the 1972 publication of Rapid Interpretation of EKG's, a best-selling textbook suited for medical students and junior residents. In it, Dubin adopts a simplistic fill-in-the-blank style to teach the basics of reading electrocardiograms. In the fiftieth printing of the book, he hid within the copyright notice an offer to give his prized 1965 Ford Thunderbird to anyone who actually read the message and responded. Out of 60,000 copies in that printing, only 5 readers noticed and responded, and Dubin's own daughter delivered the car to the winner (selected by a random drawing). Dubin also wrote Adventure in the Heartland: Exploring the Heart's Ionic-Molecular Microcosm and Understanding Cardio-pulmonary Resuscitation.

In 1986, Dubin, age 46, was arrested and pled guilty to charges related to child pornography and cocaine. He was sentenced to five years in prison and his Florida medical license was revoked. Dubin served three years and was released in December 1989.

In addition to his medical work, Dubin was for a time an avid hibiscus grower; a variety ("Dragon's Breath") he developed won Hibiscus of the Year in 1999. Dubin owns a patent on a Hibiscus plant he cultivated, named "Hoosiers." The flowers are white with a dark red border. He has also been a collector of gemstones, and in 1972 he created what was then the world's largest gem, the "Brazilian Princess" topaz valued at $1 million, by repeated radiation treatments of a 9.5- pound topaz that he had purchased for $600. The stone now resides in the American Museum of Natural History.
