= Shimer Great Books School =

American democratic school

- Former names: Mount Carroll Seminary, Frances Shimer Academy, Frances Shimer Junior College, Shimer College
- Type: Great Books-focused academic department
- Established: 1853
- Parent institution: North Central College
- Location: Chicago, Illinois; 41°49′55″N 87°37′33″W
- Website: www.northcentralcollege.edu/program/shimer-great-books-school/liberal-studies

Shimer Great Books School (/ˈʃaɪmər/ SHY-mər) is a Great Books college that is part of North Central College in Naperville, Illinois. Prior to 2017, Shimer was an independent, accredited college on the south side of Chicago, originally founded in 1853.

Originally founded as the Mount Carroll Seminary in Mount Carroll, Illinois in 1853, it became affiliated with the University of Chicago in 1896 and was renamed the Frances Shimer Academy after founder Frances Wood Shimer. It was renamed Shimer College in 1950, when it began offering a four-year curriculum based on the Hutchins Plan of the University of Chicago. After the University of Chicago parted with both Shimer and the Hutchins Plan in 1958, Shimer continued to use a version of that curriculum. The college relocated to Waukegan in 1978 and to Chicago in 2006. In 2017, it was acquired by North Central College which established the Shimer Great Books School to continue offering its curriculum.

Shimer was, until joining North Central College, governed internally by an assembly in which all community members had a vote. In 2016, Shimer announced an agreement to be acquired by North Central College. The agreement came into effect on June 1, 2017, when Shimer's faculty and curriculum were subsumed into North Central as a department known as the Shimer Great Books School of North Central College.

== History ==
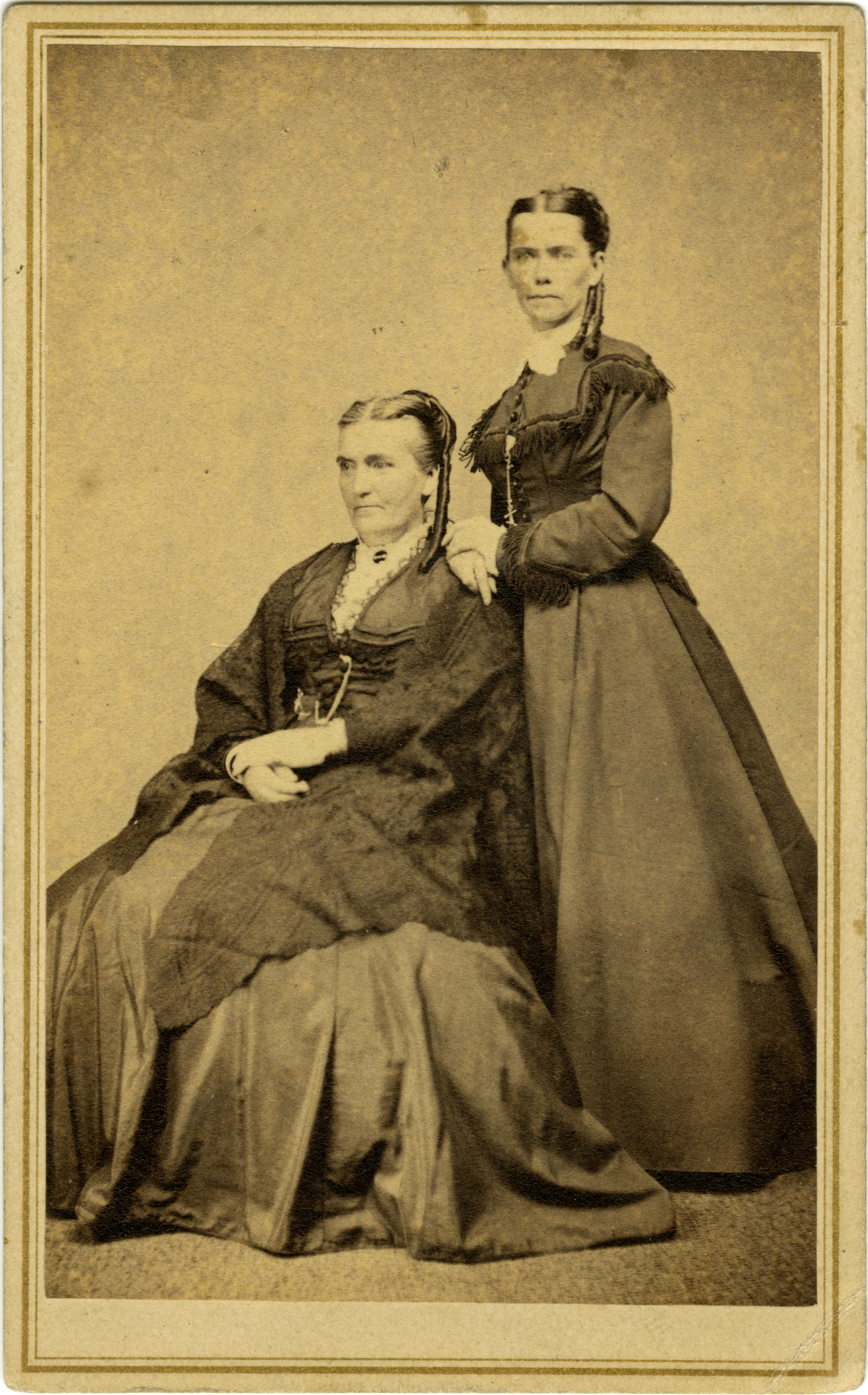
Frances Shimer (seated) and Cindarella Gregory, 1869

In 1852, the pioneer town of Mount Carroll, Illinois, lacking a public school, incorporated the Mount Carroll Seminary with no land, no teachers and no money. The town persuaded Frances Wood and Cindarella Gregory, two schoolteachers from Ballston Spa, New York, to come and teach. On May 11, 1853, the new seminary opened in a local church with eleven students. Shimer has evolved over time from a coeducational seminary (which at the time did not carry the current connotation of a school for training clergy, but was instead used to denote a school equating roughly to what we would now consider the last 2 years of high school and the first 2 years of college) to a women's seminary, a women's academy, a women's junior college, a women's college, to a coeducational Great Books college.

Unable to raise sufficient funds locally, the seminary's founders borrowed money to construct a building in 1854. They were discouraged by the school's finances and sold it to Wood and Gregory, who borrowed money for the purchase. In 1857, Wood married Henry Shimer, a mason who was a creditor of the seminary. Henry left immediately after the nuptials for medical school, securing private lodging upon his return; the new Mrs. Shimer continued to cohabit with Miss Gregory. In 1864, the overcrowded school began accepting female students only.

To ensure the seminary's long-term survival, in 1896 Frances Shimer reached an agreement with the University of Chicago in which the school became the Frances Shimer Academy of the University of Chicago and was loosely affiliated with the Baptist Church. She retired to Florida, never returning to the school, and died in 1901. University of Chicago president William Rainey Harper was the first to champion junior colleges in the United States, and in 1907 Shimer became one of the first schools to offer a junior-college program. The two-year junior-college program, operating with the original preparatory program, was accredited in 1920.

I don't care if we only pay our way for a time, if we can ultimately have a school that will be appreciated.

— Frances Wood Shimer, 1853

The college had a precipitous decline in enrollment and financial stability during and after the Great Depression, weathering the storm under five successive presidents. Its survival was due in part to the reorganization of the six-year preparatory program into a four-year junior college program and in part to steep salary reductions. In 1943, Shimer president Albin C. Bro invited the Department of Education at the University of Chicago to evaluate the college community; its 77 recommendations became the basis for Shimer's transformation from a conservative finishing school to a nontraditional, co-educational four-year college.

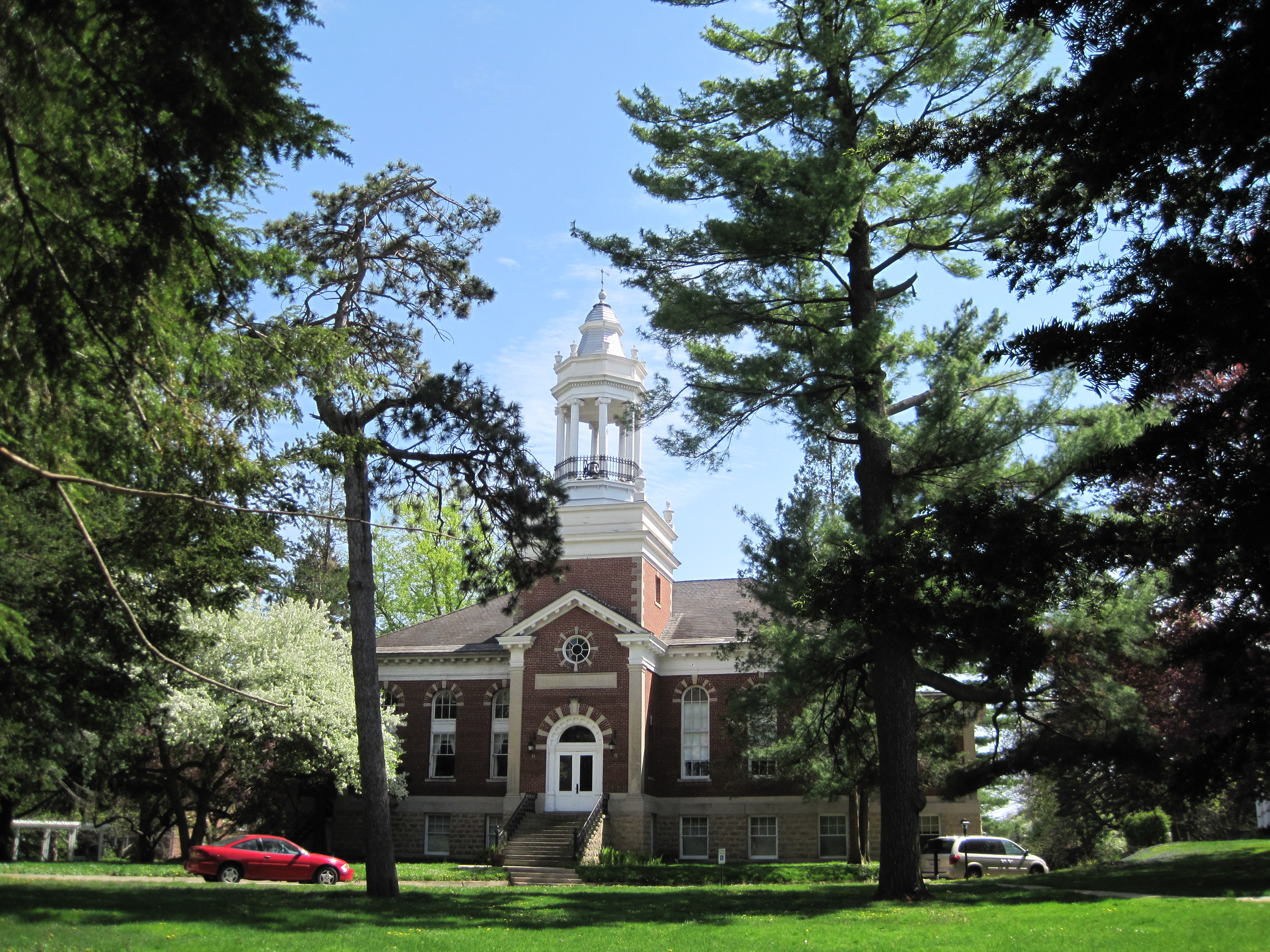
Metcalf Hall (built in 1907) was the main administration building of the Mount Carroll campus, which was added to the National Register of Historic Places in 1980.

The school was renamed Shimer College in 1950, adopting the great-books curriculum then in place at the University of Chicago. The university connection dissolved in 1958 after the latter's decision to abandon the great-books plan, and Shimer narrowly avoided bankruptcy in 1957. The great-books program at Shimer continued, and the school enjoyed national recognition and a rapid growth in enrollment during the 1960s. In 1963, a Harvard Educational Review article listed Shimer as one of 11 colleges with an "ideal intellectual climate". According to a 1966 article in the education journal Phi Delta Kappan, Shimer "present[ed] impressive statistical evidence that their students are better prepared for graduate work in the arts and sciences and in the professions than those who have specialized in particular areas".

During the late 1960s, Shimer experienced a period of internal unrest known as the Grotesque Internecine Struggle, with disputes over curriculum changes, the extent to which student behavior should be regulated and inadequate fundraising by president Francis Joseph Mullin. Half the faculty and a large portion of the student body left as a result. Its financial problems worsened, and the school's survival was uncertain. Although Shimer's trustees voted to close the college at the end of 1973, the school was saved by intense student and faculty fundraising. In the school's 1977 bankruptcy filing, the trustees, in the words of board chair Barry Carroll, "put responsibility for the school's continuing on the shoulders of a very dedicated faculty of 12 and students who volunteered".

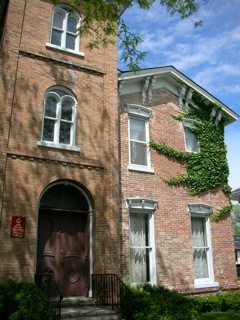
438 N. Sheridan Road, built in 1845, the main building of the Waukegan campus. The former campus was designated a historic district in 2006.

During the 1978 Christmas break, the faculty and 62 students borrowed trucks and moved the college into two "run-down" homes in Waukegan, Illinois, a suburb north of Chicago. Shimer emerged from bankruptcy in 1980. During the next 25 years, the college purchased 12 surrounding homes and the former YWCA facility at Genesee and Franklin Streets to form a makeshift campus and slowly progressed towards financial stability. By 1988 its enrollment had grown from a low of 40 to 114, and income exceeded expenses. In 1991, Shimer received a grant from the National Endowment for the Humanities with the help of NEH chair and core-curriculum advocate Lynne Cheney; the grant revitalized the school's fundraising, helping it raise $2 million.

In 2006, Shimer again moved to the campus of the Illinois Institute of Technology (IIT) in Chicago. Although the institutions operated independently, they cooperated closely under a long-term agreement.

Shimer received national attention in 2009, when it was embroiled in "a battle over what some saw as a right-wing attempt to take over its board and administration". In February 2012 the college announced the appointment of Susan Henking, former professor of religious studies at Hobart and William Smith Colleges, as Shimer's 14th president.

In September 2014 Shimer again received media attention when Ben Miller of Washington Monthly ranked it as one of the worst colleges in America, according to a formula adjusting graduation rates to the percentage of minority and low-income students and factoring net expense to low-income students. In December 2014 Jon Ronson of The Guardian disputed Miller's claim, citing Miller's assertion that the ranking was "at least partly due to small sample sizes".

== Academics ==
=== Curriculum history ===
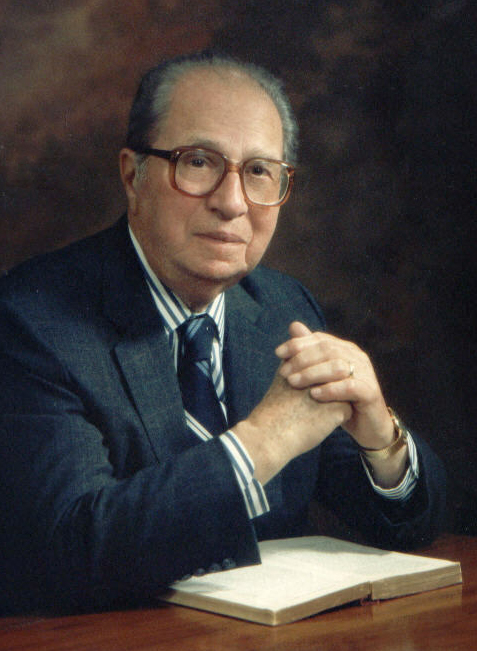
Mortimer Adler, whose great-books philosophy of education influenced Shimer's curriculum; Adler and Robert Maynard Hutchins founded the Great Books Foundation in 1947.

Shimer follows the great-books tradition begun by John Erskine. Erskine's Socratic seminar at Columbia University (begun in 1919) impacted his colleague, Mortimer J. Adler, who came to believe that the purpose of education was to engage student minds "in the study of individual works of merit ... accompanied by a discussion of the ideas, the values, and the forms embodied in such products of human art". Robert Maynard Hutchins, head of the University of Chicago from 1929 to 1951, brought Adler to the university and implemented a program (known as the Chicago Program and, later, the Hutchins Plan) based on Adler's ideas.

The Chicago program comprised sequences in the natural sciences, the humanities, and the social sciences which were supposed to integrate past and present work within these divisions of knowledge. In addition, these sequences were capped by work in philosophy and history. The emphasis in teaching was on small classes with bright students, where discussion could supplant monologue as the dominant pedagogic technique.... At the same time, in order to retain high academic standards and contact with the "frontiers of knowledge", the College's pedagogy emphasized reading originals (sometimes although not invariably, defined as Great Books).

Shimer, affiliated with the University of Chicago since 1896, adopted the Hutchins plan (including University of Chicago syllabi, comprehensive examinations and several university instructors) in 1950. When Hutchins left the university in 1951 and it abandoned the Hutchins Plan, Shimer continued to use it and it is still reflected in the college's curriculum.

=== Degree program ===
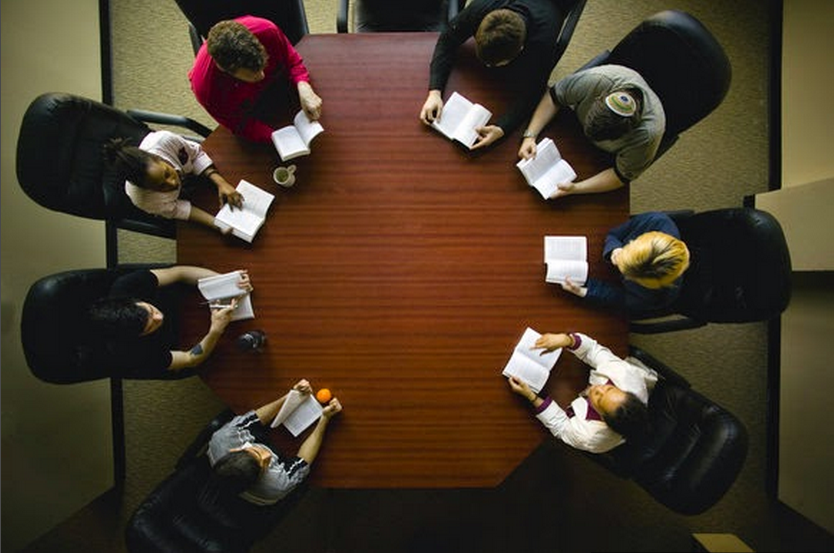
A typical class of seven students seated at an octagonal table (a characteristic of Shimer classrooms), from which the school's logo takes its shape

Shimer was accredited by the Higher Learning Commission. Its core curriculum was a sequence of sixteen required courses in the humanities, social sciences, natural sciences and interdisciplinary studies. Basic-studies courses are generally taken during the first two years, advanced-studies during the final two years and integrative-studies courses in the final year. In addition to core courses students take electives, which offer basic instruction or in-depth work in particular subjects. Students may also take tutorials, with one or two students per course, tailored to their interests and similar in structure to the Oxford tutorial system.

Shimer College students did not pursue traditional majors, instead having broad concentrations in the humanities, natural sciences or social sciences. Within these areas, students could specialize in literature, mathematics, philosophy, political science or psychology.

The school's 200-book reading list remained largely faithful to the original Hutchins plan, with new works judiciously added to the core curriculum. These included voices originally overlooked in the formation of the canon, or not yet published when it originated, including Martin Luther King Jr., Carol Gilligan, Frantz Fanon, Michel Foucault and other contemporary authors. Readings were organized by broad historical and philosophical themes.

Small seminars were the sole form of instruction in all subjects, from mathematics to poetry. Classes were composed of no more than twelve students (the average class size was seven), who read and discussed only source material. In a process Shimer called "shared inquiry", "the text is the teacher, and thus the faculty member's role is to facilitate interaction between the text and the students". According to a former Shimer professor:

At Shimer, the professor is a facilitator, a guide on the side, not a sage on the stage – encouraging each student to contribute to the intellectual light being kindled in every class. Each student was expected to question and comment upon the text, to respond to one other's insights, actively taking part in every discussion.... Students know their insights matter; they have something to offer to their peers, and to the life of the text being discussed. Some students are more exuberant than others, some would rather talk than listen; others may be a bit shy. The professor/facilitator must make sure that each student has a chance to shine, that each can feel confident, each can have the courage to ask what they think might be a stupid question. What are feared to be stupid questions are often the most provocative ones.

The curriculum emphasized writing; students were required to complete a semester project each term on a topic chosen in conjunction with an advisor, and were required to complete a research paper during their third year. All students needed to pass a basic-studies comprehensive examination to register for upper-level courses, and at least one area-studies comprehensive examination (usually in their area of concentration) to graduate. A senior thesis was required of all students. Usually an analytic or expository essay, it could also be a piece of original fiction, poetry, a performance or work of visual art. Students were encouraged to present their theses orally, and the public was invited to the presentations.

=== Special programs ===
==== Early Entrance program ====
The Early Entrance program, which admitted students who had not yet graduated from high school, was pioneered by Hutchins at the University of Chicago in 1937 and adopted by Shimer in 1950. It continued with the support of the Ford Foundation, the Carnegie Foundation and the Surdna Foundation. In the past, up to 80 percent of Shimer's student body was composed of Early Entrance students.

Early entrants were admitted after the 10th or 11th grade, and followed the regular curriculum. The college considered applications from any interested students, with motivation, willingness to learn and intellectual curiosity the most important qualifications. Shimer encouraged applications from home-schooled students, accommodating their lack of credentials such as transcripts. In 2008, 16 percent of new students were early entrants or home-schooled.

==== Joint programs ====
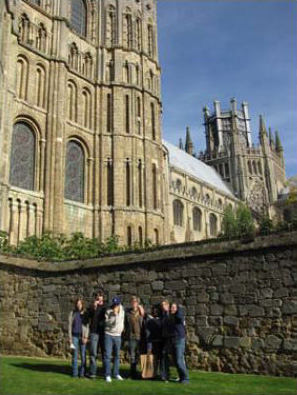
Shimer students in England; the school has had a study-abroad program in Oxford since 1963. The students are here seen at Ely Cathedral in England

The Great Books + Law program, introduced in 2007, was offered in conjunction with the Chicago-Kent College of Law (the law school of the Illinois Institute of Technology) and the Vermont Law School and allowed students to complete undergraduate and law degrees in six (instead of seven) years. Shimer had a dual-enrollment program with Harold Washington College, one of the few community colleges in the U.S. with a great-books program. The program allowed HWC students to take a Shimer course, and was intended to encourage students to transfer to Shimer to complete their bachelor's degree. Whether these programs will continue at North Central is unknown.

==== Study abroad ====
Shimer first offered a year of study abroad (in Paris) in 1961, and the college has had a biennial program in Oxford since 1963. The Shimer-in-Oxford program allowed third- or fourth-year students to study for one or two semesters in Oxford, supervised by a Shimer professor. Students took a core class each term with the supervising faculty; the rest of their work is completed in tutorials of self-selected subjects under the guidance of academics associated with the University of Oxford. Programs were also offered at least once each in Berlin and Köln during the late 1970s.

==== Teaching Fellows Program ====
The Teaching Fellows Program, now discontinued, was a graduate-level great-books course designed for kindergarten through 12th-grade teachers. Teachers could then earn professional development credit with the program; it complements traditional education courses by providing background knowledge for teachers to impart more content-rich instruction. The program was developed in conjunction with the Core Knowledge Foundation, founded in 1986 by E. D. Hirsch (author of Cultural Literacy: What Every American Needs to Know) to promote a common core in U.S. elementary education.

=== Faculty ===
In 2014, Shimer had eleven full-time faculty and one part-time faculty member, and the student-faculty ratio was eight to one. All full-time faculty had doctoral degrees. Shimer instructors teach across disciplines; the "ideal is that any faculty member can teach any one of the core courses".

In 2017, seven Shimer faculty joined the Shimer School of Great Books at North Central College.

=== Admission ===
Shimer applicants were evaluated according to their academic potential, and no minimum grade-point average or test score was required. Applicants were required to write essays analyzing their academic experience and demonstrating their creative talent. These essays and interviews were the primary criteria for admission. The college accepts students it believes will benefit from, and contribute to, its intellectual community. Barron's Profiles of American Colleges rates Shimer "very competitive plus". Candidates were counseled before applying, and nearly 90 percent of those who applied were admitted.

In 2010, the average GPA of incoming students was 3.29 out of 4.0. Average composite scores on standardized college-admissions tests were 28 on the ACT (the 92nd percentile) and 1917 on the SAT (the 90th percentile).

=== Tuition and fees ===
In 2014 full-time tuition was $27,491, and the total cost of attendance (including room, board and fees) was $41,615. All students received financial aid, with the average aid package $13,956. As of 2017, tuition and fees for the Shimer School will be identical to those of North Central College.

=== Recognition and rankings ===
Academic rankings

Liberal arts
- U.S. News & World Report: NR
- Washington Monthly: 200

In a 1998 University of Wisconsin–Madison study, the college had the highest rate of graduates receiving doctoral degrees of any liberal arts college and the third-highest rate of any undergraduate program in the nation. A 2009 report by Washington Monthly ranked Shimer third in graduate Ph.D. rate among U.S. liberal arts colleges. Studies based on Higher Education Data Sharing Consortium data found that Shimer had the seventh-highest alumni Ph.D. rate of U.S. colleges and universities, and the highest rate for Ph.D.s in linguistics.

Shimer students who took the Graduate Record Exam outscored three out of four potential graduate students, "consistently rank[ing] among the best in the nation in scores on the verbal and analytical portions of the test" with average analytic scores in the 91st percentile.

The conservative Insight magazine named Shimer one of its "15 Most Politically-Incorrect Colleges": "colleges that had strong and effective traditional curricula that were not 'obsessed with the recent educational fads and fetishes such as multiculturalism and diversity'". Barron's called Shimer one of the 300 best buys in college education, noting that "the success of the Shimer curriculum depends a great deal on the knowledge and skill of the faculty facilitators, who receive accolades ranging from 'fantastic' to 'brilliant'". Shimer was one of the top 50 colleges in All-American Colleges: Top Schools for Conservatives, Old-Fashioned Liberals, and People of Faith, which highlights "programs that connect in a special way with the core values of the American founding and the vibrant intellectual traditions of the West".

In 2007, Shimer joined a national effort by the Education Conservancy to boycott participation in college-ranking surveys. President William Craig Rice said, "What Shimer does well – educating ourselves in on-going dialogue with the greatest minds of the past – can't be captured in the U.S. News measurements". Washington Monthly ranks Shimer 200th among liberal-arts colleges, based on social mobility, research and service. The college is unranked by U.S. News & World Report.

== Campus ==
Through May 2017, Shimer was located on the main campus of the Illinois Institute of Technology. IIT's 120-acre (48.6 ha) campus is at the intersection of 33rd and State Streets, about three miles (4.8 km) south of the Chicago Loop, and borders the Bridgeport and Bronzeville neighborhoods of Chicago's Near South Side.

Shimer occupied 17,000 square feet (1,580 m^{2}) on two floors of the former Institute of Gas Technology complex. The complex, designed by Ludwig Mies van der Rohe, consists of four buildings (the southernmost formerly hosting the first industrial nuclear reactor in the U.S.) The college had access to the Paul V. Galvin Library, IIT's main research library, and Shimer's collection of 15,000 books were also housed in the Galvin Library since the school relocated from Waukegan.

As of June 1, 2017, the Shimer School of Great Books of North Central College is located on the campus of North Central in Naperville, Illinois.

== Organization and administration ==
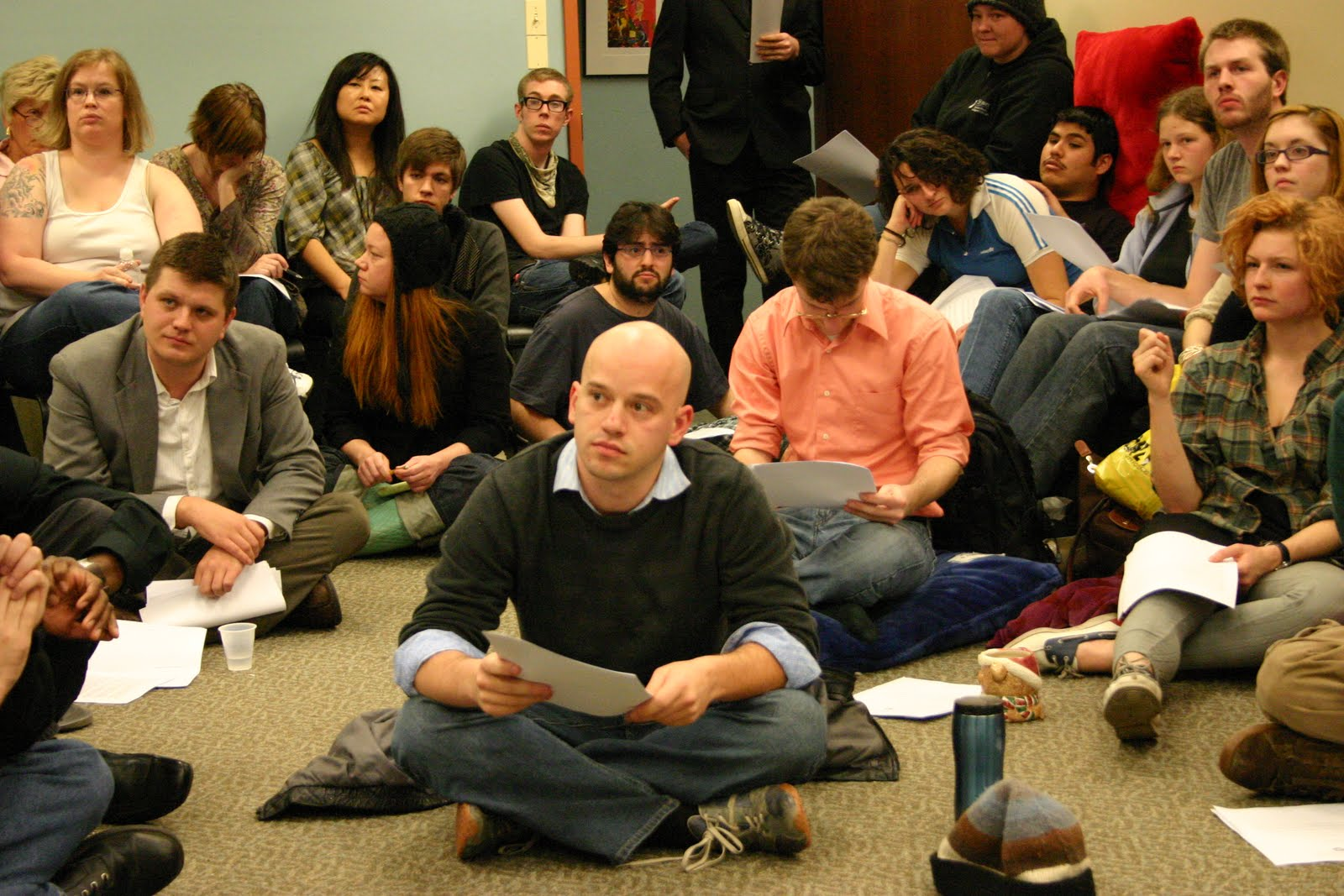
The Assembly, shown here in 2009, grew out of efforts by students and faculty to save the school during the late 1970s.

Until its move to become part of North Central College, "As a function of its mission to promote active citizenship" Shimer was "devoted to internal self-governance to an extent that is rare among institutions of higher education". Since 1977, Shimer has been governed internally by a body known as the Assembly. Begun informally in the years before the move to Waukegan, the Assembly was formalized with a constitution in 1980. Voting members included students, faculty, administrators, staff and trustees; alumni were members, but do not vote. This inclusive model of governance was unique in American higher education.

The Assembly had no independent legal authority, but governed "by virtue of the moral suasion established by communal deliberation". Its goal was to foster an environment in which "all the top-down bureaucracy of traditional colleges and universities has been replaced by participatory democracy committed to dialogue." In Chicago, Shimer students participated in the IIT Student Government Association, a liaison between students and university administration and a forum for student opinion.

In addition, Shimer had a Board of Trustees who appointed its presidents – including long serving president Don Moon and Shimer's last president Susan E. Henking, who successfully led the College to its new future at North Central College and was awarded an honorary doctorate in April 2017 in recognition of her service.

== Student life ==
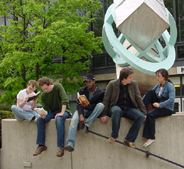
Shimer students at the Galvin Library; students had access to IIT's student activities.

The New York Times, calling Shimer "one of the smallest liberal arts colleges in the United States", described its students as "both valedictorians and high school dropouts. What the students share, besides a love of books, is a disdain for the conventional style of education. Many say they did not have a good high school experience." Shimer students tended to be individualistic, creative thinkers and are encouraged to be inquisitive. The college enrolled 97 students in 2014, about half from Illinois. Of these students 41 were women, 25 percent were students of color and 76 percent were age 24 or over. Forty percent were first-time, full-time college students. Of the full-time students attending for the first time in 2012, 86 percent returned for their second year. Sixty percent of students who entered in 2007 completed a bachelor's degree in six years.

The college has a tradition of community meals dating back to the Waukegan campus, when the community would meet for potluck meals and discuss matters of general interest. The Orange Horse, Shimer's biennial talent show since the 1960s, invites students, faculty and alumni to read poetry, sing, play music or tell jokes, individually or in groups. The Shimer theater program produces plays complementing its curriculum, offering anyone who wants to participate the chance to do so. Recent productions have included Anton Chekhov's Uncle Vanya and Eve Ensler's The Vagina Monologues.

In addition to student services at the McCormick Tribune Campus Center and its health and athletic facilities, while located in Chicago Shimer students could participate in the more than 150 student organizations sponsored by IIT (including Liit Magazine, IIT's student-run literary magazine and IIT's on-campus radio station, WIIT, where students can host a show). As students at North Central, Shimerians will have access to the full range of student services and student organizations.

== Alumni ==
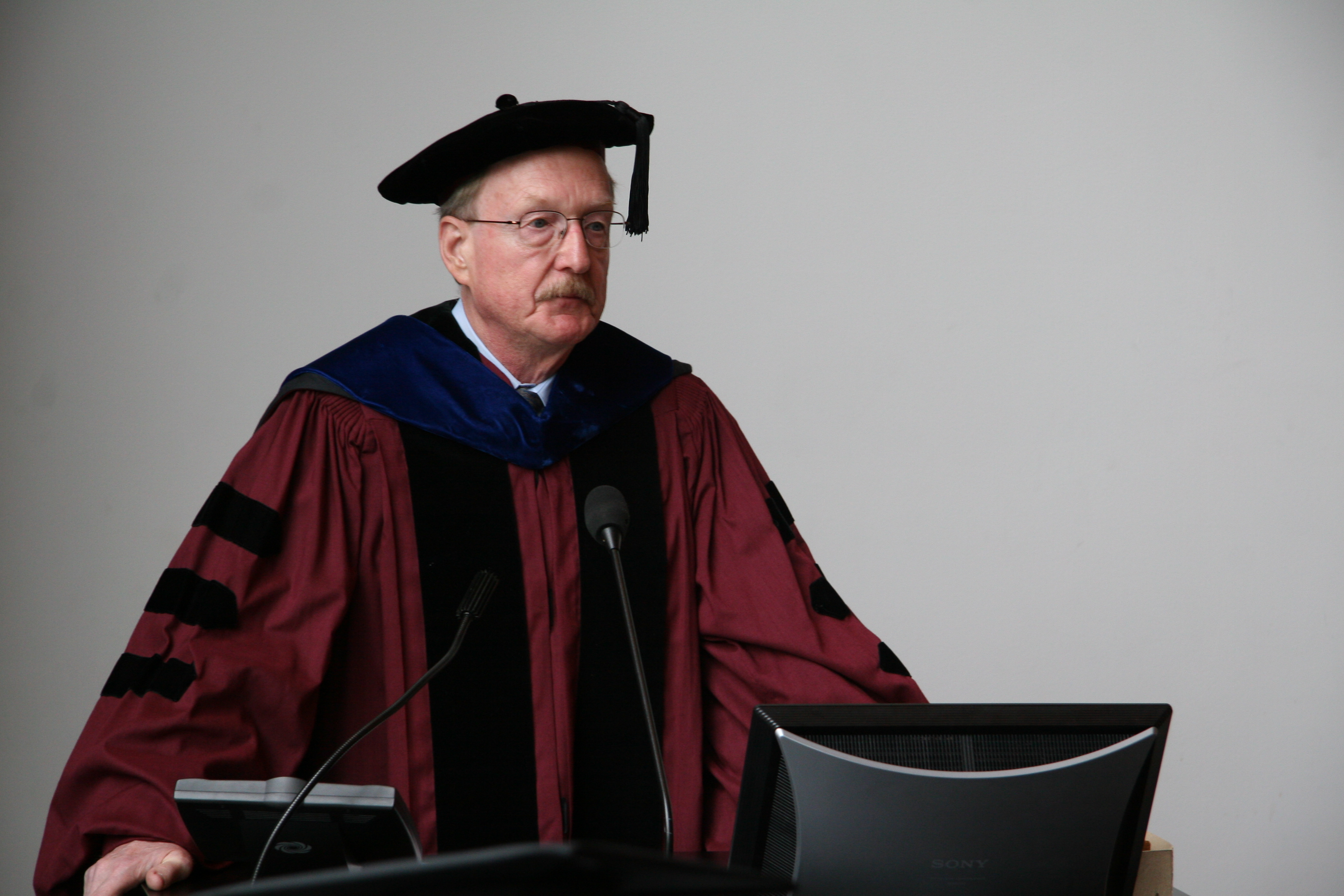
Arab-Israeli conflict scholar Alan Dowty

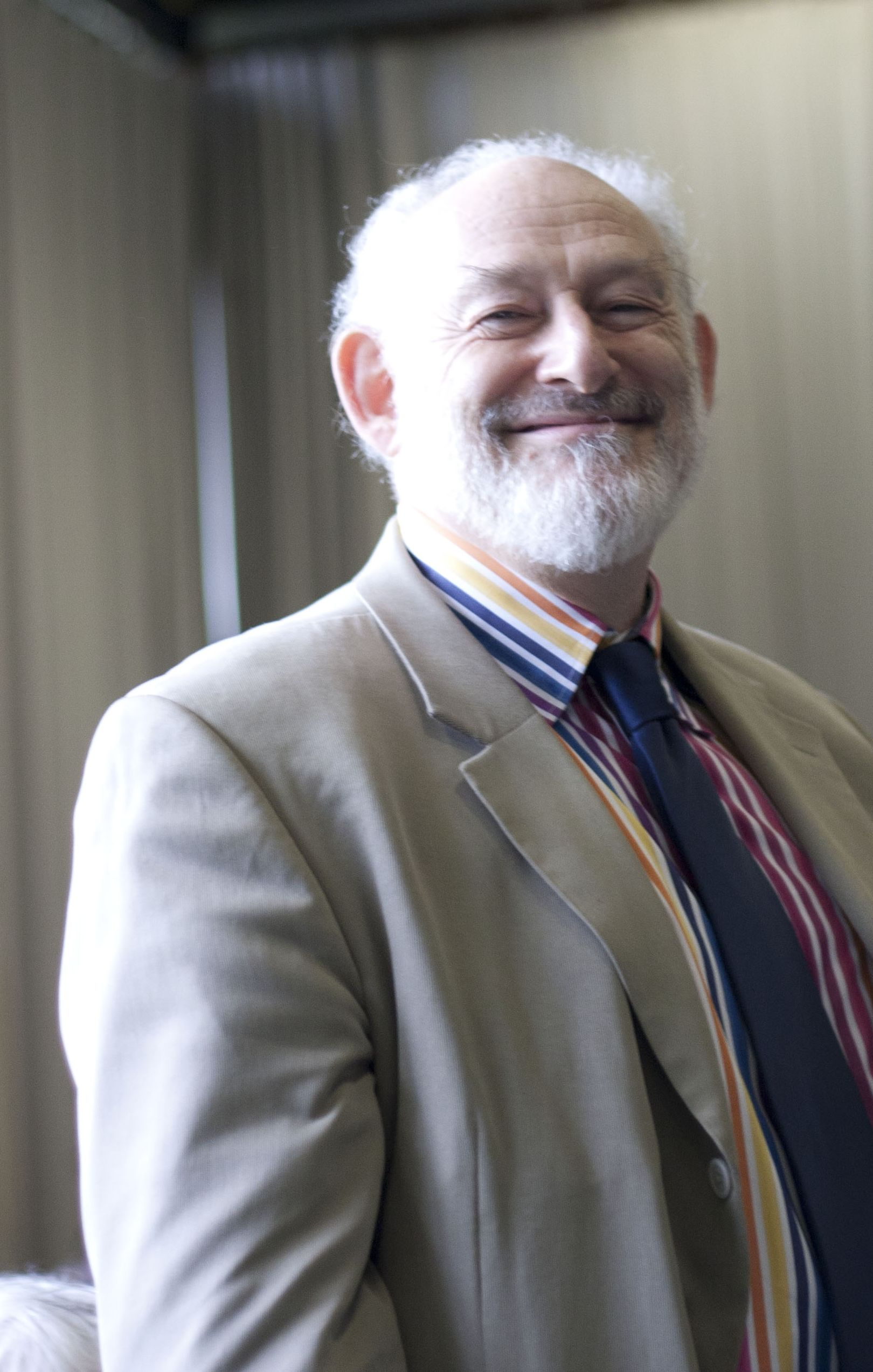
Physician, inventor, and Slate columnist Sydney Spiesel

Many Shimer alumni continued to graduate school; 50 percent earn master's degrees, and 21 percent earn doctorates. Another ten percent attend law school and five percent go to business school. As of 2008, Shimer had 5,615 living alumni. Nearly 25 percent of graduates are employed in education (elementary school through college), seven percent are attorneys and seven percent work in the computer-software industry.

=== Notable alumni ===
- Beulah Bondi: Oscar-nominated and Emmy-winning actress, graduated in 1907.
- Mary Anita Snook Southern: pioneer aviator
- Peter Cooley: Prize-winning poet, author, and professor of English at Tulane University
- Alan Dowty: Arab–Israeli conflict scholar and professor emeritus at the University of Notre Dame
- Robert Keohane: Political scientist, international relations scholar and professor at the Woodrow Wilson School of Public and International Affairs best known for After Hegemony: Cooperation and Discord in the World Political Economy
- Phoebe Snow: Grammy-nominated singer-songwriter best known for her 1974 hit, "Poetry Man"
- Laurie Spiegel: Composer, software engineer and electronic and computer music pioneer
- Sydney Spiesel: Medical inventor, Slate columnist and professor at the Yale University School of Medicine
- Nick Pippenger: Computing researcher and theorist, IBM Fellow and professor at Harvey Mudd College. Known for his work on the foundations of computer science, including complexity, computability and communications theory
- Jen Richards: Emmy nominated actor and producer of HerStory
- Elizabeth Vandiver: classics scholar and author
- Tucker Viemeister: Award-winning industrial designer and holder of 32 US patents, called "industrial design's elder wonderkind" by I.D.
- Mary Wings: Writer, artist, and musician known for publishing the first lesbian underground comic book and a series of novels with lesbian detective Emma Victor
- Roland Winston: Leading figure in nonimaging optics and its applications to solar energy who has been called the "father of non-imaging optics". Director of the California Advanced Solar Technologies Institute
- Dorian Electra: American singer, songwriter, video and performance artist.
- Precious Okoyomon: Poet, artist, and chef.

== Notes ==
a: The school was called a seminary but did not engage in religious instruction. It was part finishing school and part preparatory school, designed to produce female teachers. The four-year program (which the Junior College later extended to six) covered what was essentially a good quality high school program, such that "students [were] prepared for the very best institutions east and west."
b: Under the agreement, Shimer remained independent with its own board, of which a majority represented the U. of C. and two-thirds were required to be Baptist. Shimer was administered locally, but subject to a chief administrator in Chicago for final decisions.
c: The others are St. John's College in Annapolis, Maryland, and Santa Fe, New Mexico, Thomas Aquinas College in Santa Paula, California, and Thomas More College of Liberal Arts in Merrimack, New Hampshire.
d: Adler and Hutchins collaborated on The Great Books of the Western World, published in 1952, which was intended to present the entire Western canon in one 54-volume set. The selection of works it contained defined the reading list on which Great Books curricula were based, and which Shimer has largely kept, with minor changes, ever since.
e: The Hutchins plan also instituted placement exams, which students would take before enrollment "to determine how much or how little of the program they need". This practice lives on at Shimer, where students are able to place out of several of the basic core courses by examination.

== Works cited ==
- "Academic Catalog 2013–2015". Shimer College. 2013. Archived from the original (PDF) on January 3, 2015.
- "Academic Catalog 2015–2017". Shimer College. 2015. Archived from the original (PDF) on March 22, 2016.
- Beam, Alex (2008). A Great Idea at the Time: The Rise, Fall, and Curious Afterlife of the Great Books (1st ed.). New York: PublicAffairs. ISBN 978-1-58648-487-3.
- Bonham, Jeriah (1883). Fifty Years' Recollections: With Observations and Reflections on Historical Events, Giving Sketches of Eminent Citizens Their Lives and Public Services. Peoria, IL: J.W. Franks & Sons. OCLC 3262599.
- Casement, William (1996). The Great Canon Controversy: The Battle of the Books in Higher Education. New Brunswick, NJ: Transaction Publishers. ISBN 1-55778-742-5.
- "Constitution of the Assembly of Shimer College". Shimer College. 2013. Archived from the original (PDF) on December 20, 2014.
- Cubbage, Kent Thomas (2009). America's Great Books Colleges and Their Curious Histories of Success, Struggle, and Failure (Ph.D. thesis). University of South Carolina.
- Dzuback, Mary Ann (1991). Robert M. Hutchins: Portrait of an Educator. Chicago: University of Chicago Press. ISBN 0-226-17710-6.
- Fund for the Advancement of Education (1957). They Went to College Early. New York. OCLC 00235008.
- Glass, Rose (1953). "Shimer College History (1853–1950)" . In Hostetter, A. Beth (ed.). Centennial Anniversary Record. Mt. Carroll, IL: Shimer College. pp. 3–22. OCLC 33122715.
- Kavaloski, Vincent C. (1979). "Interdisciplinary Education and Humanistic Aspiration: A Critical Reflection". In Kockelmans, Joseph J (ed.). Interdisciplinarity and Higher Education. University Park, PA: Pennsylvania State University Press. pp. 224–243. ISBN 0-271-02326-0.
- H.F. Kett & Co, ed. (1878). The History Of Carroll County, Illinois, Containing a History of the County – Its Cities, Towns, Etc. Chicago: H.F. Kett & Co. OCLC 3368934.
- Moorhead, Patrick H. (1983). Shimer College Presidency 1930 to 1980 (Ed.D. thesis). Loyola University of Chicago. OCLC 9789513.
- Severson, Stanley (1975). Responses to Threatened Organizational Death (Ph.D. thesis). University of Chicago. OCLC 28780062.
- "Shimer College Catalog 2009–2011" (fee required). Shimer College. 2009.

=== Further reading ===
- Frances Wood Shimer, 1826–1901. Mt. Carroll, IL. 1901. OCLC 13863166.
- Malkmus, Doris (2003). "Frances Wood Shimer, Cindarella Gregory, and the 1853 founding of Shimer College". Journal of Illinois History. 6. Illinois Historic Preservation Agency: 195–214. ISSN 1522-0532.
