= National Register of Historic Places listings in Will County, Illinois =

Location of Will County in Illinois

This is a list of the National Register of Historic Places listings in Will County, Illinois.

This is intended to be a complete list of the properties and districts on the National Register of Historic Places in Will County, Illinois, United States. Latitude and longitude coordinates are provided for many National Register properties and districts; these locations may be seen together in a map.

There are 39 properties and districts listed on the National Register in the county, including 1 National Historic Landmark. Another property was once listed but has been removed.

This National Park Service list is complete through NPS recent listings posted May 1, 2026.

== Current listings ==
	Name on the Register	Image	Date listed	Location	City or town	Description
1	Alternate Route 66, Wilmington to Joliet	Alternate Route 66, Wilmington to Joliet	May 5, 2006 (#06000381)	Illinois Route 53 between Wilmington and Joliet; 41°24′16″N 88°06′27″W	Joliet and Wilmington	This is the section of former U.S. Route 66 that traveled from Wilmington to Joliet. The road mostly traverses agricultural land, but does pass the former Joliet Army Ammunition Plant. Most of this 15.9-mile (25.6 km) stretch has been re-designated Illinois Route 53. One bridge, one overpass, and Four concrete box culverts along the road are also included in the listing.
2	Beecher Mausoleum	Beecher Mausoleum	September 18, 2013 (#13000714)	Jct. of IL 1 & Horner Ln. 41°20′13″N 87°37′08″W	Washington Township	
3	Brandon Road Lock and Dam Historic District	Brandon Road Lock and Dam Historic District	March 10, 2004 (#04000163)	1100 Brandon Road; 41°30′17″N 88°06′20″W	Joliet	The Brandon Road Lock and Dam is one of eight locks and dams used to control water levels of the Illinois Waterway. The waterway connects the Chicago River to the Mississippi River.
4	Briscoe Mounds	Briscoe Mounds	December 22, 1978 (#78001198)	Front St. along the Des Plaines River; 41°25′10″N 88°13′08″W	Channahon	The mounds are an archeological site located along the north side of the Des Plaines River. Surveys and excavations from 1938 to 1964 revealed Mississippian pottery and bodies dating from 1200-1500 AD.
5	Chicago Sanitary and Ship Canal Historic District	Chicago Sanitary and Ship Canal Historic District	December 20, 2011 (#11000907)	Illinois Waterway miles 290.0-321.7; 41°38′31″N 88°03′37″W	Lemont, Romeoville and Lockport	part of the Illinois Waterway Navigation System Facilities MPS; extends from the West Side of Chicago through Cook County west of Chicago and DuPage County to Lockport
6	Christ Episcopal Church	Christ Episcopal Church	August 12, 1982 (#82002603)	75 West Van Buren Street; 41°31′33″N 88°05′03″W	Joliet	The church was built in 1885 to serve the Episcopalian religious congregation. Designed by F. S. Allen, the congregation met in the church until 2004. It was destroyed in a 2006 fire.
7	Downtown Joliet Historic District		December 26, 2023 (#100009642)	Roughly bounded by the western terminus of the Jefferson Street and Jackson Street bridges over the Des Plaines River and Ottawa and Joliet Streets on the west, Jefferson Street on the south, Scott and Chicago Streets on the east, and Cass and Irving Street; 41°31′30″N 88°04′59″W	Joliet	
8	Downtown Peotone Historic District	Downtown Peotone Historic District	November 16, 2005 (#05001253)	Roughly North First Street and both sides of North Second Street, roughly bounded by the alley south of Main and north by North Street; 41°20′03″N 87°47′29″W	Peotone	The Illinois Central Railroad opened in 1856 with a station in eastern Will County. The surrounding area became known as Peotone and featured a lively commercial district along the tracks. This district later expanded in response to growing use of automobiles.
9	Downtown Plainfield Historic District	Downtown Plainfield Historic District	September 18, 2013 (#13000719)	Lockport bounded by Division & Main Sts. 41°36′30″N 88°12′18″W	Plainfield	
10	Eagle Hotel	Eagle Hotel	February 16, 1994 (#94000021)	100–104 Water Street; 41°18′28″N 88°08′51″W	Wilmington	Eagle Hotel opened in the late 1830s to accommodate farmers traveling to Wilmington to use the local grist mill. The Chicago and Alton Railroad and U.S. Route 66 were later constructed near the hotel, providing further commerce. The interior was badly damaged in a 1990 fire.
11	Fitzpatrick House	Fitzpatrick House	February 9, 1984 (#84001170)	Illinois Route 53; 41°36′02″N 88°04′15″W	Romeoville	
12	Flanders House	Flanders House	November 14, 1991 (#91001688)	405 West Main Street; 41°36′45″N 88°12′10″W	Plainfield	
13	Ron George Round Barn	Ron George Round Barn	December 7, 1982 (#82000401)	Northeast of Romeoville off of U.S. Route 66; 41°39′28″N 88°09′52″W	Bolingbrook	Relocated in 1998 to Essington Road.
14	John Heck House	John Heck House	August 16, 1994 (#94000978)	1225 South Hamilton Street; 41°35′07″N 88°03′29″W	Lockport	
15	Jacob H. Henry House	Jacob H. Henry House	May 14, 1979 (#79000875)	20 South Eastern Avenue; 41°31′23″N 88°04′35″W	Joliet	
16	Illinois and Michigan Canal	Illinois and Michigan Canal	October 15, 1966 (#66000332)	7 miles (11 km) southwest of Joliet on U.S. Route 6, in Channahon State Park; 41°34′11″N 88°04′11″W	Joliet	
17	Illinois State Penitentiary-Joliet Historic District	Illinois State Penitentiary-Joliet Historic District	September 25, 2023 (#100009371)	1125 Collins St. 41°32′49″N 88°04′27″W	Joliet	
18	Joliet YMCA	Joliet YMCA	February 9, 2006 (#06000010)	215 North Ottawa Street; 41°31′50″N 88°05′01″W	Joliet	
19	Joliet East Side Historic District	Joliet East Side Historic District	August 15, 1980 (#80001418)	Roughly bounded by Washington and Union Streets, 4th and Eastern Avenues; 41°31′08″N 88°04′28″W	Joliet	
20	Joliet Municipal Airport	Joliet Municipal Airport	December 10, 1980 (#80001419)	4000 West Jefferson Street; 41°31′24″N 88°10′46″W	Joliet	
21	Joliet Steel Works	Joliet Steel Works	February 28, 1991 (#91000088)	927 Collins Street; 41°32′28″N 88°04′30″W	Joliet	
22	Joliet Township High School	Joliet Township High School	August 12, 1982 (#82002604)	201 East Jefferson Street; 41°31′32″N 88°04′28″W	Joliet	
23	Louis Joliet Hotel	Louis Joliet Hotel	February 9, 1990 (#90000101)	22 East Clinton Street; 41°31′36″N 88°04′48″W	Joliet	
24	Lockport Historic District	Lockport Historic District	May 12, 1975 (#75000676)	Area between 7th and 11th Streets and Canal and Washington Streets; 41°35′22″N 88°03′25″W	Lockport	
25	Lockport Lock, Dam and Power House Historic District	Lockport Lock, Dam and Power House Historic District	March 10, 2004 (#04000167)	2502 Channel Drive; 41°34′10″N 88°04′44″W	Lockport	
26	McGovney–Yunker Farmstead	McGovney–Yunker Farmstead	May 31, 2006 (#06000448)	10824 LaPorte Road; 41°31′36″N 87°52′53″W	Mokena	
27	Robert Milne House	Robert Milne House	December 17, 1979 (#79000876)	535 East 7th Street; 41°35′22″N 88°02′57″W	Lockport	
28	Peotone Mill	Peotone Mill	March 19, 1982 (#82002605)	433 West Corning Avenue; 41°19′56″N 87°47′53″W	Peotone	
29	Joseph Ferris Perry House	Joseph Ferris Perry House	December 20, 2022 (#100008486)	365 West Exchange St. 41°26′43″N 87°37′33″W	Crete	
30	Plainfield Halfway House	Plainfield Halfway House	September 29, 1980 (#80001421)	503 Main Street; 41°36′41″N 88°12′15″W	Plainfield	
31	Rubens Rialto Square Theater	Rubens Rialto Square Theater	July 24, 1978 (#78001199)	102 North Chicago Street; 41°31′34″N 88°04′53″W	Joliet	
32	Hiram B. Scutt Mansion	Hiram B. Scutt Mansion	February 5, 2003 (#02001760)	206 N Broadway; 41°31′37″N 88°05′18″W	Joliet	
33	Small–Towle House	Small–Towle House	May 12, 2004 (#04000419)	515 County Road; 41°18′39″N 88°08′31″W	Wilmington	
34	Standard Oil Gasoline Station	Standard Oil Gasoline Station	November 13, 1984 (#84000340)	600 West Lockport Street; 41°36′29″N 88°12′20″W	Plainfield	
35	Stone Manor	Stone Manor	November 26, 1980 (#80001420)	Southeast of Lockport; 41°34′23″N 87°56′10″W	Homer Glen	
36	U.S. Post Office	U.S. Post Office	August 20, 1981 (#81000223)	150 North Scott Street; 41°31′39″N 88°04′49″W	Joliet	
37	Union Station	Union Station	August 1, 1978 (#78001200)	50 East Jefferson Street; 41°31′28″N 88°04′47″W	Joliet	
38	Upper Bluff Historic District	Upper Bluff Historic District	June 5, 1991 (#91000687)	Roughly bounded by Taylor, Center and Campbell Streets and Raynor Avenue; 41°31′45″N 88°05′47″W	Joliet	
39	Will County Historical Society Headquarters	Will County Historical Society Headquarters	May 17, 1972 (#72000467)	803 South State Street; 41°35′21″N 88°03′17″W	Lockport	

== Former listings ==
	Name on the Register	Image	Date listed	Date removed	Location	City or town	Description
1	Ninth Street Seven Arch Stone Bridge		August 20, 2004 (#04000866)	August 28, 2012	Ninth Street spanning Deep Run Creek; 41°35′36″N 88°03′53″W	Lockport	Destroyed in a 2011 storm.
2	Will County Courthouse		May 22, 2023 (#100009005)	March 20, 2025	14 West Jefferson St. 41°31′30″N 88°04′56″W	Joliet	Demolished in 2024.

== See also ==
- List of National Historic Landmarks in Illinois
- National Register of Historic Places listings in Illinois
