= Small House =

Small House may refer to:

== Buildings ==
=== Australia ===
- The Small House (Domenic Alvaro), a house in Sydney, Australia

=== United States ===
- Small House (Macon, Georgia)
- Small-Towle House, Wilmington, Illinois
- Dutton-Small House, Vassalboro, Maine
- Milton Small House, Raleigh, North Carolina
- Charles and Eleanor Small House, Belle Fourche, South Dakota, listed on the National Register of Historic Places (NRHP)
- Small-Elliott House, Walla Walla, Washington, listed on the NRHP

== Other uses ==
- Small house (Zimbabwe), an expression describing an extramarital affair

== See also ==
- Small house movement
- Small House Policy of Hong Kong
- The Small House at Allington, a novel by Anthony Trollope
