= Homer Township, Illinois =

Homer Township
- Township
- Location in Will County
- Country: United States
- State: Illinois
- County: Will
- Established: November 6, 1836

Area
  - Total: 36.1 sq mi (93 km^{2})
  - Land: 36.06 sq mi (93.4 km^{2})
  - Water: 0.05 sq mi (0.13 km^{2}) 0.14%

Population (2010)
  - Estimate (2016): 39,495
  - Density: 1,083.3/sq mi (418.3/km^{2})
- Time zone: UTC-6 (CST)
  - Summer (DST): UTC-5 (CDT)
- FIPS code: 17-197-35827
- Website: homertownship.com

Homer Township is located in Will County, Illinois. As of the 2010 census, its population was 39,059 and it contained 13,418 housing units. In 2001, the village of Homer Glen was incorporated within area that is Homer Township. This region was formerly an unincorporated census-designated place known as Goodings Grove, Illinois.

== Geography ==
According to the 2010 census, the township has a total area of 36.1 square miles (93 km^{2}), of which 36.06 square miles (93.4 km^{2}) (or 99.89%) is land and 0.05 square miles (0.13 km^{2}) (or 0.14%) is water.

=== Cities, towns villages ===
- Homer Glen (vast majority)
- Lemont (small portion)
- Lockport (small portion)

=== Other Communities ===
- Hadley at 41.570866°N 87.943947°W
- Lockport Heights (part)

=== Ghost towns ===
- Goodings Grove

== Demographics ==
Historical population
Census	Pop.	Note	%±
2016 (est.)	39,495
U.S. Decennial Census

== Education ==
Homer Township and Homer Glen is part of the Homer Community Consolidated School District 33C, with some areas part of Will County School District 92.
