= Gooding =

Gooding may refer to:

== Places ==
- Gooding County, Idaho, a county in the United States
- Gooding, Colorado, an unincorporated community in the United States
- Gooding, Idaho, a city in the United States
  - Gooding High School, located within the city
- Goodings Grove, Illinois, a census-designated place in the United States
- Gooding Drive, a road in Australia

== Other uses ==
- Gooding (surname), an English surname
- Gooding (band), an American rock band
- Gooding railway station, in Australia
- Gooding, an old English custom of asking for money during the Feast of St. Thomas

== See also ==
- Gooding & Company, an American car auction company
- Goodings (surname)
