= Goodings =

Goodings is a surname. Notable people with the surname include:

- Allen Goodings (1925–1992), Bishop of Quebec
- Frits Goodings (1963–1989), Dutch footballer from Suriname
- Graeme Goodings (born 1948), Australian television journalist
- Lennie Goodings (born 1953), Canadian-born publisher

== See also ==
- Gooding (disambiguation)
- Goodings Grove, Illinois
