= Stone Manor =

Historic house in Illinois, United States

- U.S. National Register of Historic Places
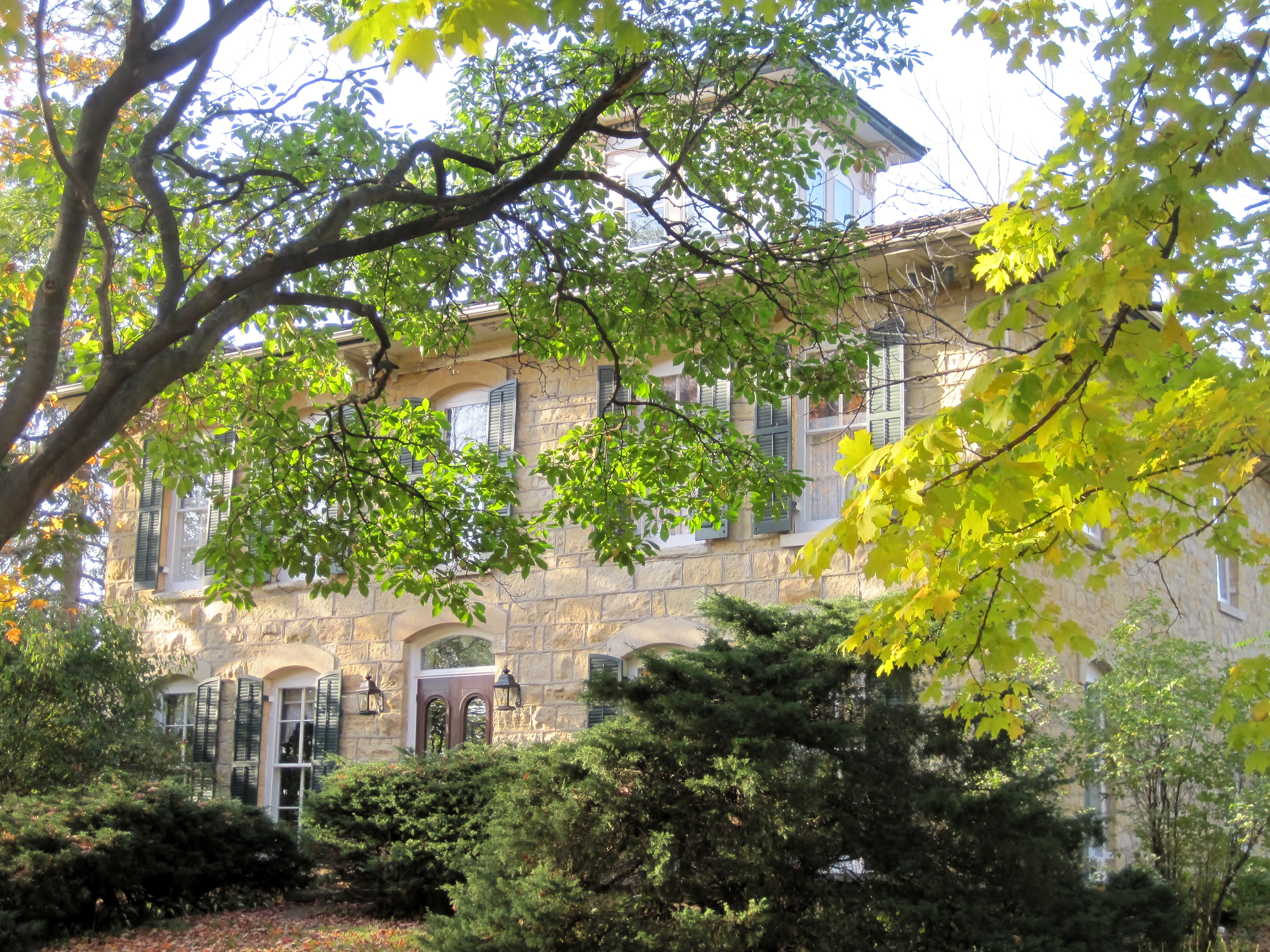

- Location within Illinois Location within the United States
- Location: Southeast of Lockport in Homer Glen, Will County, Illinois, U.S.
- Coordinates: 41°34′23″N 87°56′10″W
- Built: 1865
- Architectural style: Italianate
- NRHP reference No.: 80001420
- Added to NRHP: November 26, 1980

The Stone Manor is a historic Italianate residence in Homer Glen, Illinois.

== History ==
Elijah D. Gorham moved to Homer Township in 1863. The lumber for the house was cut from the farmstead; other timber was traded for limestone from the Joliet Prison. Gorham later moved to rural Kansas and founded the town of Gorham. Ownership of the farm remained in Gorham's hands until his death in 1906. Gorham's widow sold the property to James D. Frazer. The Frazer family owned the residence until 1977. The house was recognized by the National Park Service with a listing on the National Register of Historic Places on November 26, 1980.

== Architecture ==
The Stone Manor is an excellent local example of Italianate architecture. Representative of the style, the house is symmetrical and features arched windows and ornate trim. The two-story house is 26 by 40 feet (7.9 m × 12.2 m) with a 18 by 33 feet (5.5 m × 10.1 m) rear addition. The hipped roof was originally covered in wood shingles, but these have seen been replaced with asphalt ones. The exterior of the house is constructed with Joliet limestone blocks 19 inches (480 mm) thick. The house was trimmed with wood harvested on the original farmstead. The building is capped with a 9-by-10-foot (2.7 m × 3.0 m) cupola. Windows are 5 by 6 feet (1.5 m × 1.8 m) and originally had shutters, which have since been replaced. The house sits on a full basement with a limestone slab floor. The first floor has six rooms and the second floor has five; the cupola and the attic provide additional interior space. A gable-roofed barn is found 40 feet (12 m) behind the house.
