= Gooding (surname) =

Gooding is an English surname, derived from the Old English name Gōding. Notable people with the surname include:

- Alf Gooding (died 2018), Welsh entrepreneur
- Anthony Simonds-Gooding (1937–2017), Irish executive
- Arthur C. Gooding (1871–1971), American businessman and politician
- Andrew Gooding (born 1964), Jamaican sailor
- Caroline Gooding (1959–2014), British solicitor and activist for individuals with disabilities
- Cecil Gooding (1883–1904), American football player
- Celia Rose Gooding (born 2000), American actress and singer
- Cuba Gooding Sr. (1944–2017), American soul singer
  - Cuba Gooding Jr. (born 1968), American actor and son of Cuba Gooding Sr.
  - Mason Gooding (born 1996), American actor and son of Cuba Gooding Jr.
  - Omar Gooding (born 1976), American actor and son of Cuba Gooding Sr.
- Cynthia Gooding (1924–1988), American folk singer
- David Gooding (1947–2009), British academic
- David Willoughby Gooding (1925–2019), British academic
- Frank R. Gooding (1859–1928), American politician
- Hattie B. Gooding (1877 - 1938), American publicity agent
- Heather Gooding (born 1958), Barbadian sprinter
- Henry C. Gooding (1838–1913), American judge
- James Henry Gooding (1838–1864), American soldier
- Jason Gooding (born 1979), Trinidadian triathlete
- Jay Gooding (born 1976), Australian tennis player and coach
- Jody Gooding, British volleyball player
- Maria Simonds-Gooding (born 1939), Indian born Anglo-Irish artist
- Mark Gooding, British diplomat
- Mick Gooding (born 1959), British footballer
- Oliver Paul Gooding (1835–1909), American general
- Ray Gooding (born 1959), British footballer and coach
- Robert C. Gooding (1918–1999), American admiral
- Robert Gooding-Williams (born 1953), American philosopher and professor
- Terry Gooding (1931–2018), British boxer
