= Daniel H. Paddock =

American politician

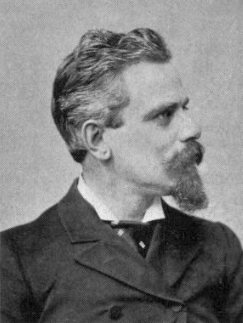

Member of the Illinois House of Representatives
- In office 1889–1895

Personal details
- Born: Daniel Holmes Paddock; April 10, 1852 Lockport, Illinois, US
- Died: December 26, 1905 (aged 53) Hot Springs, Arkansas, US
- Party: Republican
- Education: Albany Law School
- Occupation: Lawyer

Daniel Holmes Paddock (April 10, 1852 – December 26, 1905) was an American lawyer and politician.

== Biography ==
Paddock was born in Lockport, Illinois. In 1853, Paddock moved with his parents to Kankakee, Illinois. He went to the public schools. In 1874, he received his law degree from Albany Law School and was admitted to the Illinois and New York bars. Paddock practiced law in Kankakee, Illinois. He serve as the Kankakee city attorney and as the state's attorney for Kankakee County. Padock served in the Illinois House of Representatives from 1889 to 1895 and was a Republican. In 1896, he ran for the Republican nomination for Illinois Attorney General and lost the election to Edward C. Akin. Paddock died suddenly in Hot Springs, Arkansas where he had gone because of serious health problems.
