= Lockport Historic District =

Historic district in Illinois, United States

- U.S. National Register of Historic Places
- U.S. Historic district
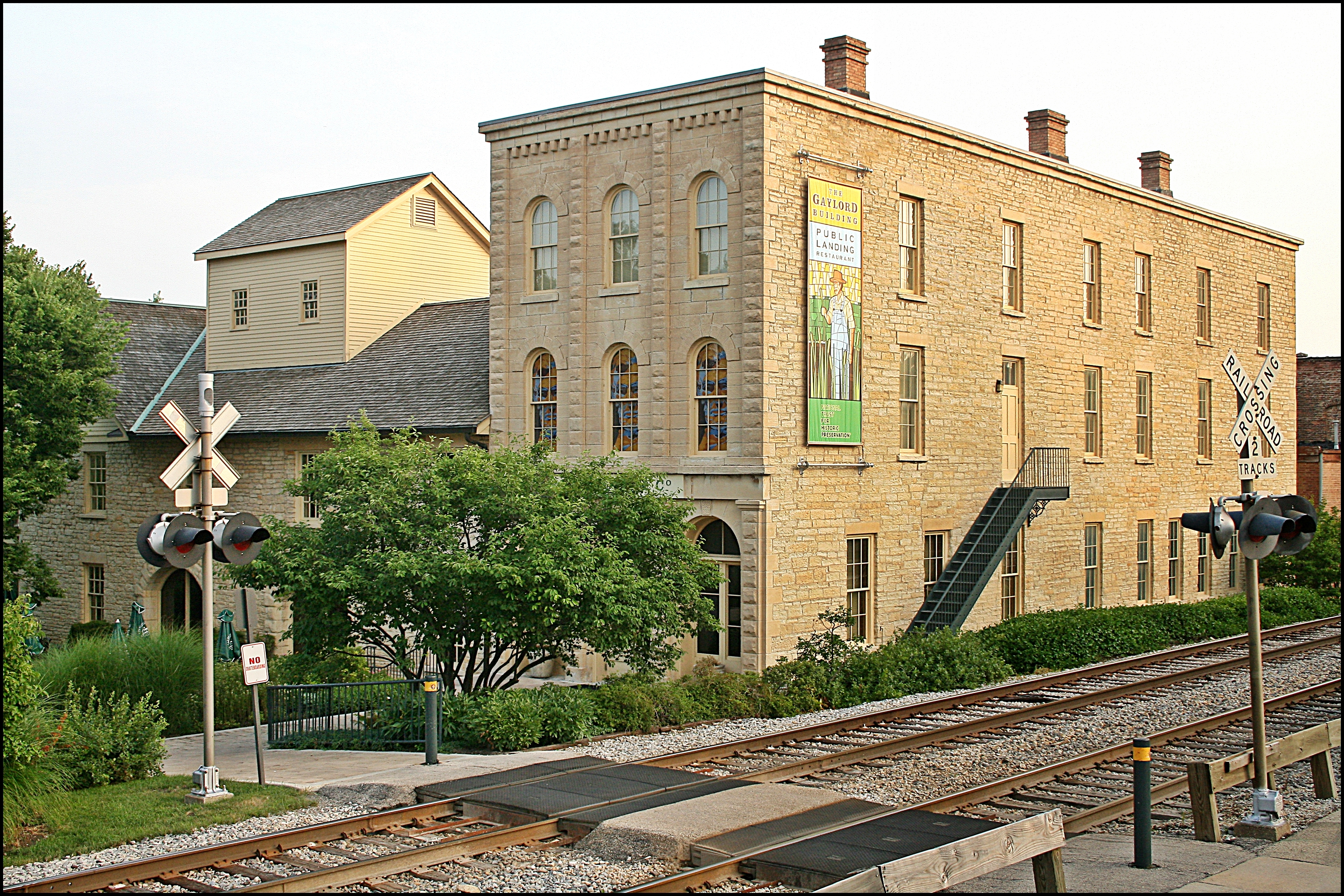
- The Gaylord Building in the Lockport Historic District

- Location within Illinois Location within the United States
- Interactive map showing the location of Lockport Historic District
- Location: Area between 7th and 11th Streets and Canal and Washington Streets; Lockport, Will County, Illinois, U.S.
- Coordinates: 41°35′22″N 88°3′25″W
- NRHP reference No.: 75000676
- Added to NRHP: May 12, 1975

The Lockport Historic District, also known as the Canal and Downtown Area, is a set of fifty-nine buildings in Lockport, Illinois. Of these, fifty-six contribute to the historical integrity of the area.

== History ==
The downtown district of Lockport was platted in 1836, the same year that construction began on the Illinois and Michigan Canal (I&M Canal). Two years later, Lockport was designated as the headquarters for the I&M. Due to the importance of the canal for commerce, the downtown district runs parallel to it. The district featured the Canal's barn, the Gaylord Store and Martin Elevator, the Norton Warehouse and Store, the Canal Office, and the Superintendent's Home.

Most buildings in the area were constructed with locally quarried limestone. The downtown area, aside from canal-related structures, was mostly used for commercial purposes. It was laid out by Joseph Wapler, the surveyor for the I&M Canal. The oldest buildings in the district today is the Canal Office (1838) and the building at 1020 State Street. The Canal Office was converted into the Will County Historical Society Headquarters and was listed on the National Register of Historic Places in 1972. An 1895 fire damaged the block between 10th and 11th streets east of State St. The district was added to the National Register of Historic Places on May 12, 1975.
