= John Heck House =

Historic house in Illinois, United States

- U.S. National Register of Historic Places
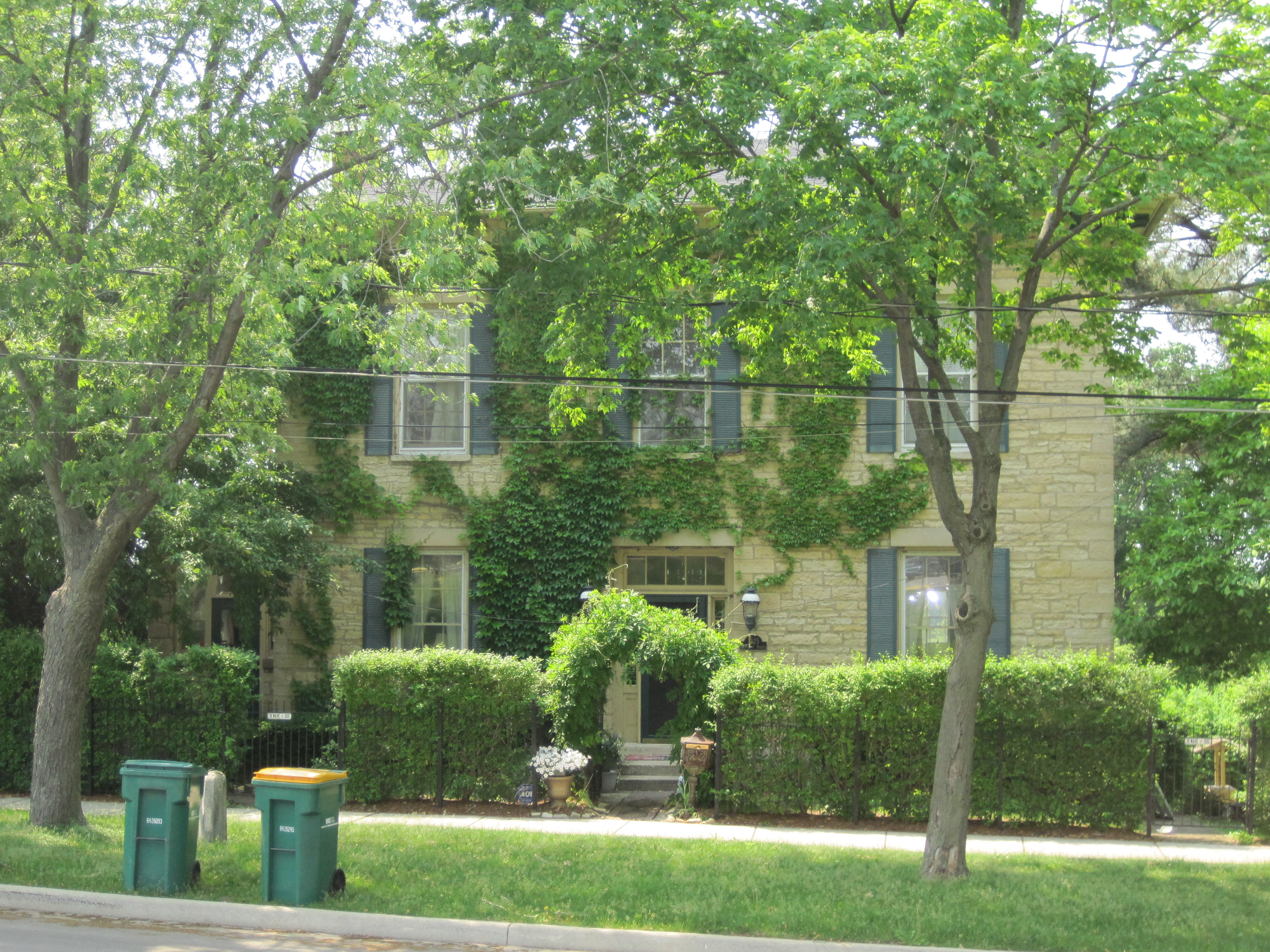
- The John Heck House in 2011

- Location within Illinois Location within the United States
- Location: 1225 South Hamilton Street; Lockport, Will County, Illinois, U.S.
- Coordinates: 41°35′7″N 88°3′29″W
- Built: c. 1867
- Architectural style: Greek Revival & Italianate
- NRHP reference No.: 94000978
- Added to NRHP: August 16, 1994

The John Heck House, also known as the Hauer Residence, is a historic residence in Lockport, Illinois.

== History ==
John Heck was a Canadian businessman who immigrated in 1838. John Heck was brought to Lockport to oversee the building of the I & M Canal. He mostly provided construction services, ranging from excavation to masonry. Heck purchased a tract of land for $9,000 in 1866; he likely organized the construction himself. His home was constructed from locally quarried limestone. It was constructed in the Greek Revival style, likely influenced by immigrants from New York City who first came to work on the canal. The house also prominently features Italianate details, which were mostly added in a remodeling in the 1870s. Heck died in 1890 and is buried in a local cemetery in Lockport at St. Joseph Church.

The residence passed to his niece, Georgina Alice Heck, who may have provided live-in support to John in his later years. Georgina sold the residence only three months later. It served as a boarding house in the 1920s, and was converted to an apartment building in the 1940s. The apartment rooms were later removed, and the house was listed on the National Register of Historic Places on August 16, 1994, by Jon Rawson. Since 1994, the home was sold to a Couple who turned it into a Bed & Breakfast, "The Liberty Inn" which was sold 3 years later to the Lindemann family.

== Architecture ==
The two-story house was built with locally quarried limestone. It is representative of the Greek Revival and Italianate styles. It was originally a square, but has since had two additions. The first addition was to the south side in the late 1860s, shortly after construction. A wood-frame addition, now covered in modern siding, was added to the rear (west) in 1946.
