= Gaylord Building =

- U.S. Historic district – Contributing property
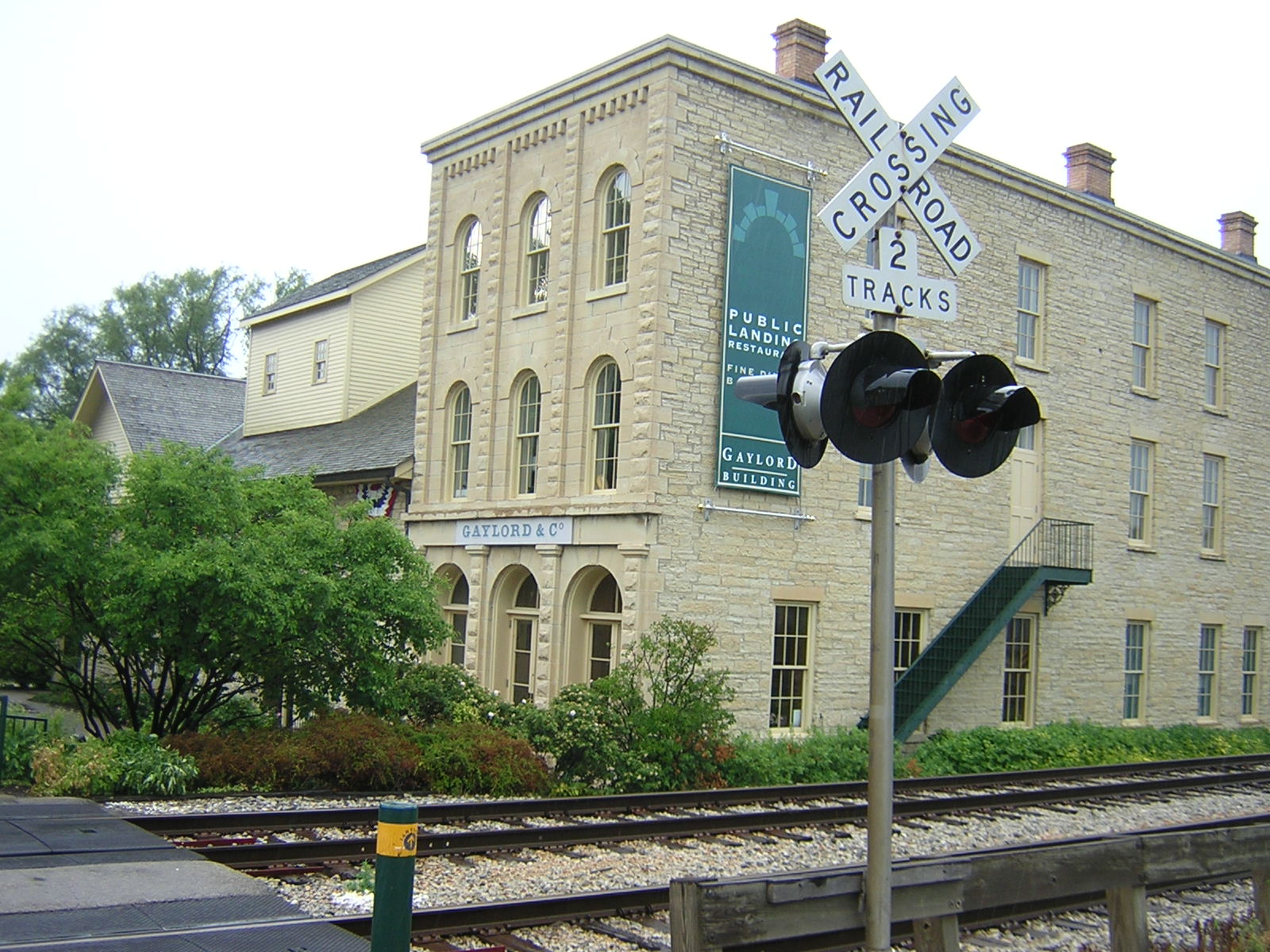
- The Gaylord Building

- Location within Illinois Location within the United States
- Interactive map showing the location of the Gaylord Building
- Location: Lockport, Illinois
- Coordinates: 41°35′27″N 88°3′28″W
- Built: 1838
- Architect: Erastus and William Newton
- Part of: Lockport Historic District (ID75000676)
- Added to NRHP: May 12, 1975

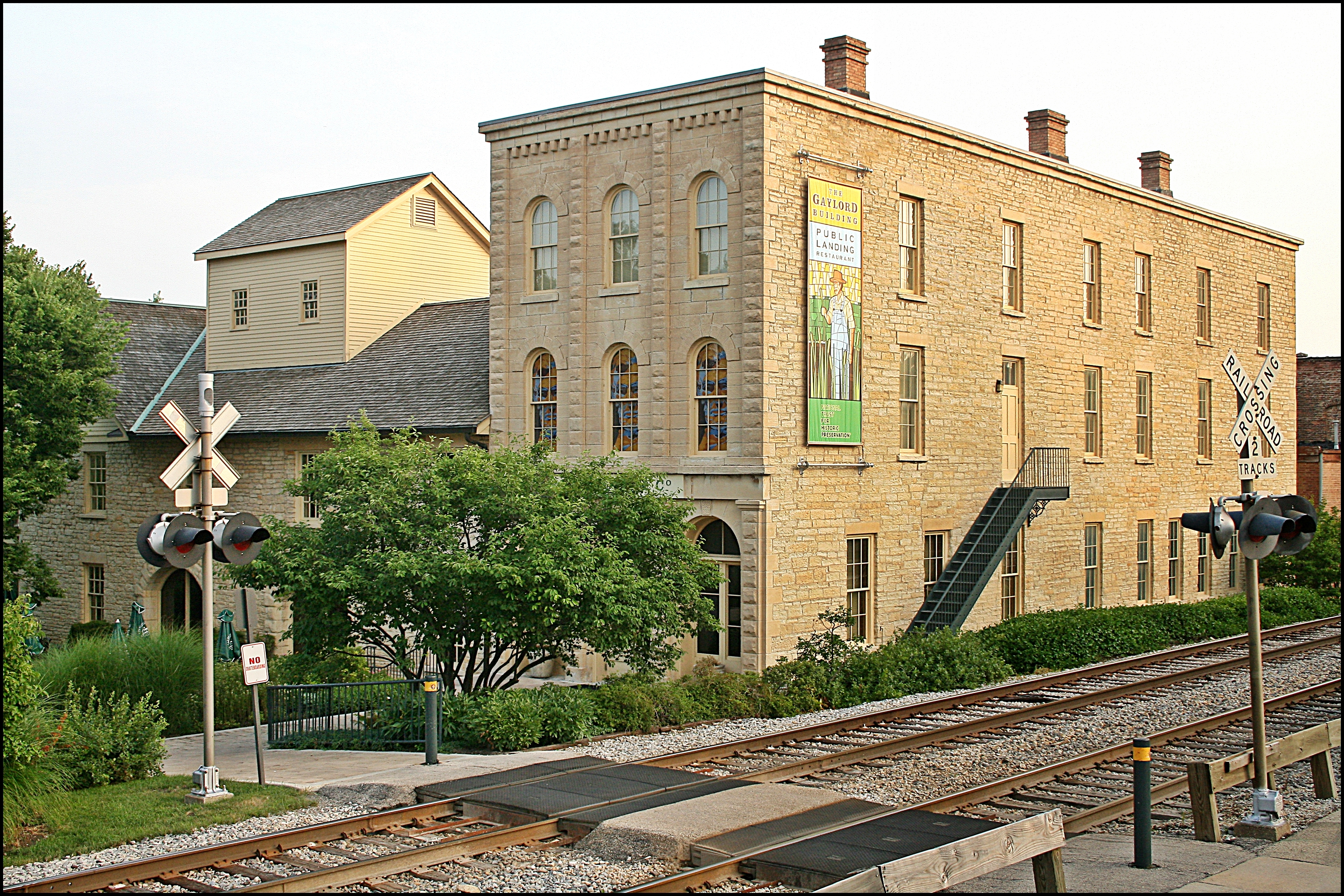
The east side of the Gaylord Building from across the Metra tracks. This view shows the 1859 addition to the building in the foreground. The pale yellow raised section in the background was a partial third story added to the original building in 1859.

The Gaylord Building, constructed in 1838 in the downtown historic district of Lockport, Illinois, and on the canalside there, played a pivotal role in the construction of the Illinois and Michigan Canal. It is on the United States National Register of Historic Places, and is one of 29 Historic Sites of the National Trust for Historic Preservation. It is constructed of yellow limestone, a common construction material in north central Illinois. It has an Italianate three story addition added in 1859. After falling into disrepair, it was the focus of a concerted restoration and preservation effort that began in 1983, which was later noted as setting a model for such efforts.

== Background and construction ==
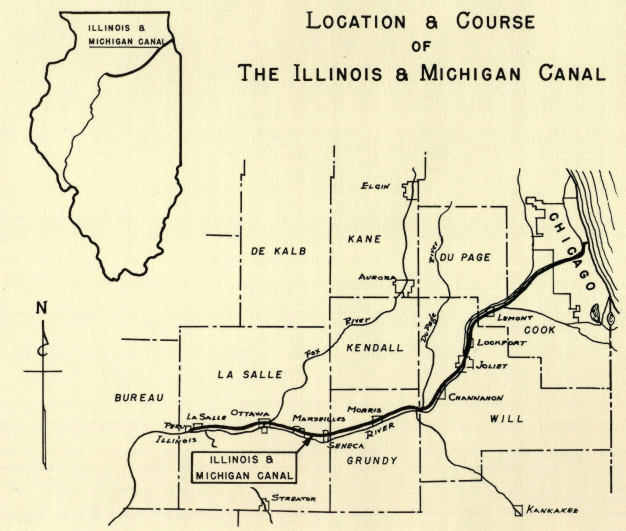
The location and course of the Illinois and Michigan Canal.

The Illinois and Michigan Canal, begun in 1836 and finished in 1848, and spanning 96 miles (154 km), was the last link in a waterway connecting the Great Lakes, the Gulf of Mexico via the Port of New Orleans and the Atlantic Ocean via the Port of New York. Lockport, situated about 1/3 of the way from the starting point (the Bridgeport neighborhood in Chicago on the Chicago River) and the end point (LaSalle, Illinois on the Illinois River), was a natural location for canal planning, staging and warehousing operations. The I&M canal headquarters were thus in Lockport.

Little progress on canal construction was made during the first two years, due to difficulties in securing supplies and manpower, most of which had to be brought from the East Coast. In the 1830s, this far west, most areas, even a few miles out from major settlements such as Chicago, were essentially wilderness, and Lockport had no warehouse large enough to house all the materials shipped in to foster canal construction, so the canal authorities decided to build one. There was some controversy at the time over the use of state funds to pay for it.

The choice of material used, given the frontier nature of the town, was surprising to some. However this area of Illinois has large deposits of yellow limestone, in some cases just below the surface. Some sources say the building uses some stone taken directly from the canal excavation. The building was constructed between May and September 1838 under the supervision of acting Canal Commissioner Jacob Fry at a cost of US$4,014.29, a substantial sum at the time. Use of yellow limestone may have started a trend.

== Warehouse ==
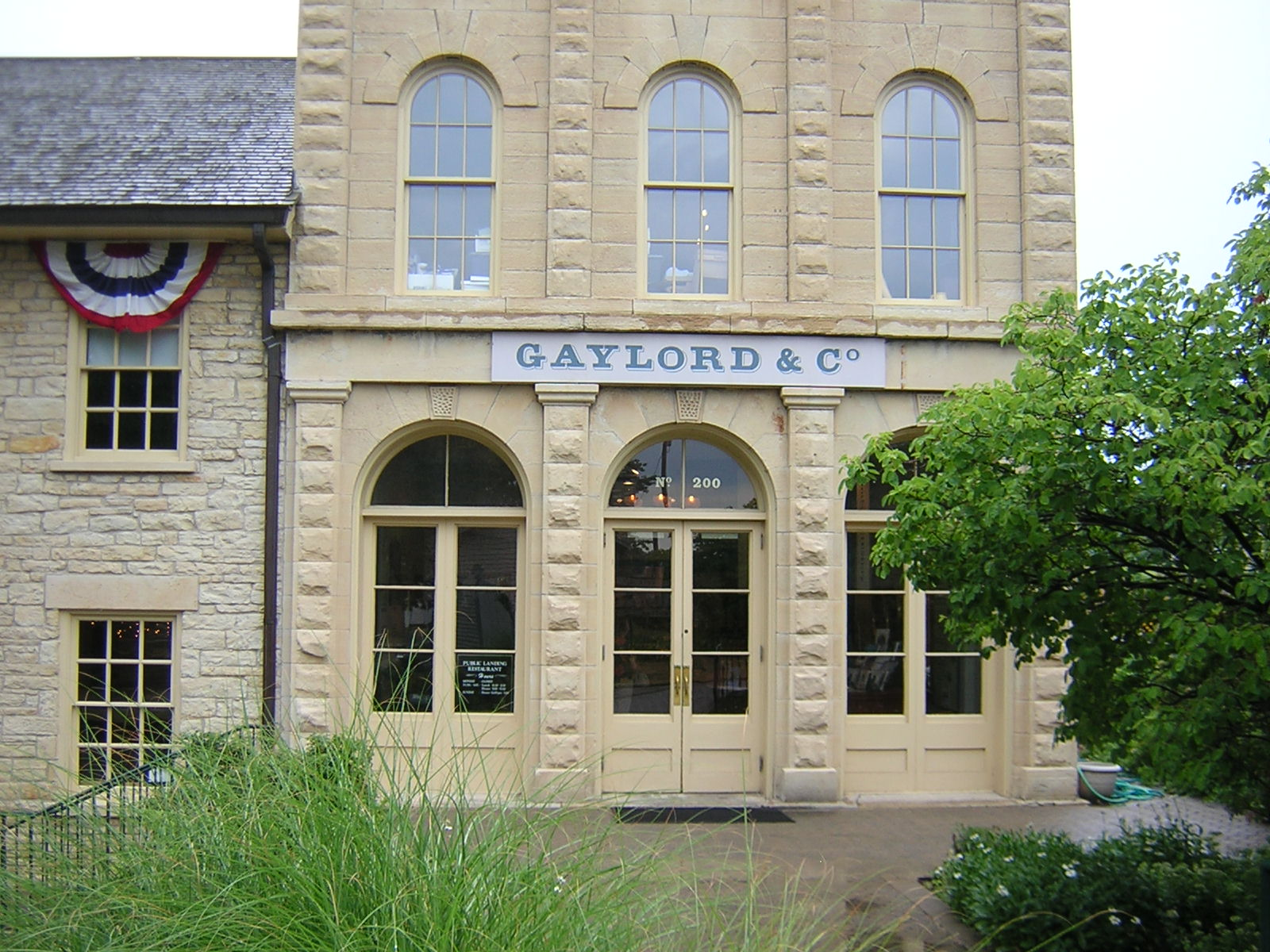
A side-by-side view of the original building (on the left) and the 1859 addition showing the dramatic difference in architectural styles.

On completion of the canal in 1848 the building was surplus to requirements, so the Canal Board of Trustees briefly rented, and then sold, the building. It passed through a number of owners, but was owned for a long period in the mid-19th century by George Gaylord (1820–1883), a prominent Lockport merchant, Shortly after Gaylord's death Norton & Company, who owned other properties in Lockport, bought the building for $7,500. The many warehouses in Lockport were quite busy.

The 1859 addition was in a significantly different style. The property continued to change hands, going through many uses, as a warehouse, machine shop, foundry, printing facility, and finally (with an addition of a third story on the original section) a plumbing supply warehouse.

== Restoration ==
In 1983 Gaylord Donnelley, George Gaylord's multimillionaire grandson and the retired chairman of Chicago's R. R. Donnelley & Sons publishing house, became interested in the building (reportedly on the urging of his niece). He formed a private development company, The Gaylord Lockport Company, named for Donnelley's grandfather, and spent four years and $2.8 million restoring the derelict building to its former beauty, including removing the third story and restoring the roofline as it was in 1859.

At the same time, impetus was growing for the creation of a Heritage Corridor to document, preserve and interpret the I&M Canal, and in 1984 President Ronald Reagan signed the legislation to create it. In 1987 the building opened to the public, featuring the Public Landing restaurant and a museum featuring canal exhibits. Reagan recognized the Gaylord Building and the project by personally presenting Mr. Donnelley with a President's Award for Historic Preservation, and the project and became a model for preserving historic sites for new uses.

== Management and location ==
The National Trust for Historic Preservation owns the Gaylord Building and the Gaylord Building Historic Site, a nonprofit organization, manages it as part of the Lockport National Historic District . The building is a hub of canal exhibits, tours and programs. Enjoy a curated collection of local, national, and international art in Gallery Seven located on the second floor of the Gaylord Building, followed by upscale casual dining in the Public Landing Restaurant or on the Gaylord Building's patio. The canal trail runs past the building along the old canal towpath, and it leads visitors to other parts of historic downtown Lockport, including the Norton Building, home to the Illinois State Museum Lockport Gallery.
