= John Lennox =

British mathematician, philosopher of science, and theologian (born 1943)

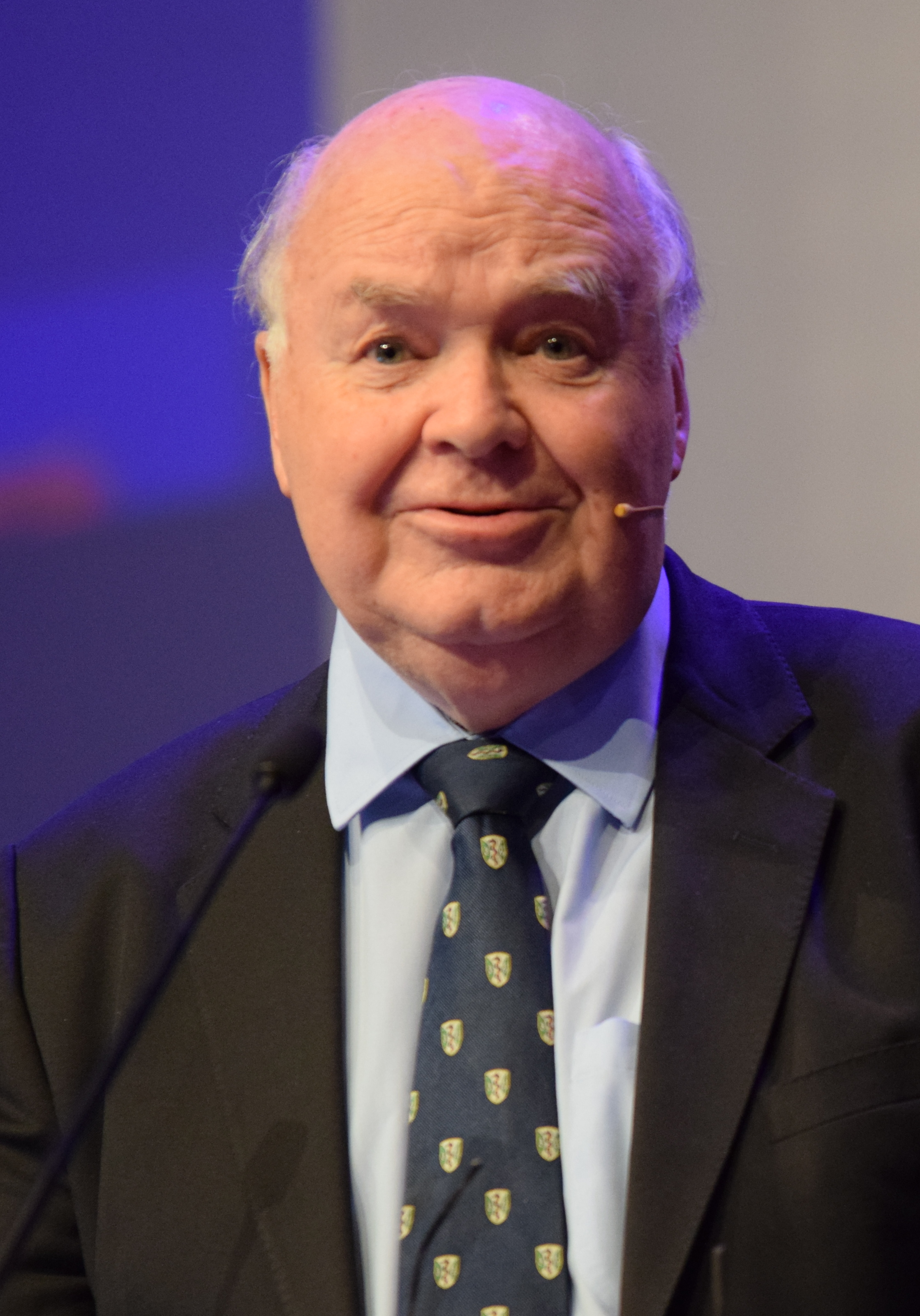
- Lennox in 2015
- Born: John Carson Lennox; 7 November 1943 (age 83); Belfast, Northern Ireland, United Kingdom
- Education: University of Cambridge (MA, MMath, PhD); University of Oxford (MA, DPhil); Cardiff University (DSc); University of Surrey (MA)
- Spouse: Sally Lennox
- Children: 3
- Scientific career
- Fields: Abstract algebra; Group theory
- Workplaces: University of Wales; University of Oxford
- Thesis: Centrality and Permutability in Soluble Groups (1969)
- Doctoral advisor: James Roseblade
- Website: www.johnlennox.org

John Carson Lennox (born 7 November 1943) is a Northern Irish mathematician, bioethicist, and lay theologian. He has written many books on religion, ethics, the relationship between science and God (such as Has Science Buried God and Can Science Explain Everything); he has also participated in public debates with atheists, including Richard Dawkins and Christopher Hitchens.

Lennox earned a doctorate in mathematics from the University of Cambridge, followed by second and third doctorates from the University of Oxford and Cardiff University, respectively. As a professor, Lennox specialised in group theory. He is emeritus professor of Mathematics at the University of Oxford, where he is also Emeritus Fellow in Mathematics and Philosophy of Science at Green Templeton College, and has worked as adjunct lecturer at Wycliffe Hall and at the Oxford Centre for Christian Apologetics. He is also an Associate Fellow of the Saïd Business School and a Senior Fellow at the Trinity Forum.

== Early life and education ==
John Carson Lennox was born on 7 November 1943 in Belfast and brought up in Armagh, where his father ran a store. He attended The Royal School, Armagh, and went on to become Exhibitioner and Senior Scholar at Emmanuel College, Cambridge, where in 1962, he also attended the last lectures of C. S. Lewis on the poet John Donne. Lennox obtained a Master of Arts, a Master of Mathematics and a Doctor of Philosophy from the University of Cambridge with the dissertation Centrality and Permutability in Soluble Groups (1970).

Lennox was awarded a Doctor of Science degree in mathematics by Cardiff University in 1993 for his research. Lennox also holds a Doctor of Philosophy degree from the University of Oxford (by incorporation) and an M.A. degree in bioethics at the University of Surrey. In addition, he was a Humboldt Fellow at the University of Würzburg and the University of Freiburg.

== Career ==
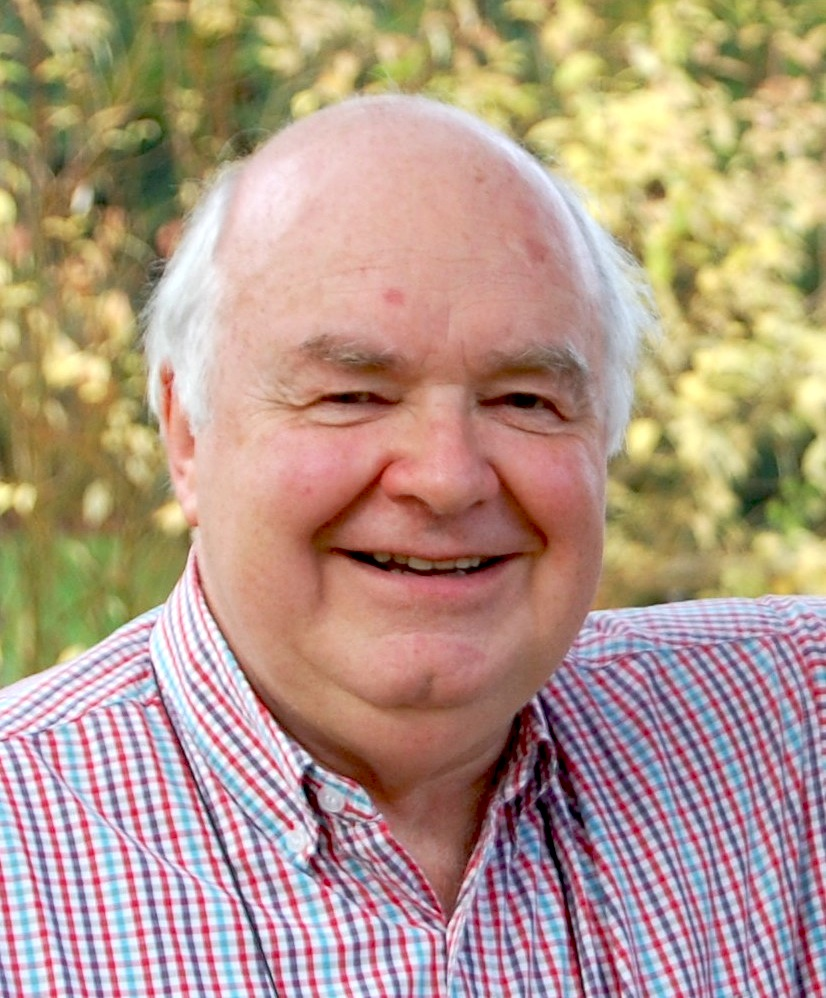
Lennox in 2008

Upon completing his doctorate, Lennox moved to Cardiff, Wales, becoming a reader in Mathematics at the University of Wales, Cardiff. Lennox is currently the President of OCCA (The Oxford Centre for Christian Apologetics). He also teaches science and religion in the University of Oxford. During his 29 years in Cardiff he spent a year at each of the universities of Würzburg, Freiburg (as an Alexander von Humboldt Fellow), and Vienna, and has lectured extensively in both Eastern and Western Europe, Russia, and North America on mathematics, apologetics, and the exposition of scripture.

Lennox is the author of a number of books on the relations between science, religion, and ethics. He has published over 70 peer-reviewed articles on mathematics, co-authored two Oxford Mathematical Monographs, and worked as a translator of Russian mathematics.

He has spoken in many different countries, in conferences and as an academic fellow, including numerous trips to the former Soviet Union.

On 14 March 2012, he presented an edition of the Lent Talks for BBC Radio Four. Lennox has also given lectures at the Veritas Forum on topics such as the relationship between science and religion, the existence of God, doubt, and the problems of evil and suffering. Additionally, he is a Senior Fellow of the Trinity Forum, a Christian nonprofit organisation that develops leaders to make contributions to cultural renewal.

=== Debates ===
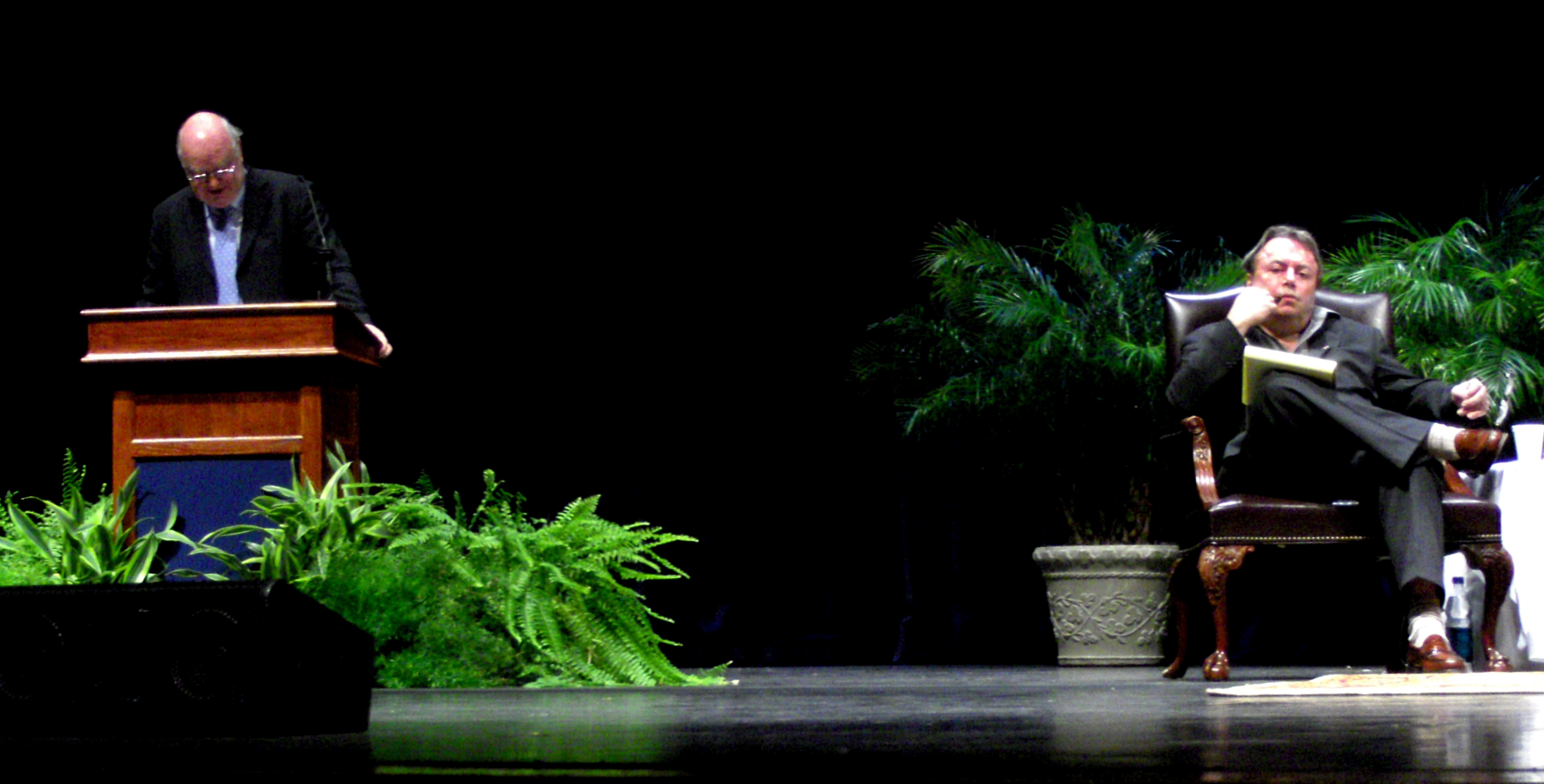
Lennox (left) debating religion with Christopher Hitchens in Alabama, March 2009

Lennox has been part of numerous public debates defending the Christian faith, including debates with Christopher Hitchens, Michael Shermer, Richard Dawkins, Lawrence Krauss, Peter Atkins, Victor Stenger, Michael Tooley, Stephen Law, and Peter Singer.

- On 3 October 2007, Lennox debated Richard Dawkins at the Samford University in Birmingham, Alabama, on Dawkins's views expressed in his book The God Delusion.
- Lennox and Dawkins had a discussion in April 2008 at Trinity College, Oxford, to expand upon topics left undeveloped during The God Delusion Debate.
- On 9 August 2008, Lennox debated Christopher Hitchens at the Edinburgh International Festival in Edinburgh, Scotland, on the question of whether Europe should jettison its religious past and welcome the "New Atheism".
- On 23 August 2008, Lennox debated Michael Shermer at the Wesley Conference Centre in Sydney, Australia, on the existence of God.
- On 21 October 2008, Lennox again debated Dawkins at the Oxford University Museum of Natural History, the site of the 1860 Oxford evolution debate between Thomas Henry Huxley and Samuel Wilberforce. The debate was titled "Has Science Buried God?". The Spectator called the event "Huxley-Wilberforce, Round Two."
- On 3 March 2009, Lennox debated Hitchens for the second time at Samford University in Birmingham, Alabama, on the question "Is God Great?" The debate addressed the validity of some of Hitchens' claims in his book God is Not Great.
- On 20 July 2011, Lennox debated Peter Singer at the Melbourne Town Hall in Melbourne, Australia, on the topic "Is There a God?"
- In August 2021, Lennox was the chief guest for Malhar Fest, hosted by St. Xavier's College, Mumbai.

== Personal life ==
Lennox speaks English, Russian, French, Spanish, and German. He is married to Sally and has three children and ten grandchildren. He has a brother named Gilbert Lennox, previously an elder in Glenabbey Church, Glengormley. The hymn writer and recording artist Kristyn Getty, Gilbert's daughter, is Lennox's niece.

== Works ==
- Lennox, John C.; Stonehewer, Stewart E. (1987). Subnormal subgroups of groups. Oxford: Clarendon. ISBN 978-0-19-853552-2.
- ———; Gooding, David W. (1997). Key Bible Concepts. Port Colborne: Gospel Folio Press. ISBN 9781882701414.
- ———; Gooding, David W. (1997). Christianity: Opium or Truth?. Port Colborne: Gospel Folio Press. ISBN 9781882701469.
- ———; Gooding, David W. (2001). The Definition of Christianity. Port Colborne: Gospel Folio Press. ISBN 9781882701421.
- ———; Robinson, Derek J. S. (2004). The Theory of Infinite Soluble Groups. Clarendon Press. p. 458. ISBN 978-0-19-850728-4.
- ——— (2009). God's Undertaker: Has Science Buried God? (Updated ed.). Oxford, UK: Lion Hudson PLC. pp. 224. ISBN 978-0-7459-5371-7.
- ——— (2011). Seven Days That Divide the World: The Beginning According to Genesis and Science. Zondervan. p. 192. ISBN 978-0-310-49217-7.
- ——— (2011). God and Stephen Hawking: Whose Design Is It Anyway? (1st ed.). Lion UK. p. 96. ISBN 978-0-7459-5549-0.
- ——— (2011). Gunning for God: A Critique of the New Atheism (1st ed.). Lion UK. p. 248. ISBN 978-0-7459-5322-9.
- ———; Gooding, David W. (2015). The Bible & Ethics. Myrtlefield Encounters. Vol. 4. Ontario: Myrtlefield House. ISBN 978-1874584575.
- ——— (2015). Against the Flow: The Inspiration of Daniel in an Age of Relativism (1st ed.). Monarch Books. p. 416. ISBN 978-0857216212.
- ——— (2017). Determined to Believe: The Sovereignty of God, Freedom, Faith, and Human Responsibility (1st ed.). Monarch Books. p. 352. ISBN 978-0857218728.
- ———; Gooding, David W. (2018). Being Truly Human: The Limits of Our Worth, Power, Freedom and Destiny. The Quest for Reality and Significance. Vol. 1. Belfast: Myrtlefield House. ISBN 978-1912721016.
- ———; Gooding, David W. (2018). Finding Ultimate Reality: In Search of the Best Answers to the Biggest Questions. The Quest for Reality and Significance. Vol. 2. Belfast: Myrtlefield House. ISBN 978-1912721061.
- ———; Gooding, David W. (2019). Questioning Our Knowledge: Can We Know What We Need to Know?. The Quest for Reality and Significance. Vol. 3. Belfast: Myrtlefield House. ISBN 978-1912721115.
- ———; Gooding, David W. (2019). Doing What's Right: The Limits of Our Worth, Power, Freedom and Destiny. The Quest for Reality and Significance. Vol. 4. Belfast: Myrtlefield House. ISBN 978-1912721214.
- ———; Gooding, David W. (2019). Claiming to Answer: How One Person Became the Response to Our Deepest Questions. The Quest for Reality and Significance. Vol. 5. Belfast: Myrtlefield House. ISBN 978-1912721269.
- ———; Gooding, David W. (2019). Suffering Life's Pain: Facing the Problems of Moral and Natural Evil. The Quest for Reality and Significance. Vol. 6. Belfast: Myrtlefield House. ISBN 978-1912721160.
- ——— (2019). Can Science Explain Everything?. The Good Book Company. ISBN 978-1784984113.
- ——— (2019). Joseph: A Story of Love, Hate, Slavery, Power, and Forgiveness. Crossway. ISBN 9781433562969.
- Lennox, John (April 2020). Where is God in A Coronavirus World?. The Good Book Company. ISBN 9781784985691.
- Lennox, John (2020). 2084: Artificial Intelligence and the Future of Humanity. Zondervan. ISBN 9780310109563.
- Lennox, John (2021). Cosmic Chemistry: Do God and Science Mix?. Lion Books. ISBN 9780745981406.
- Lennox, John C. (2026). My Story: A spiritual and intellectual autobiography. SPCK Publishing. ISBN 9780281091973.
