= Robert Milne House =

Historic house in Illinois, United States

- U.S. National Register of Historic Places
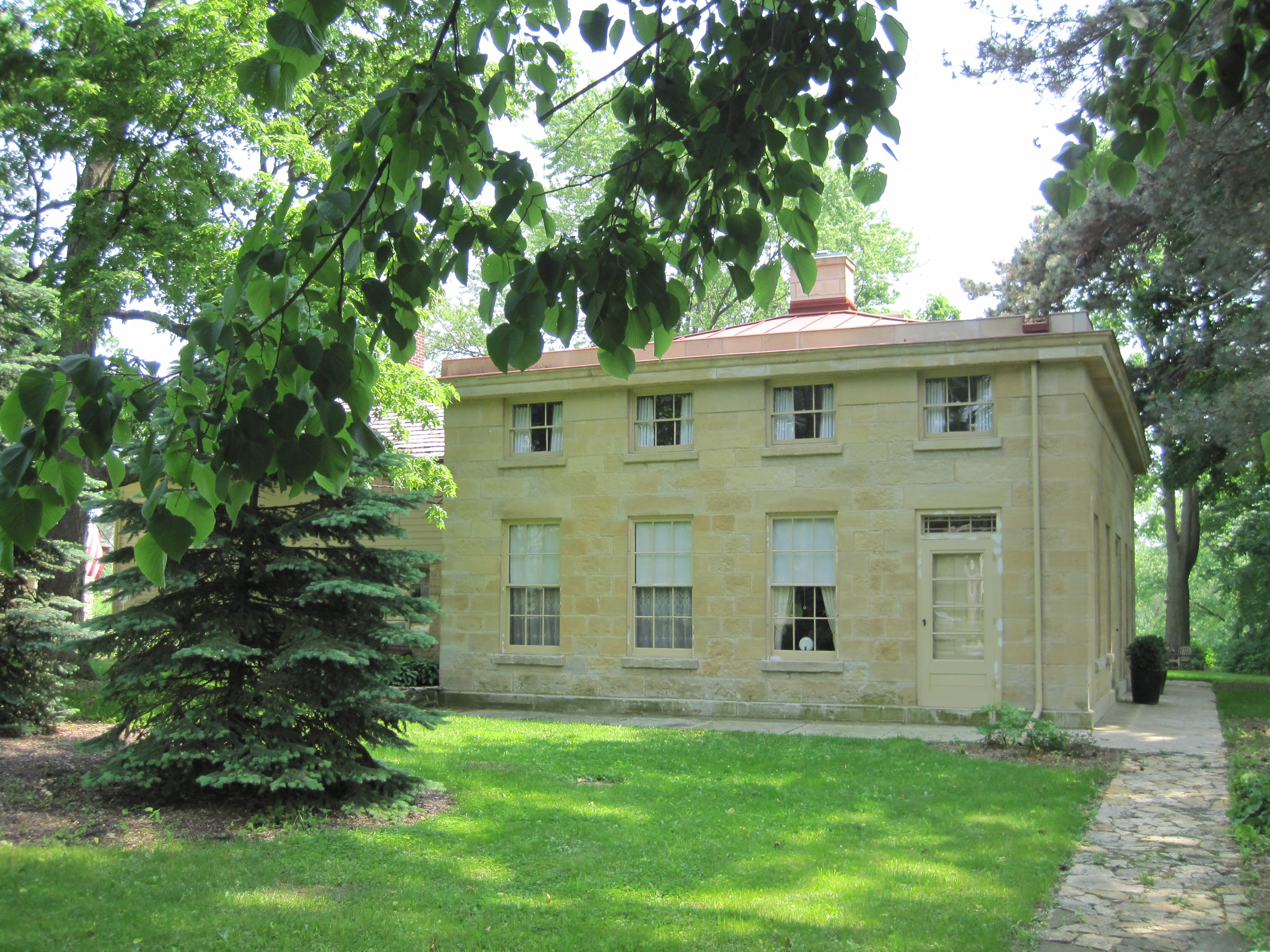

- Location within Illinois Location within the United States
- Interactive map showing the location of the Milne House
- Location: 535 E. 7th St., Lockport, Illinois
- Coordinates: 41°35′22″N 88°2′57″W
- Area: 2 acres (0.81 ha)
- Built: 1840
- Architect: Robert Milne
- Architectural style: Greek Revival
- NRHP reference No.: 79000876
- Added to NRHP: December 17, 1979

The Robert Milne House is a historic residence in Lockport, Illinois, United States. It was home to Robert Milne, Canal Commissioner of the Illinois and Michigan Canal.

== History ==
Robert Milne was a mason from Banffshire, Scotland who immigrated to Chicago in 1836. In 1840, he was commissioned to build five of the locks on the Illinois and Michigan Canal (I&M Canal) and moved to its headquarters in Lockport, Illinois. He purchased a 240-acre (97 ha) lot and constructed a farm upon it, calling it "Kelvyn Grove". The land had been platted as the town of East Lockport, but had never been developed. He briefly lived in Chicago in 1849 before returning to Lockport. In 1854, he sold his Chicago business interests to focus on the canal and his ranch. Milne was promoted to Canal Commissioner by Illinois Governor John M. Palmer in 1869. Milne was also one of the first breeders of Shorthorn cattle in the United States. Four generations of the Milne family lived on the farmstead, owning the house until 1979. Most of the land that was previously on the farm is now owned by the Lockport school district although the house itself is a private residence. The house was listed on the National Register of Historic Places on December 17, 1979.

== Architecture ==
The Robert Milne house stands two stories tall and is built with locally quarried limestone. It is generally Greek Revival in design. The main section is rectangular and has cut stone facades and a stone cornice. There are two interior brick chimneys. The street facade is four bays wide while the backyard facade is five bays. A bracket porch and two rear additions were built after 1873. The property also includes a stone milk house and a well. A modern frame garage is also on the property.
