= Homer Glen, Illinois =

- Village
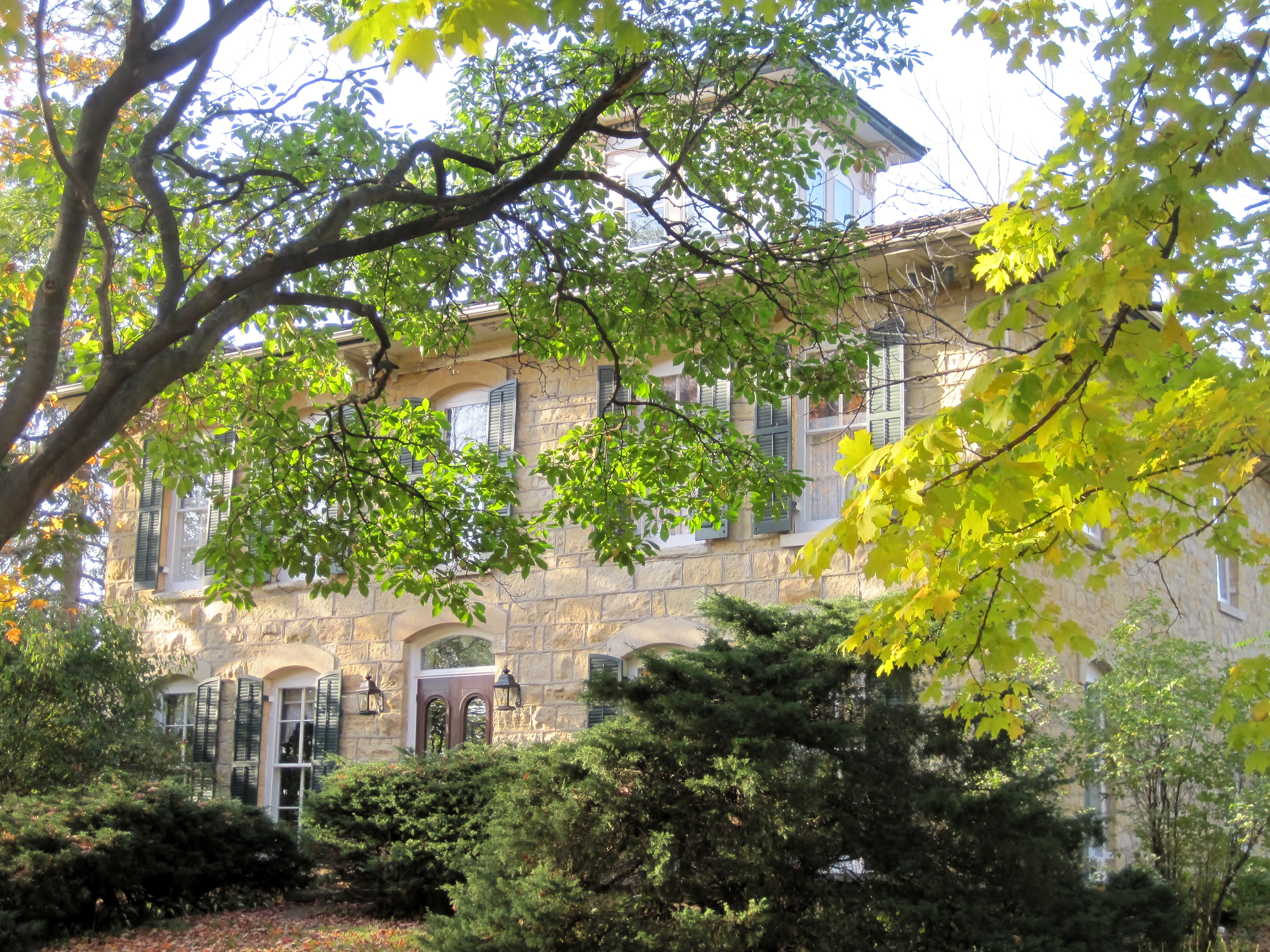
- Stone Manor in Homer Glen is listed on the National Register of Historic Places

- Flag Seal Logo

- Location within Will & Cook Counties and Illinois
- Coordinates: 41°37′22″N 87°58′29″W
- Country: United States
- State: Illinois
- County: Will, Cook
- Township: Homer, New Lenox, Orland
- Incorporated: April 17, 2001

Government
  - Type: Council–manager
  - Mayor: Christina Neitzke-Troike

Area
  - Total: 22.17 sq mi (57.41 km^{2})
  - Land: 22.12 sq mi (57.30 km^{2})
  - Water: 0.039 sq mi (0.10 km^{2})
- Elevation: 764 ft (233 m)

Population (2020)
  - Total: 24,543
  - Density: 1,109/sq mi (428.3/km^{2})
- Time zone: UTC−6 (CST)
  - Summer (DST): UTC−5 (CDT)
- ZIP Code: 60491
- Area code: 708/464, 815/779
- FIPS code: 17-35835
- GNIS ID: 2398535
- Website: homerglenil.org

Homer Glen is a village in Will County, Illinois, United States, with a small portion in Cook County. As of the 2020 census, its population was 24,543. It is located 32 miles (51 km) southwest of downtown Chicago, IL.

== History ==
The area that is now Homer Glen was formerly known as Goodings Grove.

The current village was incorporated on April 17, 2001.

== Demographics ==
Homer Glen first appeared as a village in the 2010 United States census.

Historical population
Census	Pop.	Note	%±
2010	24,220		—
2020	24,543		1.3%
U.S. Decennial Census; 2010 2020

=== Racial and ethnic composition ===
Homer Glen village, Illinois – Racial and ethnic composition Note: the US Census treats Hispanic/Latino as an ethnic category. This table excludes Latinos from the racial categories and assigns them to a separate category. Hispanics/Latinos may be of any race.
Race / Ethnicity (NH = Non-Hispanic)	Pop 2010	Pop 2020	% 2010	% 2020
White alone (NH)	22,215	21,750	91.72%	88.62%
Black or African American alone (NH)	134	198	0.55%	0.81%
Native American or Alaska Native alone (NH)	14	12	0.06%	0.05%
Asian alone (NH)	422	406	1.74%	1.65%
Native Hawaiian or Pacific Islander alone (NH)	4	1	0.02%	0.00%
Other race alone (NH)	25	31	0.10%	0.13%
Mixed race or Multiracial (NH)	217	575	0.90%	2.34%
Hispanic or Latino (any race)	1,189	1,570	4.91%	6.40%
Total	24,220	24,543	100.00%	100.00%

=== 2020 census ===
As of the 2020 census, Homer Glen had a population of 24,543. The median age was 44.7 years. 21.7% of residents were under the age of 18 and 20.7% were age 65 or older. For every 100 females there were 98.3 males, and for every 100 females age 18 and over there were 97.4 males age 18 and over.

95.4% of residents lived in urban areas, while 4.6% lived in rural areas.

There were 8,503 households, of which 32.5% had children under age 18 living in them. Of all households, 72.0% were married-couple households, 10.0% were households with a male householder and no spouse or partner present, and 15.1% were households with a female householder and no spouse or partner present. About 15.7% of households were made up of individuals, and 10.4% had someone living alone who was age 65 or older.

There were 8,716 housing units, of which 2.4% were vacant. The homeowner vacancy rate was 0.7% and the rental vacancy rate was 5.5%.

=== 2010 census ===
As of the 2010 census, there were 24,220 residents. The racial composition of the city was:

- 95.5% White (91.7% non-Hispanic whites);
- 0.6% Black or African American;
- 1.0% from some other race;
- 1.7% Asian
- 1.1% from two or more races.

Homer Glen has a Hispanic or Latino population of 4.9%.

Homer Glen has significant Polish, Lithuanian, and Serbian populations.

== Arts and culture ==
The Homer Township Public Library is located in Homer Glen. Established in 1982, it serves all of Homer Township.

== Parks and recreation ==
Parks and athletic clubs include the Homer Athletic Club, Homer Stallions Football and Lacrosse, Homer Heat Baseball, Illinois Crush Baseball, Lockport Homer Swim Club, Homer Hawks soccer, and Homer Glen Heroes Trail.

== Government ==
The government of Homer Glen is run by the mayor and village president, clerk, and six trustees. The mayor and village president are elected to four-year terms, and are term-limited to two terms.

Christina Neitzke-Troike is the mayor and village president.

=== Historical list of mayors and village presidents ===
Name	Term start	Term end	Political Party
Russ Petrizzo	2001 (appointed)	2003	Independent
Russ Petrizzo	2003	2007	Independent
Jim Daley Jr.	2007	2011	Independent
Jim Daley Jr.	2011	2015	Independent
George Yukich	2015	2019	The "Yukich" Slate
George Yukich	2019	2023	Independent
Christina Neitzke-Troike	2023	2027	Integrity for Homer Glen

== Education ==
Homer Community Consolidated School District 33C serves most of the community, and Will County School District 92 serves the remainder.

There are two grade school districts and one high school district serving the village. Lockport Township High School, District 205, is the public high school serving the village.

== Media ==
Homer Glen is part of the Chicago metropolitan area media market for television, radio, and newspaper coverage.

The Homer Horizon newspaper had a circulation of approximately 13,400 in Homer Glen and neighboring Lockport before ceasing operations in 2020.

== Infrastructure ==
Pace provides bus service.

Law enforcement is provided by the Will County Sheriff's Office.

== See also ==
- List of towns and villages in Illinois
