= Dutton-Small House =

Historic house in Maine, United States

- U.S. National Register of Historic Places
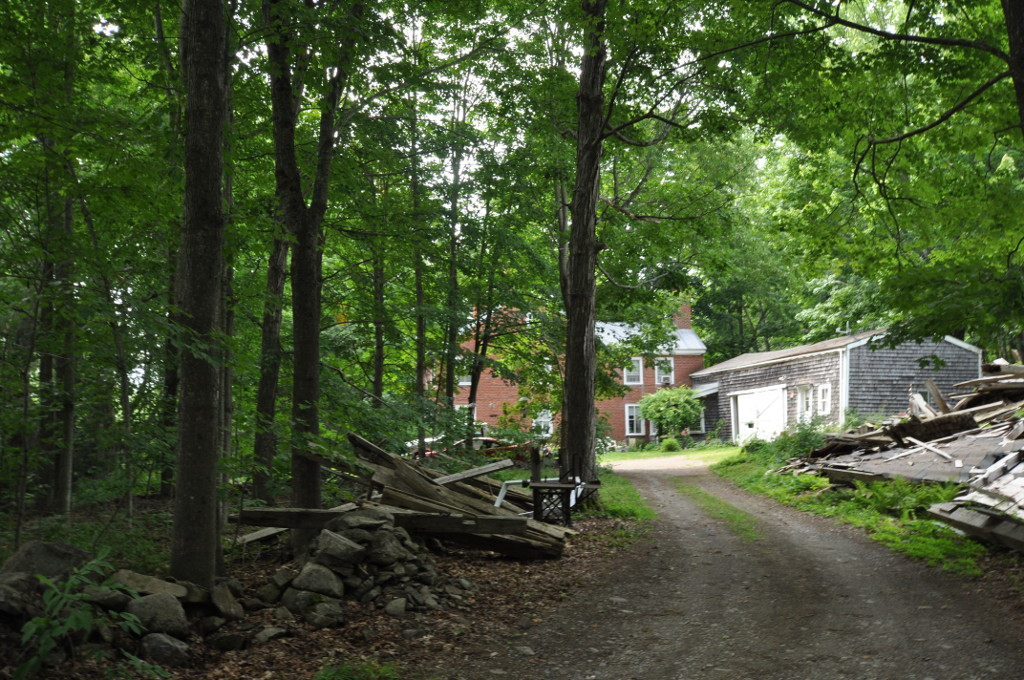

- Location within Maine Location within the United States
- Location: Bog Road, Vassalboro, Maine
- Coordinates: 44°26′22″N 69°39′15″W
- Area: 1.5 acres (0.61 ha)
- Built: 1825
- Architectural style: Federal
- NRHP reference No.: 90001907
- Added to NRHP: December 18, 1990

The Dutton-Small House is a historic house on Bog Road in Vassalboro, Maine. Built about 1825, it is one of the rural community's oldest buildings, and one of its only brick houses. It was listed on the National Register of Historic Places in 1990.

== Description and history ==
The house stands in rural central Vassalboro, on the north side of Bog Road, a short way west of its junction with Weber Pond Road. It is a 2 1/2-story brick structure, with a side gable roof and end chimneys. Its main facade is five bays wide, with sash windows set in rectangular openings, and the centered entrance flanked by sidelight windows and topped by a Federal style semi-oval fan. An ell extends to the rear, and a second ell extends right (east) from that one, not quite reaching to the property's 19th-century barn. The interior of the house is arranged in an unusual variant of the center hall plan. It has a narrow central stair, and the hall does not extend to the back of the house. Instead, the stair is flanked by parlor and living room, with a large chamber extending across the back of the main block. It retains original Federal period woodwork that is relatively modest in style.

The house was probably built in 1825, a date found on the staircase's newel post cap. The builder, John Dutton, was a local real estate speculator who purchased the land on which it stands in 1815. He sold it, with house, in 1832 to Ezekial Small. It is one of the few brick houses in the community, and the most intact of those from the 19th century.

== See also ==
- National Register of Historic Places listings in Kennebec County, Maine
