= Small house (Zimbabwe) =

Small House is a Zimbabwean expression describing an extramarital affair or a party involved in one. It usually describes girlfriends of a married male, a reflection of the polygamous history of the country. Because of Zimbabwe's economic hardships, many men have been forced to abandon costly multiple relationships, which has led to a significant drop in the country's HIV rate in recent years.

There is a soap opera in Zimbabwe based on this phenomenon called Small House Saga. The Smaller House, a purely literary work, has been praised not only for its thorough exploration of the subject, but also, for how it challenges stereotypes associated with small houses such as the general view that women who become such do so for financial reasons.
