= Peotone, Illinois =

Peotone
- Village
- Village of Peotone
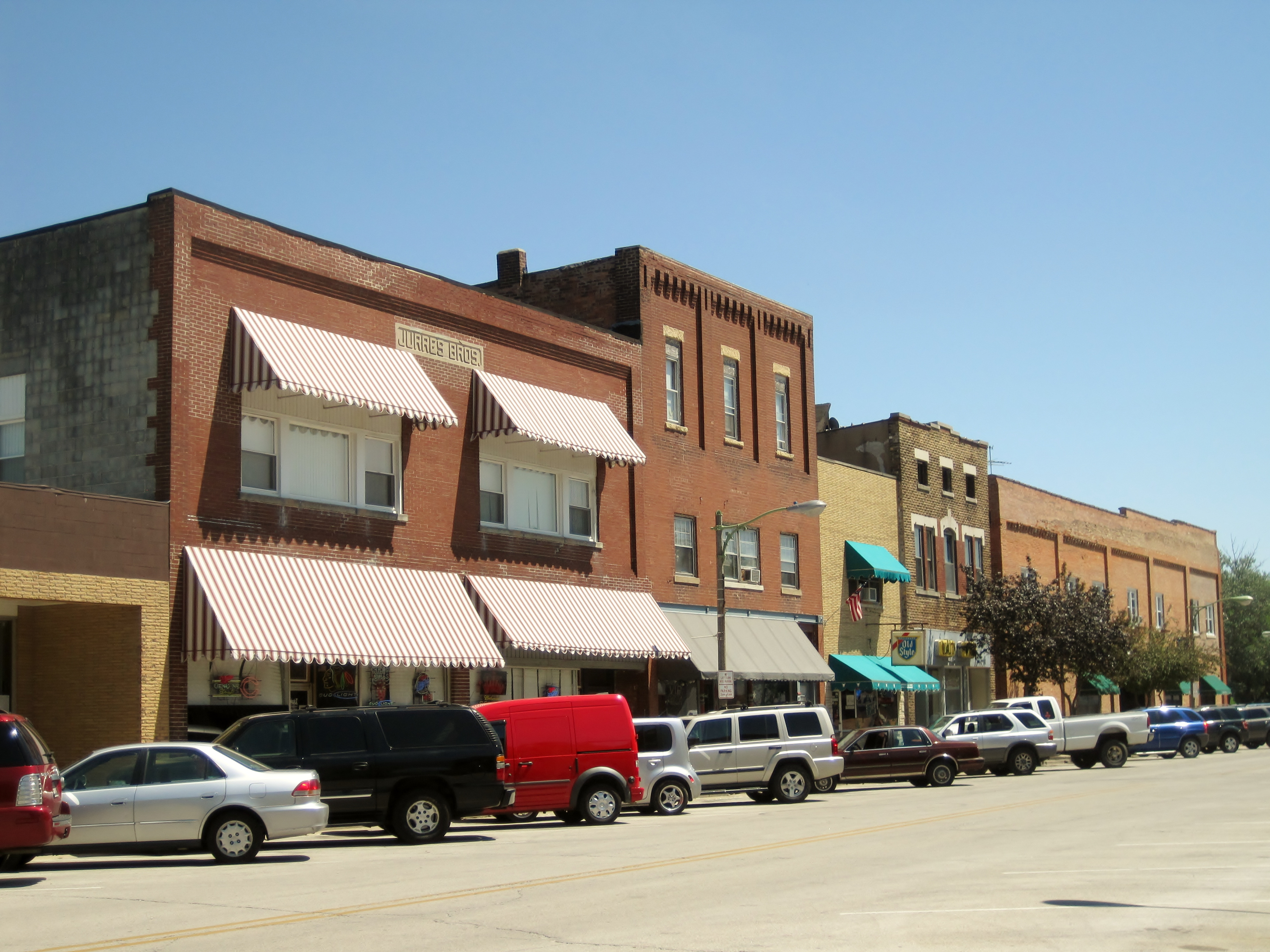
- Downtown Peotone Historic District
- Motto: A nice place to live.
- Location of Peotone in Will County, Illinois.

- Location of Illinois in the United States
- Coordinates: 41°19′46″N 87°47′42″W
- Country: United States
- State: Illinois
- County: Will
- Township: Peotone

Government
  - Mayor: Chris Vieaux

Area
  - Total: 2.03 sq mi (5.25 km^{2})
  - Land: 2.00 sq mi (5.18 km^{2})
  - Water: 0.027 sq mi (0.07 km^{2})

Population (2020)
  - Total: 4,150
  - Density: 2,073.9/sq mi (800.74/km^{2})
- Time zone: UTC-6 (CST)
  - Summer (DST): UTC-5 (CDT)
- ZIP Code(s): 60468
- Area code: 708
- FIPS code: 17-59052
- Website: villageofpeotone.com

Peotone (/ˈpiːətoʊn/) is a village in Will County, Illinois, United States. As of the 2020 census, Peotone had a population of 4,150. The city is about 43 miles (69 km) south of Chicago. The village is home to the Peotone High School Blue Devils.

== History ==
Peotone is a name derived from the Potawatomi language meaning 'come here'.

=== Registered historic places ===
- Downtown Peotone Historic District
- Peotone Mill

== Geography ==
Peotone is located at 41°19′46″N 87°47′42″W (41.329445, -87.795138).

According to the 2010 census, Peotone has a total area of 1.873 square miles (4.85 km^{2}), of which 1.87 square miles (4.84 km^{2}) (or 99.84%) is land and 0.003 square miles (0.01 km^{2}) (or 0.16%) is water.

Main roads are Illinois Route 50, Interstate 57, Wilmington-Peotone Road, Rathje Road, and Joliet Road.

Peotone is about nine miles west of Beecher, six miles north of Manteno, six miles south of Monee and is approximately 20 miles east of Wilmington.

== Demographics ==
Historical population
Census	Pop.	Note	%±
1880	623		—
1890	716		14.9%
1900	1,002		39.9%
1910	1,206		20.4%
1920	1,089		−9.7%
1930	1,153		5.9%
1940	1,145		−0.7%
1950	1,394		21.7%
1960	1,787		28.2%
1970	2,344		31.2%
1980	2,832		20.8%
1990	2,947		4.1%
2000	3,385		14.9%
2010	4,142		22.4%
2020	4,150		0.2%
U.S. Decennial Census

=== Racial and ethnic composition ===
Peotone village, Illinois – Racial and ethnic composition Note: the US Census treats Hispanic/Latino as an ethnic category. This table excludes Latinos from the racial categories and assigns them to a separate category. Hispanics/Latinos may be of any race.
Race / Ethnicity (NH = Non-Hispanic)	Pop 2000	Pop 2010	Pop 2020	% 2000	% 2010	% 2020
White alone (NH)	3,285	3,846	3,672	97.05%	92.85%	88.48%
Black or African American alone (NH)	9	32	40	0.27%	0.77%	0.96%
Native American or Alaska Native alone (NH)	2	4	0	0.06%	0.10%	0.00%
Asian alone (NH)	15	12	21	0.44%	0.29%	0.51%
Native Hawaiian or Pacific Islander alone (NH)	0	0	0	0.00%	0.00%	0.00%
Other race alone (NH)	0	1	7	0.00%	0.02%	0.17%
Mixed race or Multiracial (NH)	28	38	145	0.83%	0.92%	3.49%
Hispanic or Latino (any race)	46	209	265	1.36%	5.05%	6.39%
Total	3,385	4,142	4,150	100.00%	100.00%	100.00%

=== 2020 census ===
As of the 2020 census, Peotone had a population of 4,150. The median age was 40.0 years. 21.9% of residents were under the age of 18 and 15.3% were 65 years of age or older. For every 100 females, there were 100.0 males; for every 100 females age 18 and over, there were 97.8 males age 18 and over.

0.0% of residents lived in urban areas, while 100.0% lived in rural areas.

There were 1,643 households in Peotone, of which 32.0% had children under the age of 18 living in them. Of all households, 52.2% were married-couple households, 16.6% were households with a male householder and no spouse or partner present, and 23.9% were households with a female householder and no spouse or partner present. About 26.2% of all households were made up of individuals and 9.8% had someone living alone who was 65 years of age or older.

There were 1,722 housing units, of which 4.6% were vacant. The homeowner vacancy rate was 1.8% and the rental vacancy rate was 4.5%.

=== 2000 census ===
As of the census of 2000, there were 3,385 people, 1,268 households, and 930 families residing in the village. The population density was 2,232.4 inhabitants per square mile (861.9/km^{2}). There were 1,299 housing units at an average density of 856.7 per square mile (330.8/km^{2}). The racial makeup of the village was 97.93% White, 0.27% African American, 0.06% Native American, 0.47% Asian, 0.30% from other races, and 0.97% from two or more races. Hispanic or Latino of any race were 1.36% of the population.

There were 1,250 households, out of which 37.3% had children under the age of 18 living with them, 60.1% were married couples living together, 10.1% had a female householder with no husband present, and 26.6% were non-families. 22.4% of all households were made up of individuals, and 9.2% had someone living alone who was 65 years of age or older. The average household size was 2.67 and the average family size was 3.17.

In the village, the population was spread out, with 27.9% under the age of 18, 8.0% from 18 to 24, 29.3% from 25 to 44, 23.2% from 45 to 64, and 11.6% who were 65 years of age or older. The median age was 37 years. For every 100 females, there were 93.1 males. For every 100 females age 18 and over, there were 89.7 males.

The median income for a household in the village was $56,404, and the median income for a family was $61,768. Males had a median income of $47,500 versus $26,636 for females. The per capita income for the village was $23,415. About 0.7% of families and 0.8% of the population were below the poverty line, including 0.9% of those under age 18 and 3.5% of those age 65 or over.

== Education ==
All of Peotone is in the Peotone Community Unit School District 207U.

Peotone Elementary School (PES), located in town Peotone, serves kindergarten through 3rd grade. Peotone Intermediate Center (PIC), formerly Green Garden Elementary School in Green Garden Township, serves 4th and 5th grades. The Connor Shaw Center is home to the district offices and the Pre-K Center.

Peotone Junior High School serves grades six through eight, and has been located in the former Peotone Junior Senior High School building since the 2001–2002 school year; the high school continues to use some of the outdoor sports facilities at the junior high. Several referendums have been orchestrated to build a new sports complex at the new high school, but have failed; these have also included plans to build on to the existing high school and junior high in order to resolve overcrowding.

In 2001, a new high school was built on the northwest side of Peotone. It's named Peotone High School While the school was designed for a capacity of 600 students, its student enrollment for the 2010-2011 fiscal year was approximately 687. The school mascot of all schools, from elementary through high school, is the Blue Devil.

As of 2007, Peotone schools had a total enrollment of 2,107 students in kindergarten through 12th grade.

In 2014, the Peotone School Board, in a 4–3 vote, decided to close the Wilton Center Elementary School in Wilton Township. The remaining elementary schools were reformatted to grade centers.

== Proposed south suburban airport ==
Peotone has long been the proposed site of a new airport to serve the Chicago area. As is often the case with the construction of airports, the proposal is controversial. In 1967, the Chicago Tribune ran several editorials regarding the need for a third airport in Peotone.

Proponents point out that the existing facilities at O'Hare and Midway airports cannot meet the transportation needs of the Chicago area, and that the development will bring economic prosperity to Chicago Southland, an area deprived of economic development, as well as the rest of the state. Politicians backing plans include former Governor Rod Blagojevich; former Representative Jesse Jackson Jr., Congressman Jerry Weller, the former representative of the district in which the airport would be located, and Will County Executive Larry Walsh. The efforts were also supported by then-state senator Barack Obama.

Opponents to the plan are concerned about the environmental disruption that would be caused by new airport construction and the roads that would be needed to support it. They also point out that Gary/Chicago International Airport in Gary, Indiana already exists, is closer to Chicago than Peotone, and is already undergoing expansion to support heavier use with minimal environmental impact. Politicians opposing the Peotone airport plan include former Chicago Mayor Richard M. Daley, former Gary Mayor Scott King, Indiana Governor Mitch Daniels, and Representative Pete Visclosky from Indiana.

Former Representative Jesse Jackson Jr. was the head of a private group in Cook County looking to take ownership of the proposed airport. A state-backed IDOT plan is more friendly to the citizens of the actual footprint of the proposed airport by giving local control of the airport to Will County officials instead.

In the science-fiction novel The Boy Who Would Live Forever (2004), which was the fifth in the Gateway series, Frederik Pohl has a character fly out of "Peotone International Airport". The late Pohl lived in Palatine, Illinois.
