= Jason Gooding =

Trinidad and Tobago triathlete

Personal information
- Nickname: Catfish
- Born: March 2, 1979 (age 47) Trinidad
- Height: 1.77 m (5 ft 10 in)
- Weight: 70 kg (154 lb)

Sport
- Country: Trinidad and Tobago
Medal record
Triathlon
Representing Trinidad and Tobago
Trinidad and Tobago Triathlon National Championships
| Gold medal – first place | 1994 National | Men's Open |
| Gold medal – first place | 1995 National | Men's Open |
| Gold medal – first place | 1996 National | Men's Open |
| Gold medal – first place | 1997 National | Men's Open |
| Gold medal – first place | 1998 National | Men's Open |
| Gold medal – first place | 1999 National | Men's Open |
| Gold medal – first place | 2000 National | Men's Open |
| Gold medal – first place | 2001 National | Men's Open |
| Gold medal – first place | 2002 National | Men's Open |

Jason Gooding (born March 2, 1979) is a Triathlete from Trinidad and Tobago. He is a nine-time national champion.

== Competition highlights ==
- Elite Male Winner of the Maple Lodge Farms Triathlon Series 2003
- Represented Trinidad and Tobago at 6 World Triathlon Championships
- Competed at 6 International Triathlon Union ITU World Cup races
- Competed at the 2002 Commonwealth Games in Manchester, England
- 9 X Trinidad and Tobago National Triathlon Champion
- Competition wins in Grenada, Barbados, Nevis, Puerto Rico, Canada, United States
