= Homer Community Consolidated School District 33C =

School district in Illinois, United States

Homer Community Consolidated School District 33C is an Illinois school district that serves the communities of Homer Glen and Lockport, both in Will County. Students in grades K-8 attend schools in Homer School District 33C. The district's schools are named after past superintendents or former schoolhouses. In the 2023-2024 school year, the district had 3,675 students enrolled across 6 schools.

Students who attend schools in District 33C go to Lockport Township High School in District 205.

== History ==
In 1956, six one room schoolhouses in the area (Lauffer, Hadley, Ross, Wells Corner, Goodings Grove and Barnett schools) were consolidated into one school for the community. The first year of enrollment was 80 students.

The first full-time superintendent, William Tweedy served the district from 1964 to 1965. His successor, Luther J. Schilling (for whom Schilling School is named) guided the district for 20 years. When he retired in 1986, the school district had grown to 2,308 students.

== Schools ==
District 33C is made up of 6 schools:

1. Luther J. Schilling School (K-4), est. 1956
2. Goodings Grove School (K-4), est. 1979
3. Homer Junior High School (7-8), est. 1981
4. Hadley Middle School (5-6), est. 1988
5. William J. Butler School (2-4), est. 2001
6. William E. Young School (K-4), est. 2010
