= Louis Joliet Hotel =

- U.S. National Register of Historic Places
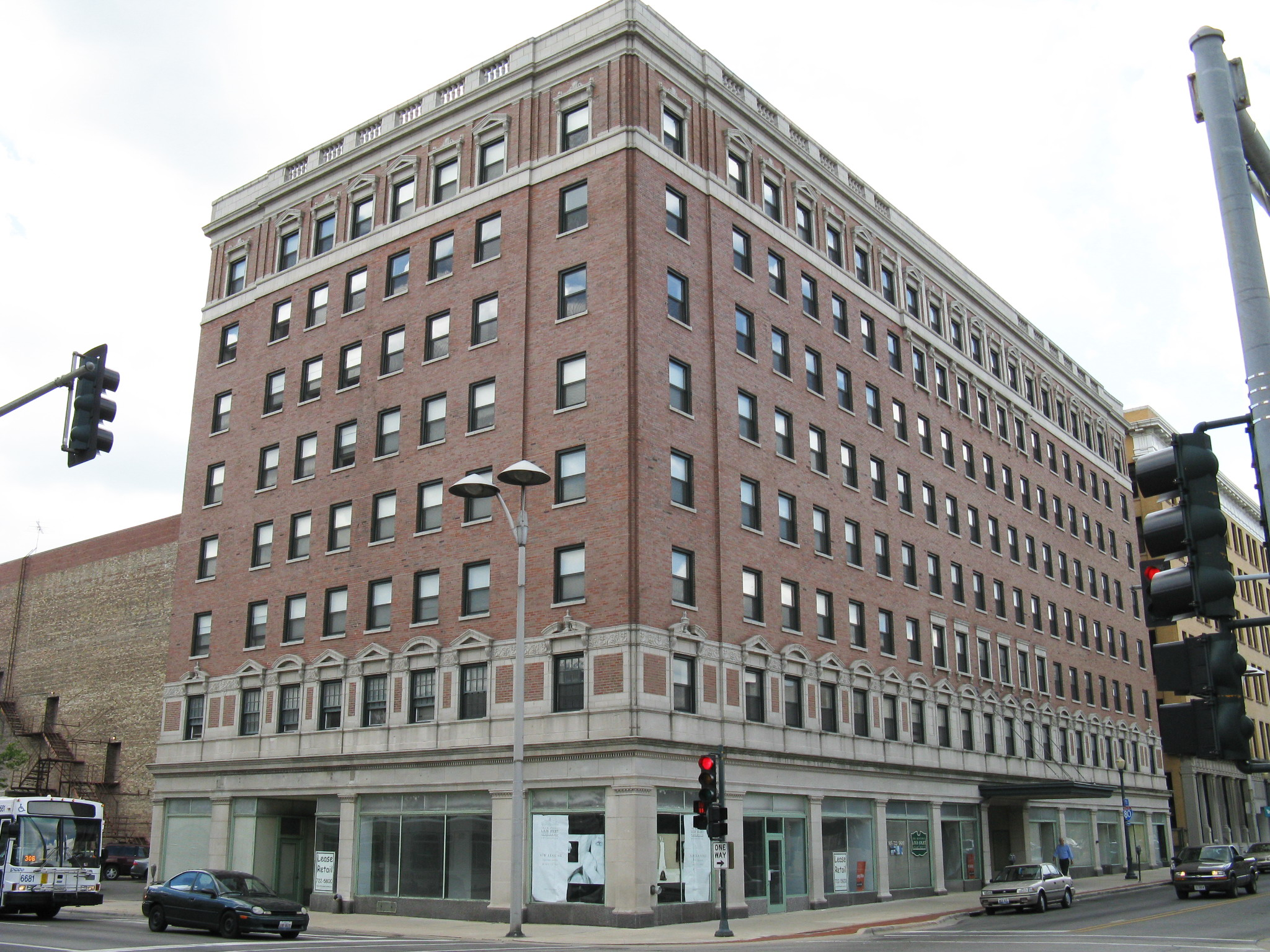

- Location within Illinois Location within the United States
- Location: 22 East Clinton Street; Joliet, Will County, Illinois, United States
- Coordinates: 41°31′32″N 88°4′30″W
- Built: 1927
- Architect: Noyes Roach
- Architectural style: Classical Revival
- NRHP reference No.: 90000101
- Added to NRHP: February 9, 1990

The Louis Joliet Hotel is a historic, eight-story building in Joliet, Illinois.

== History ==
The Classical Revival building was constructed in 1927 and initially functioned as a hotel. The Louis Joliet was one of many hotels to set up in downtown Joliet in response to increased automobile usage. The ensuing economical surge resulted in a substantial increase in the number of business travelers, and hence, an increased demand for hotel rooms. Whereas previous hotels needed to be close to either the Illinois and Michigan Canal or a train station, new hotels could set up anywhere in town. New hotels were architecturally ornate and featured dinner rooms and ballrooms. These features were intended to draw in travelers and make the hotel seem ideal for conducting business.

The Ruben Brothers were prominent developers who envisioned a new hotel near the site where they planned on building a theater. They aimed to construct an entire city block that served business and entertainment needs. The Rialto Square Theatre was constructed in 1926, but they struggled to secure financing for a hotel. Real estate developer Fred J. Walsh shared the Rubens' interest in developing a hotel on the site and was able to issue stock to finance the project. At eight stories, the Joliet Hotel was among the largest buildings in downtown Joliet upon its completion in 1927. The 225-room building cost approximately $750,000, including over $135,000 on furniture. The first floor of the hotel featured stores selling coffee, cigars, and newspapers, as well as a barber shop and reading room. The outside of the building also featured eleven shops. The hotel also owned a parking garage and offered valet services to hotel guests.

By the 1950s, the demand for urban hotels was on the decline as they struggled to compete with smaller, cheaper motels along the highway. In 1964, the hotel was sold to the Active Order of Carmelites and was converted to a nursing home. In 1980, the hotel was remodeled and used as a performing arts center. It was added to the National Register of Historic Places in 1990 and was later converted into an apartment building.
