= Downtown Peotone Historic District =

Historic district in Illinois, United States

- U.S. National Register of Historic Places
- U.S. Historic district
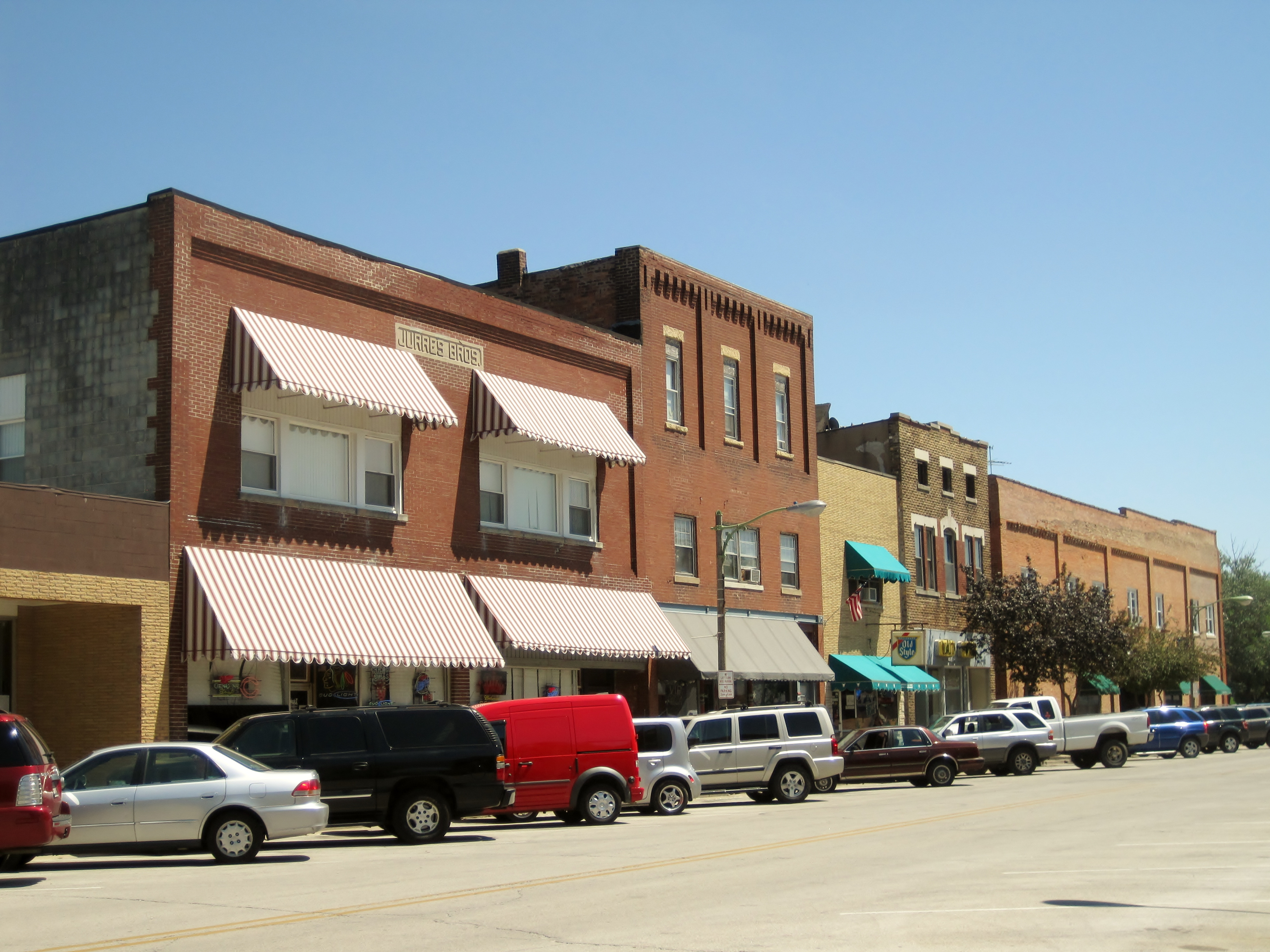

- Location within Illinois Location within the United States
- Location: Roughly North First Street and both sides of North Second Street, roughly bounded by the alley south of Main and north by North Street; Peotone, Will County, Illinois, U.S.
- Coordinates: 41°20′3″N 87°47′29″W
- Architectural style: Late 19th and Early 20th Century Movements, Queen Anne
- NRHP reference No.: 05001253
- Added to NRHP: November 16, 2005

The Downtown Peotone Historic District is a set of forty-two buildings in Peotone, Illinois. Of these, thirty-seven contribute to the historical integrity of the area.

== History ==
The Illinois Central Railroad was constructed in 1856 and provided rail service for eastern Will County. Two years later, the first commercial structure opened in the city, and residents flocked to the area. By 1865, a windmill, post office, an opera house, a trolley system, and several grain elevators had opened in the city. Peotone also housed the Will County Fair during this period.

The land east of Peotone was fertile, resulting in a large population of both farmers and merchants. Most business was conducted on Railroad Street, with storefronts facing the railroad tracks. Eventually business moved to Second Street, causing many of the Railroad Street businesses to simply install new storefronts on what was the rear of their building. An electric generation plant was opened in Peotone in 1894, and street lighting was added later that year. A water tower was erected in 1895, and sidewalks were laid in 1902. A portion of the district on Main Street was destroyed in a 1913 fire and rebuilt a year later. The village trolleys carried passengers from 63rd & Halsted in Chicago south to Kankakee. A major employer in the 1920s was the Continental Bridge Company, which produced many bridges in the United States and Canada, and also supplied steel for the United States Shipping Board. Development ceased in the 1930s following the Great Depression and never recovered.

The first buildings in the town were mostly vernacular structures of framing. Following devastation by fire, focus on building materials shifted to masonry. All but two of the buildings in the historic district were, at some point, used for commercial purposes. The Downtown Peotone Historic District was added to the National Register of Historic Places on November 16, 2005.
