= David Willoughby Gooding =

British professor of Greek (1925–2019)

- Born: September 16, 1925
- Died: August 30, 2019 (aged 93)
- Title: Professor Emeritus of Old Testament Greek
- Board member of: Royal Irish Academy

Academic background
- Education: University of Cambridge
- Thesis: The Greek Deuteronomy (1954)
- Website: https://www.myrtlefieldhouse.com/en/david-gooding

David Willoughby Gooding (16 September 1925 Ipswich – England 30 August 2019) was a British lecturer, author, and professor of Greek at Queen's University, Belfast.

Born in Ipswich, England, Gooding was the youngest of six children: four brothers and two sisters. His mother died when he was nine, and as a young man he helped with the care of his father.

After the Second World War, Gooding studied Classics at Trinity College, Cambridge (1947–54). He was then appointed to a Post–Doctoral Research Fellowship, studying ancient manuscripts at Durham University from 1954–59.

From 1959–79, Gooding was a lecturer and then reader in Classics at Queen's University, Belfast. He was appointed professor of Old Testament Greek in 1979, and professor of Greek in 1983. He retired in 1986, becoming professor emeritus. He was elected as a member of the Royal Irish Academy in 1977.

As well as academic monographs and articles relating to the Septuagint, Gooding published many Bible commentaries, apologetic works, and a manual on the New Testament's use of the Old. His books have been translated into over twenty–five languages. In 1989 Gooding and John Lennox began working on books and articles to be published in Russia and Ukraine.

During his time in Northern Ireland, David was an active member of a Gospel Assembly in Belfast, meeting in Apsley Hall. He travelled widely, giving Bible talks and lectures on a wide variety of books and topics. .

== Works ==
=== Thesis ===
- Gooding, David W. (1954). The Greek Deuteronomy (Ph.D.). University of Cambridge.

=== Books ===
Gooding's books include:

- Gooding, David W. (1955). Recensions of the Septuagint Pentateuch. Cambridge: Tyndale Press.
- ——— (1987). According to Luke. Leicester: Inter-Varsity Press. ISBN 978-0-85110-756-1.
- ——— (1989). An Unshakeable Kingdom. Gospel Folio Press. ISBN 978-1882701797.
- ——— (1995). True to the Faith. Gospel Folio Press. ISBN 978-1-882701-20-9.
- ———; Lennox, John (1997). Christianity Opium or Truth?. Gospel Folio Press. ISBN 978-1882701469.
- ——— (2001). In the School of Christ. Gospel Folio Press. ISBN 978-1882701193.
- ———; Lennox, John (2001). Key Bible Concepts. Gospel Folio Press. ISBN 978-1882701414.
- ———; Lennox, John (2001). The Definition of Christianity. Gospel Folio Press. ISBN 978-1882701421.
- ——— (2013). The Riches of Divine Wisdom: The New Testament's Use of the Old Testament. Myrtlefield House. ISBN 978-1874584216.
- ———; Lennox, John C. (2018). Being Truly Human: The Limits of Our Worth, Power, Freedom and Destiny. The Quest for Reality and Significance. Vol. 1. Belfast: Myrtlefield House. ISBN 978-1912721016.
- ———; Lennox, John C. (2018). Finding Ultimate Reality: In Search of the Best Answers to the Biggest Questions. The Quest for Reality and Significance. Vol. 2. Belfast: Myrtlefield House. ISBN 978-1912721061.
- ———; Lennox, John C. (2019). Questioning Our Knowledge: Can We Know What We Need to Know?. The Quest for Reality and Significance. Vol. 3. Belfast: Myrtlefield House. ISBN 978-1912721115.
- ———; Lennox, John C. (2019). Doing What's Right: The Limits of Our Worth, Power, Freedom and Destiny. The Quest for Reality and Significance. Vol. 4. Belfast: Myrtlefield House. ISBN 978-1912721214.
- ———; Lennox, John C. (2019). Claiming to Answer: How One Person Became the Response to Our Deepest Questions. The Quest for Reality and Significance. Vol. 5. Belfast: Myrtlefield House. ISBN 978-1912721269.
- ———; Lennox, John C. (2019). Suffering Life's Pain: Facing the Problems of Moral and Natural Evil. The Quest for Reality and Significance. Vol. 6. Belfast: Myrtlefield House. ISBN 978-1912721160.
- ——— (2024). The Letters of David W. Gooding: Answering Questions Related to the Christian Faith. Myrtlefield House. ISBN 978-1912721931.

== See also ==
- John Lennox
