= Peotone Mill =

- U.S. National Register of Historic Places
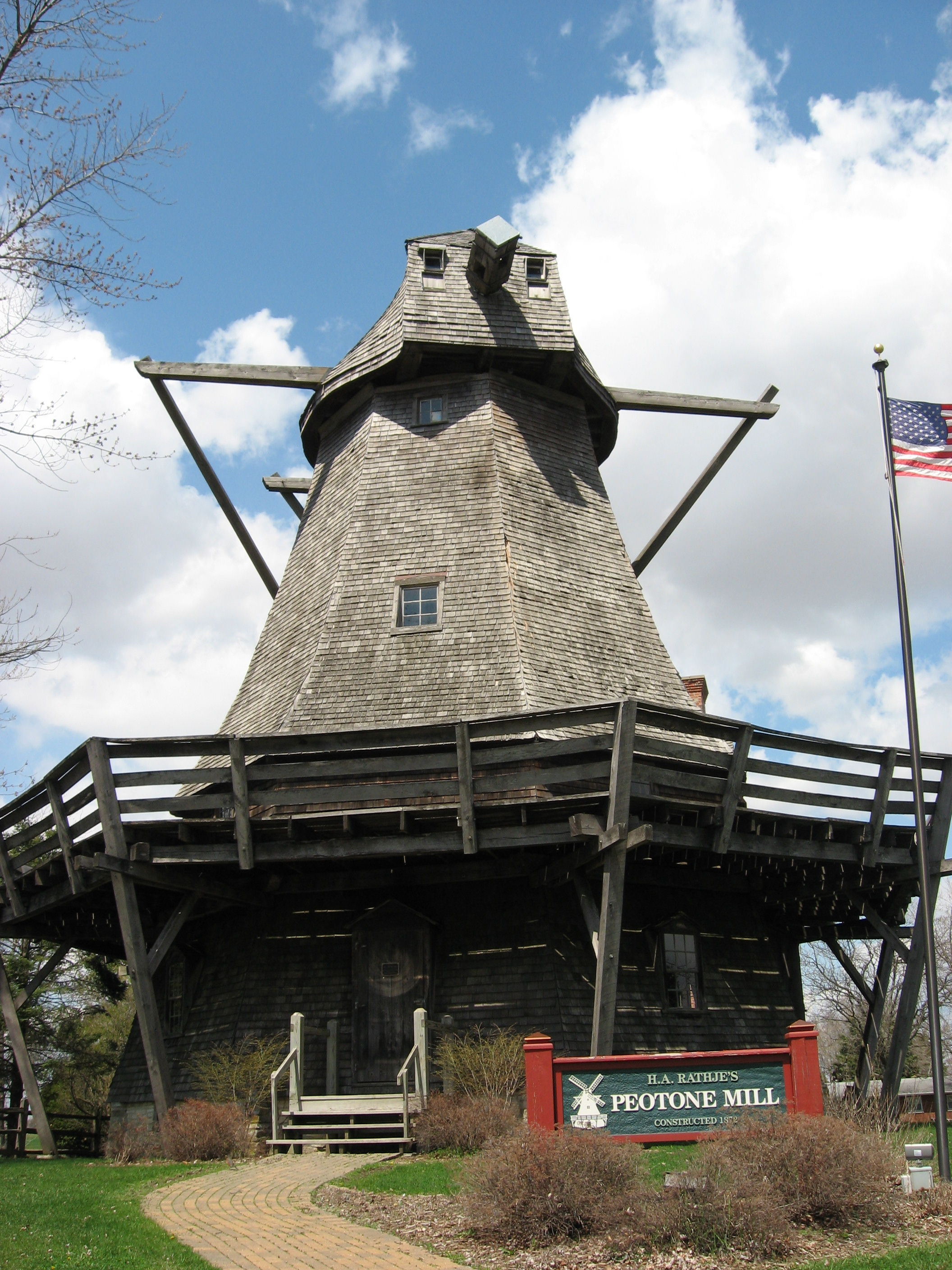
- The Rathje Mill, or Peotone Mill, is an example of a late 19th-century wind powered grist mill,

- Location within Illinois
- Location: 433 W. Corning Ave., Peotone, Illinois
- Coordinates: 41°19′55″N 87°47′49″W
- Area: less than one acre
- Built: 1872
- NRHP reference No.: 82002605
- Added to NRHP: March 19, 1982

The Peotone Mill, formerly known as the Rathje Mill, is located in the village of Peotone, Illinois, which is in Will County, Illinois, United States. The mill was donated to the Village of Peotone in the early 1980s. The building is listed on the National Register of Historic Places as well as the Will County Register of Historic Places.

== History ==
Henry A. Rathje is credited with building the windmill, but it was his father, Frederick Rathje, with Christoph Elling, who agreed to build the mill. The warranty deed from July 3, 1871 confirms this. An account of the Rathje family was contained in the 1900 Genealogical and Biographical Record of Will County. According to it, Rathje (Henry) married Wilhelmina Luhmann in 1874, Luhmann was an immigrant from Hanover, Germany. After marrying, Rathje entered the milling business during which time he acquired the windmill at Peotone and operated it for twelve years. Henry Rathje is listed as the proprietor on a mill invoice.

The structure was designed by Dutch millwrights. The design, which included the mill's 60 foot tower, makes it the only "skyscraper" in Peotone. The mill's integrity has, for the most part, been maintained throughout its existence and it is a familiar visual landmark in Peotone and Will County.

== Mill operation ==
The windmill at Peotone provided a variety of grain products. Fine wheat, rye and buckwheat flours, as well as cornmeal were common products the grist mill offered. The local livestock industry depended upon the mill as its primary source for feed. Thus, the mill's busiest time of year was during the autumn when livestock farmers would stock up for the winter with the mill's freshly ground grain products. The mill's surplus product was stored in a building that was once attached to west side of the windmill. Income for Rathje came from a "toll" which the mill charged. The toll was essentially a fraction of the finished product, these tolls were governed by state laws. In 1885 the wind powered grist mill was switched over to steam power. Tales handed down through the Rathje family speak of the windmill's sails rotting and cite this as the reason for the change over to steam power.

The exact date the mill ceased operation can not be projected with any great accuracy. It is suspected that the mill ended operations sometime around 1889. It is known, however, from the Genealogical Record of 1900 that by that date the mill had been rendered unprofitable by modern mill methods and Rathje had abandoned it. The mill, however, continued to operate in some capacity until World War I when it finally closed entirely in 1917.

== Preservation ==
For nearly 100 years the windmill in Peotone stood silent and empty. Rathje's son, Paul W. Rathje, performed routine maintenance on the mill during this time. Paul had two children, Paul and Helen, and the mill was eventually passed on to Paul C. Rathje, the grandson of Henry. He realized the historic importance of the mill structure and donated it to the Village of Peotone in 1982. That same year, the mill was listed on the National Register of Historic Places. The Peotone Historical Society undertook the task of restoring the mill to its original, working condition. They have divided the project into several phases and continue maintenance and restoration. In 2004 the Landmarks Preservation Council of Illinois did grant the Peotone Historical Society $5,000 to conduct a structural assessment of the mill.
