= Will County School District 92 =

School district in Illinois, United States

Address
- 708 N State Street Lockport, Illinois, 60441; United States

District information
- Type: Public
- Grades: PreK–8
- NCES District ID: 1723730

Students and staff
- Students: 1,410 (2020–2021)

Other information
- Website: www.d92.org

Will County School District 92 is a public grade school district which serves grades K-8. It mainly serves the communities of Lockport, Illinois and Homer Glen, Illinois. It contains four buildings: Walsh (Pre K, K-1st), Reed (2nd-3rd), Ludwig (4th-5th), and Oak Prairie (6th-8th) with the administration building adjacent to Ludwig. Ludwig is the oldest school, and Oak Prairie is the newest. All of the D92 schools have high ratings. Students at Walsh, Reed and Ludwig stay in one classroom, but goes to another classroom for activities such as gym, art, media center, or music. Students at Oak Prairie go to a different class for each subject on a schedule to prepare for high school.
