= Small–Towle House =

Historic house in Illinois, United States

- U.S. National Register of Historic Places
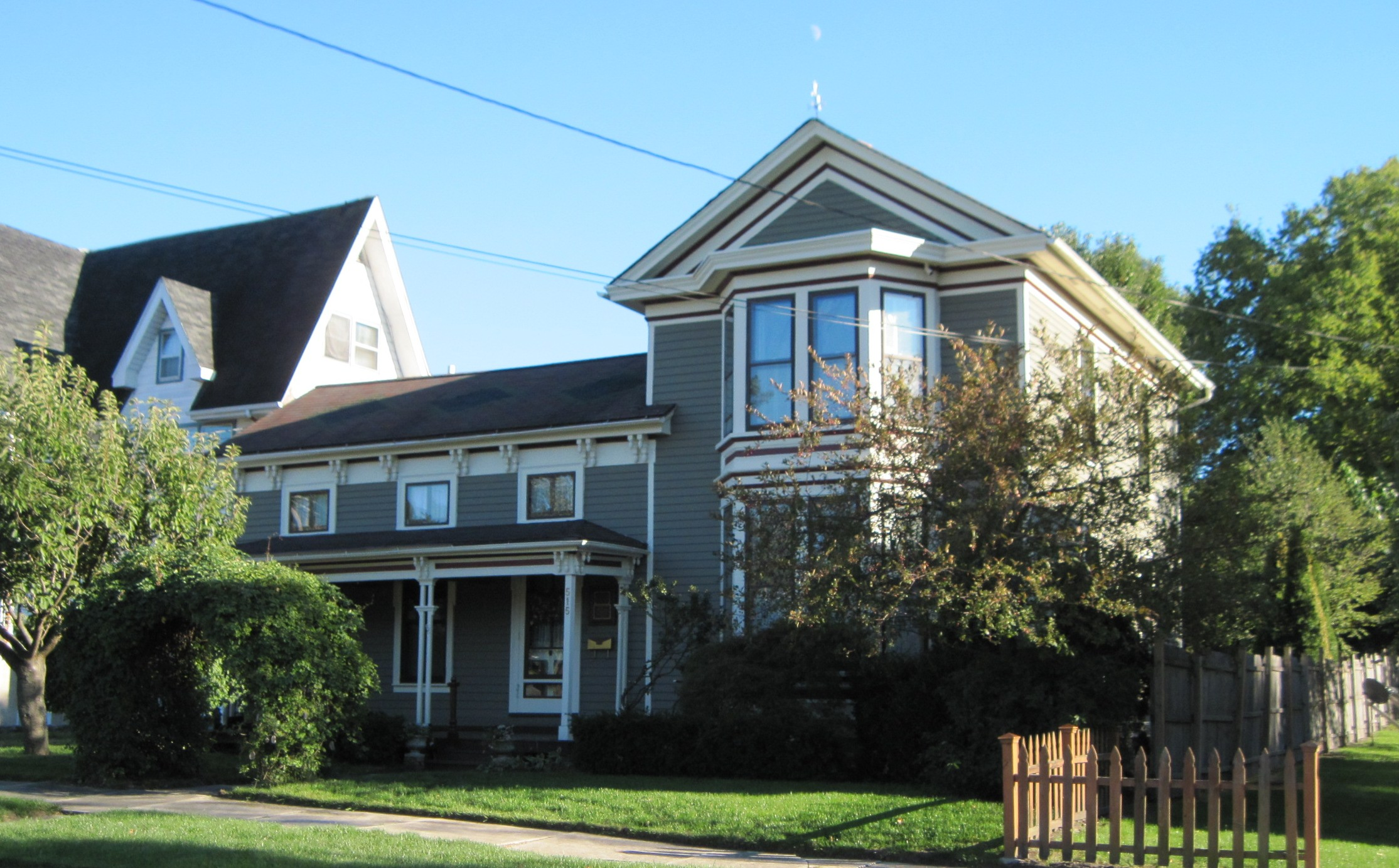

- Location within Illinois Location within the United States
- Location: 515 County Road; Wilmington, Will County, Illinois, U.S.
- Coordinates: 41°18′39″N 88°8′31″W
- Built: 1864
- NRHP reference No.: 04000419
- Added to NRHP: May 12, 2004

The Small–Towle House is a historic residence in Wilmington, Illinois. Wilmington was an important milling down in the 1850s, particularly with the connection of the Chicago and Alton Railroad in 1854. The house was built by William McGinnis in 1864. After five years, he sold the house for more than ten times the price he paid for the lot. One of the early owners of the house was John H. Daniels, Wilmington's first mayor. In 1870, the Small family purchased the home; the son of the owner married the daughter of McGinnis later that year. Eli Small ran the Mohawk Belle, a steamboat on the Illinois and Michigan Canal. The Smalls lived in the house until 1883, when they sold it to the Towle family. The Towles sold the house in 1933 for $1 during the Great Depression under the condition that the owners cared for Julia Towle. Constructed during the transition time between Greek Revival and Italianate styles, the vernacular building is often classified as "upright-and-wing". The house was listed on the National Register of Historic Places on December 17, 1979.
