= Goodings Grove, Illinois =

Goodings Grove
- Neighborhood of Homer Glen, Illinois former census designated place
- Location of Goodings Grove within Illinois
- Coordinates: 41°37′34″N 87°56′26″W
- Country: United States
- State: Illinois
- County: Will

Area
  - Total: 9.4 sq mi (24 km^{2})
- Elevation: 758 ft (231 m)

Population (2000)
  - Total: 17,084
  - Density: 1,800/sq mi (700/km^{2})
- Time zone: UTC-6 (CST)
  - Summer (DST): UTC-5 (CDT)
- Area codes: 815, 779

Goodings Grove was a census-designated place (CDP) in northern Will County, Illinois, United States. The population was 17,084 at the 2000 census. It is now a neighborhood of the village of Homer Glen, Illinois, which was incorporated in 2001.

== Geography ==
Goodings Grove was located at 41°37′34″N 87°56′26″W (41.626164, −87.940460).

According to the United States Census Bureau, the CDP had a total area of 9.4 square miles (24 km^{2}), of which 0.11% is water.

== Demographics ==
As of the census of 2000, there were 17,084 people, 5,109 households, and 4,649 families residing in the CDP. The population density was 1,813.6 inhabitants per square mile (700.2/km^{2}). There were 5,183 housing units at an average density of 550.2 per square mile (212.4/km^{2}). The racial makeup of the CDP was 96.49% White, 0.20% African American, 0.01% Native American, 1.74% Asian, 0.59% from other races, and 0.97% from two or more races. Hispanic or Latino of any race were 3.52% of the population.

There were 5,109 households, out of which 49.6% had children under the age of 18 living with them, 84.1% were married couples living together, 4.9% had a female householder with no husband present, and 9.0% were non-families. 7.3% of all households were made up of individuals, and 2.8% had someone living alone who was 65 years of age or older. The average household size was 3.34 and the average family size was 3.53.

In the CDP, the population was spread out, with 31.1% under the age of 18, 7.8% from 18 to 24, 28.2% from 25 to 44, 27.3% from 45 to 64, and 5.8% who were 65 years of age or older. The median age was 36 years. For every 100 females, there were 100.4 males. For every 100 females age 18 and over, there were 96.9 males.

The median income for a household in the CDP was $84,484, and the median income for a family was $88,101. Males had a median income of $57,017 versus $34,583 for females. The per capita income for the CDP was $29,452. About 1.5% of families and 1.8% of the population were below the poverty line, including 3.1% of those under age 18 and 1.2% of those age 65 or over.
