= Lockport, Illinois =

Lockport
- City
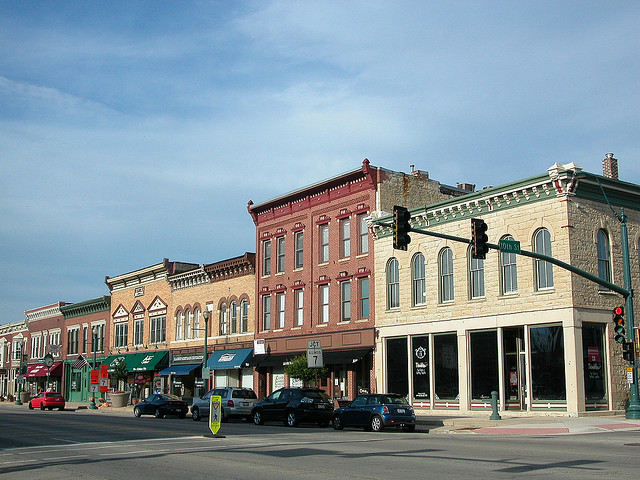
- A portion of downtown Lockport, 2010

- Flag Seal

- Location of Lockport in Will County, Illinois.

- Location of Illinois in the United States
- Coordinates: 41°35′25″N 88°01′45″W
- Country: United States
- State: Illinois
- County: Will
- Townships: Lockport, Homer
- Founded: 1853

Area
  - Total: 11.59 sq mi (30.01 km^{2})
  - Land: 11.54 sq mi (29.90 km^{2})
  - Water: 0.039 sq mi (0.10 km^{2})
- Elevation: 696 ft (212 m)

Population (2020)
  - Total: 26,094
  - Density: 2,260.1/sq mi (872.62/km^{2})
- Time zone: UTC−6 (CST)
  - Summer (DST): UTC−5 (CDT)
- ZIP Code: 60441
- Area codes: 815 and 779
- FIPS code: 17-44225
- GNIS feature ID: 2395740
- Wikimedia Commons: Lockport, Illinois
- Website: www.cityoflockport.net

Lockport is a city in Will County, Illinois, United States, located 30 miles southwest of Chicago. Lockport Borders Lemont, Romeoville, New Lenox, Joliet, And Homer Glen. Per the 2020 census, the population was 26,094. The city was incorporated in 1853. It is situated along the Illinois and Michigan (I&M) Canal, and was the headquarters of the canal when the canal was operating. A section of the canal runs through Lockport, including the remains of the canal's Lock No. 1 from which the town received its name. The canal right-of-way is now the Illinois and Michigan National Heritage Corridor.

== Geography ==
Lockport is located on the east bank of the Des Plaines River just north of Joliet. The village of Lemont is about two miles to the north along the river.

== Demographics ==
Historical population
Census	Pop.	Note	%±
1870	1,772		—
1880	1,679		−5.2%
1890	2,449		45.9%
1900	2,659		8.6%
1910	2,555		−3.9%
1920	2,684		5.0%
1930	3,383		26.0%
1940	3,475		2.7%
1950	4,955		42.6%
1960	7,560		52.6%
1970	9,861		30.4%
1980	9,192		−6.8%
1990	9,401		2.3%
2000	15,191		61.6%
2010	24,839		63.5%
2020	26,094		5.1%
U.S. Decennial Census; 2010 2020

=== Racial and ethnic composition ===
Lockport city, Illinois – Racial and ethnic composition Note: the US Census treats Hispanic/Latino as an ethnic category. This table excludes Latinos from the racial categories and assigns them to a separate category. Hispanics/Latinos may be of any race.
Race / Ethnicity (NH = Non-Hispanic)	Pop 2000	Pop 2010	Pop 2020	% 2000	% 2010	% 2020
White alone (NH)	14,080	21,854	21,818	92.69%	87.98%	83.61%
Black or African American alone (NH)	164	329	395	1.08%	1.32%	1.51%
Native American or Alaska Native alone (NH)	33	31	12	0.22%	0.12%	0.05%
Asian alone (NH)	114	329	455	0.75%	1.32%	1.74%
Native Hawaiian or Pacific Islander alone (NH)	1	6	1	0.01%	0.02%	0.00%
Other race alone (NH)	7	17	57	0.05%	0.07%	0.22%
Mixed race or Multiracial (NH)	132	248	797	0.87%	1.00%	3.05%
Hispanic or Latino (any race)	660	2,025	2,559	4.34%	8.15%	9.81%
Total	15,191	24,839	26,094	100.00%	100.00%	100.00%

=== 2020 census ===
As of the 2020 census, Lockport had a population of 26,094. The median age was 38.2 years. 25.3% of residents were under the age of 18 and 12.2% of residents were 65 years of age or older. For every 100 females there were 96.8 males, and for every 100 females age 18 and over there were 94.3 males age 18 and over.

99.1% of residents lived in urban areas, while 0.9% lived in rural areas.

There were 9,633 households in Lockport, of which 37.5% had children under the age of 18 living in them. Of all households, 57.3% were married-couple households, 14.4% were households with a male householder and no spouse or partner present, and 22.6% were households with a female householder and no spouse or partner present. About 23.0% of all households were made up of individuals and 9.0% had someone living alone who was 65 years of age or older.

There were 10,058 housing units, of which 4.2% were vacant. The homeowner vacancy rate was 1.1% and the rental vacancy rate was 10.7%.

Racial composition as of the 2020 census
Race	Number	Percent
White	22,546	86.4%
Black or African American	419	1.6%
American Indian and Alaska Native	68	0.3%
Asian	462	1.8%
Native Hawaiian and Other Pacific Islander	1	0.0%
Some other race	642	2.5%
Two or more races	1,956	7.5%
Hispanic or Latino (of any race)	2,559	9.8%

=== 2000 census ===
Although the population was 15,191 at the 2000 census, a special census of 2003 counted 25,191 people, 13,599 households, and 12,137 families residing in the city. The population density was 2,144.3 inhabitants per square mile (827.9/km^{2}). There were 5,835 housing units at an average density of 823.7 per square mile (318.0/km^{2}). The racial makeup of the city was 95.82% White, 1.11% African American, 0.22% Native American, 0.75% Asian, 0.01% Pacific Islander, 0.94% from other races, and 1.15% from two or more races. Hispanic or Latino people of any race were 4.34% of the population.

There were 8,599 households, out of which 38.5% had children under the age of 18 living with them, 60.9% were married couples living together, 9.7% had a female householder with no husband present, and 26.1% were non-families. 20.8% of all households were made up of individuals, and 6.9% had someone living alone who was 65 years of age or older. The average household size was 2.71 and the average family size was 3.17.

In the city, the population was spread out, with 28.2% under the age of 18, 7.7% from 18 to 24, 36.1% from 25 to 44, 18.0% from 45 to 64, and 10.1% who were 65 years of age or older. The median age was 33 years. For every 100 females, there were 96.8 males. For every 100 females age 18 and over, there were 94.1 males. The median income for a household in the city was $72,231, and the median income for a family was $81,717. Males had a median income of $65,759 versus $42,551 for females. The per capita income for the city was $32,939. About 3.2% of families and 3.5% of the population were below the poverty line, including 4.3% of those under age 18 and 1.2% of those age 65 or over.

== Parks and recreation ==
The City of Lockport, Illinois, has a park district titled the Lockport Township Park District that was created in 1945. It manages and maintains 38 parks and several recreational programs with the goal to "enrich the quality of life of the community". According to the city's website, each park should provide at least one of the following recreational activities: A place to engage in sports, open spaces in which children may play in, pavilions for picnics or gatherings, playgrounds, and other facilities.

Dellwood Park is also home to the "Hayride of Horror" and "Curse of the Bayou.'' These haunted attractions are open in October and feature spooky scenes that aim to scare guests. The haunts are family friendly and are welcoming to members of the community. They offer community service hours for acting in the haunt. The attractions are put together by community member, Andrea Vaughn, and her team of managers. They work all through the spring and summer planning new scenes, designing sets, and recruiting actors.

=== Museums and historic sites ===
Downtown Lockport contains four museums, all within walking distance of one another, as well as other historic places.

Gaylord Building.

The Gaylord Building is a historic site of the National Trust for Historic Preservation. It was constructed in 1838 of local limestone for use as a warehouse and is situated on the east side of the Illinois & Michigan Canal, just north of downtown Lockport. Renovated in the 1980s, the building now houses a restaurant and has historical galleries.

Illinois and Michigan Canal Museum

Located in the original 1837 Canal headquarters building, the Illinois and Michigan Canal Museum offers 10 rooms filled with artifacts, pictures and documents relating to the construction and operation of the Canal, as well as period items specific to the region during the height of the Canal's operation.

The Lockport Gallery

The Lockport Gallery celebrates Illinois through changing exhibits featuring paintings, drawings, sculptures, quilts and other media created by the state's artists and artisans. These rotating, theme-based exhibits are supplemented and showcased through educational events, group tours and outreach programs for all ages. An Illinois State Museum (ISM) facility, the Lockport Gallery is located in a structure that is itself a work of art and history. The historic Norton Building was constructed on the banks of the Illinois and Michigan Canal in 1850 to serve as a grain-processing facility. Today the building is a multi-use facility housing residential lofts, offices, commercial space and the Lockport Gallery. The Gallery's space incorporates the building's original features, including large windows (once arched portals used for loading and unloading), high ceilings, and hardwood floors.

The Gladys Fox Museum

Maintained by the Lockport Township Park District, the Gladys Fox Museum is located in the 1839 Old Congregational Church. Beautifully restored, this historic building is now home to the museum's collection of historical photographs and memorabilia celebrating Dellwood Park and the Illinois and Michigan Canal.

Lincoln Landing

Newly constructed just south of the Gaylord building and directly adjacent to the I&M Canal by the Give Something Back Foundation, the Lincoln Landing is an open air park and museum. The park shows the original I & M Canal lines with a statue of Lincoln contemplating the canal. Bronze medallions are placed all about the park with historical information. Each medallion then leads you to another with connected information.

== Schools ==
=== Taft School District 90 ===
Taft School District 90 lies almost entirely within the southwest part of Lockport. The district dates from before 1888. In the 19th century it was called school district #9 of Lockport Township, and its school was called the South Lockport School. The district now has one school, called Taft School.

=== Milne-Kelvin Grove School District 91 ===
Milne-Kelvin Grove School District 91, also known as Lockport School District 91, lies almost entirely within the west central part of Lockport. It has two grade schools.

Milne Grove Elementary School

Milne Grove has kindergarten through grade three.

Kelvin Grove Middle School

Kelvin Grove has grades four through eight; sixth through eighth grade operate as a middle school.

=== Will County School District 92 ===
Will County School District 92 is a public grade school district which serves grades K–8. It mainly serves the communities of Lockport and Homer Glen. It contains four buildings: Walsh, Reed, Ludwig, and Oak Prairie with the administration building adjacent to Ludwig. The official mascot is a Bulldog for all schools.

Walsh School

Walsh School is an elementary school educating students from PreK through grade one. Mascot: Bulldog

Reed School

Reed School is an elementary school educating students grades two and three. Mascot: Bulldog

Ludwig School

Ludwig School is an elementary school educating students grades four and five. Mascot: Bulldog

Oak Prairie Junior High School

Oak Prairie Junior High School is a junior high school educating students in grades six through eight. It is the most recent of the schools. Mascot: Bulldog

=== High schools ===
Three other grade school districts cover parts of Lockport. The eastern part of Lockport is in Homer Community Consolidated School District 33C. The northern part of Lockport is in Will County School District 92. The southern part of Lockport is served by the Fairmont School District 89.

All of the city is in Lockport Township High School District 205, which operates Lockport Township High School at a Central and East campus, both in the city. The district serves about 3,700 students from the communities of Crest Hill, Fairmont, Homer Glen, Lockport, Homer Township and Lockport Township. The Central Campus opened in 1910 and serves freshman students while the East Campus opened in 1964 and serves sophomores, juniors and seniors.

=== Private schools ===
Lockport has one private grade school: Saints Dennis & Joseph Catholic Academy. The North campus is located at 529 Madison St. and the South campus is located at 1201 S. Washington St.

There are also two private high schools in the area: Providence Catholic High School in New Lenox and Joliet Catholic Academy in Joliet.

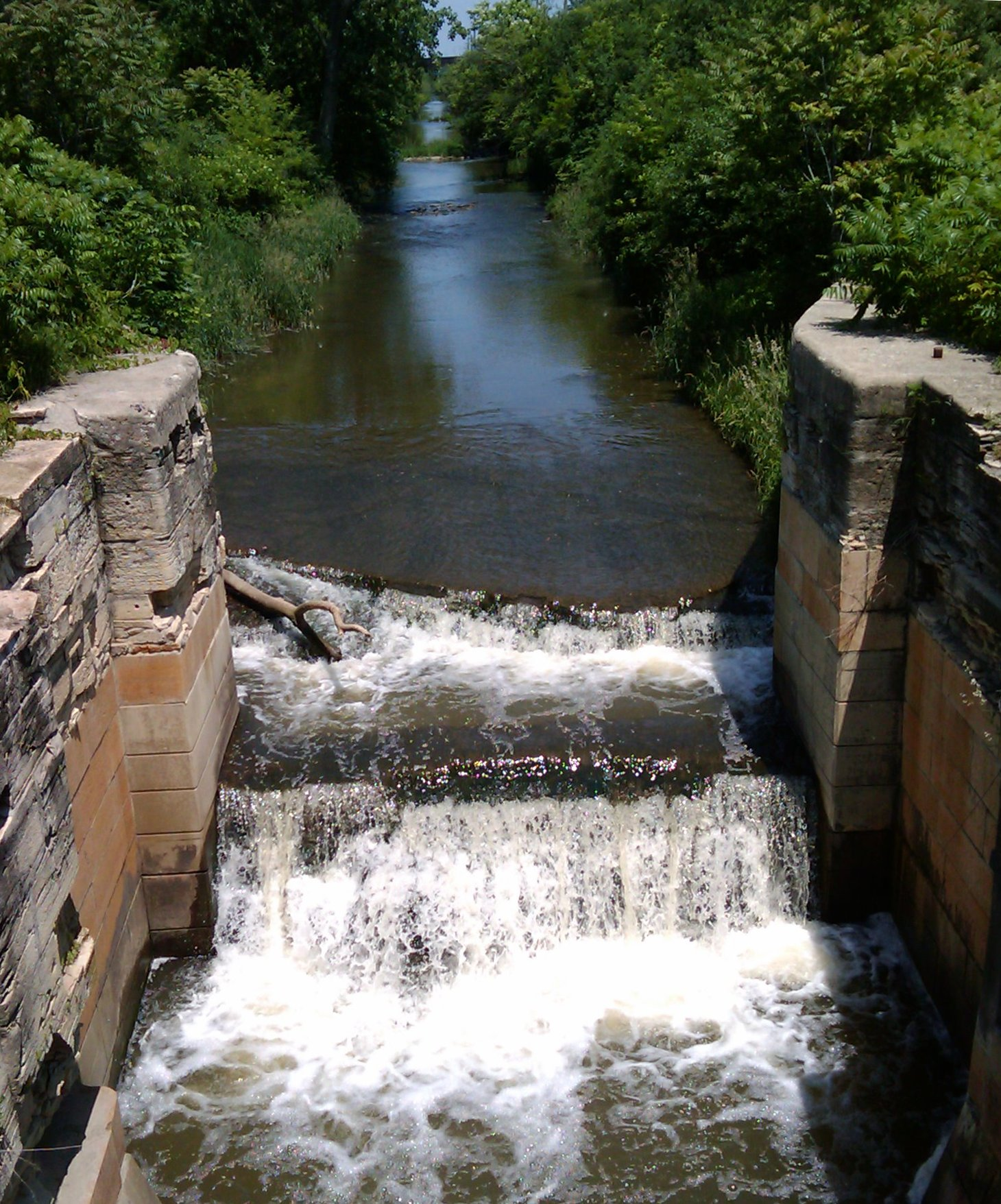
Lock #3, Lockport

== Transportation ==
Lockport has a station on Metra's Heritage Corridor, which provides weekday rush hour rail service between Joliet, and Chicago, Illinois (at Union Station). Lockport is very close to Metra's Rock Island District.

Pace provides bus service on Routes 832 and 834 connecting Lockport to downtown Joliet and other destinations.

=== Major highways ===
Major highways in Lockport include:

Interstate Highways

- Interstate 355

US Highways

- Historic US 66

Illinois Highways

- Route 7 (159th Street)
- Route 53
- Route 171 (State Street)

== In popular culture ==
Some scenes in the 2009 Michael Mann film Public Enemies were shot in Lockport.

The HBO series Somebody, Somewhere filmed in Lockport.

The Image Comics series Radiant Black in the Massive Verse is primarily set in Lockport, being the hometown of main characters Nathan Burnett and Marshall.

== Notable people ==
- Louis Bottino, Illinois state representative and educator, lived in Lockport.
- Harry Decker, MLB all-positions player for several teams
- Jim Donahue, catcher for the New York Metropolitans, Kansas City Cowboys, and Columbus Solons
- Tom Haller, catcher for the San Francisco Giants, Los Angeles Dodgers, and Detroit Tigers
- Richaun Holmes, basketball player for the Washington Wizards
- Austin O'Connor (wrestler), two-time NCAA Champion wrestler for the University of North Carolina-Chapel Hill
- Daniel H. Paddock, Illinois state representative and lawyer, born in Lockport.
- CM Punk, professional wrestler currently signed to WWE and retired mixed martial artist.
- Luke Scanlan, Wisconsin State Assemblyman and farmer, was born near Lockport
- Alando Tucker, basketball player for the Phoenix Suns and Minnesota Timberwolves
- Mike Zimmer, NFL coach, former head coach for the Minnesota Vikings

== Sister city ==
- - Asiago, Vicenza, Veneto, Italy
