= Will County Sheriff's Office =

- Abbreviation: WCSO

Jurisdictional structure
- Operations jurisdiction: Will County, Illinois, Illinois, United States
- Legal jurisdiction: Will County, Illinois
- General nature: Local civilian police

Operational structure
- Headquarters: Joliet, Illinois
- Sworn members: 650 employees at full strength
- Sheriff responsible: Mike Kelley

Website
- willcosheriff.org

The Will County Sheriff's Office is the principal law enforcement agency of Will County, Illinois, United States. It is the second largest sheriff's department in Illinois, with approximately 650 sworn and civilian employees when at full operational strength. It is headed by the Sheriff of Will County, currently Mike Kelley.

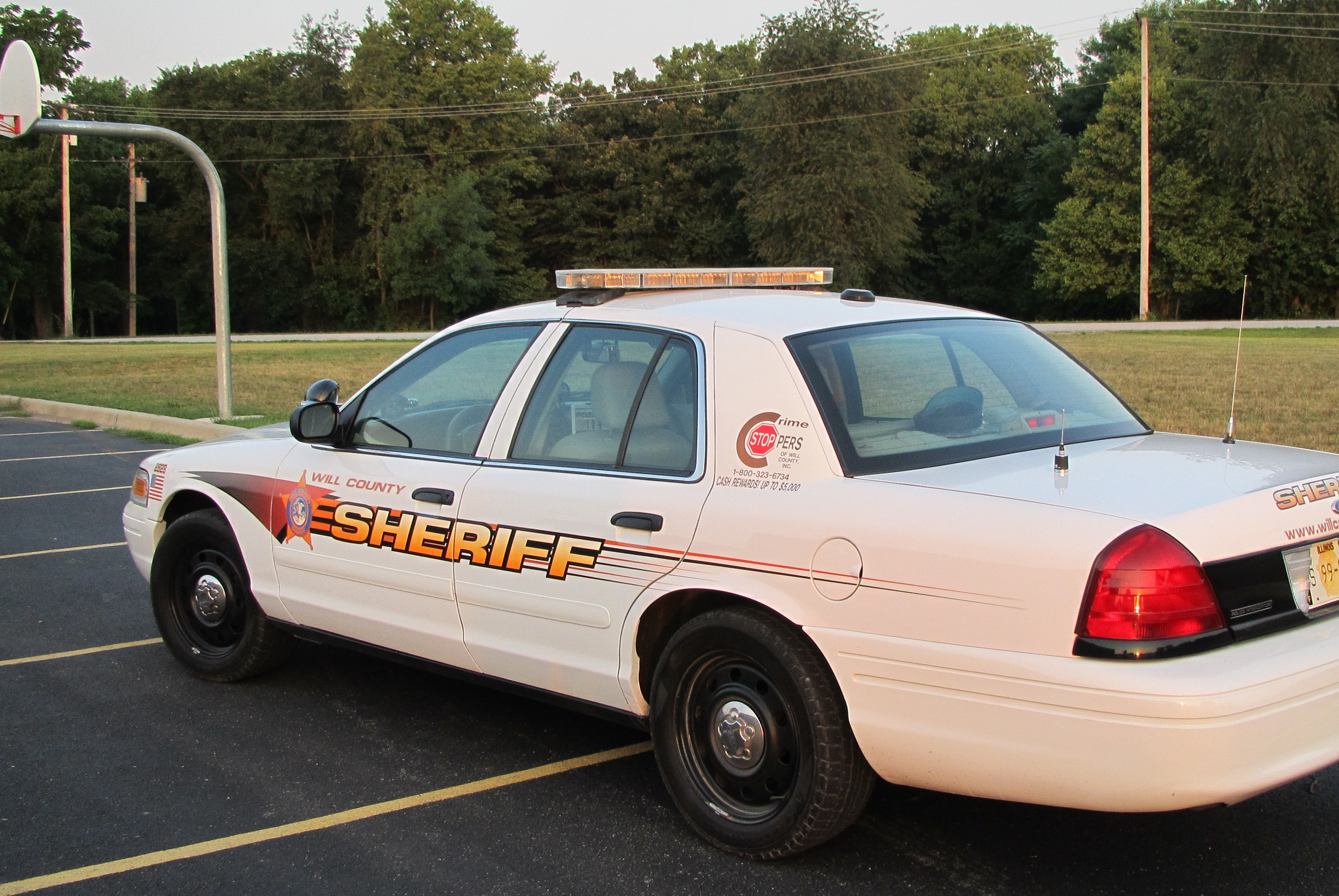
A Ford Crown Victoria Police Interceptor of the Will County Sheriff's Office

== Sheriff's Office divisions ==
The Will County Sheriff's Office is divided into three divisions, administration, law enforcement, and detention (corrections).

- The Administration Division is composed of the Sheriff, Court Services Bureau, and Support Services Bureau. Court Services is responsible for the processing of courthouse, civil business, and processes such as serving subpoenas and warrants, real estate foreclosures, evictions, and property sales. Special Services includes issues such as budgets and planning.
- The Detention Division is responsible for housing inmates both awaiting trial and those who have been sentenced to serve at the Will County Adult Detention Facility. The ADF was expanded in 2009 and can now hold over 1000 inmates. The ADF is one of only 3% of the 3400 jails in the United States to have earned accreditation from the American Correctional Association. The Detention Division when fully staffed has 234 correctional officers and supervisors.
- The Enforcement Division, divided into the Patrol and Special Operations Bureau, is by far the most visible and is charged with patrolling unincorporated areas of Will County as well as assisting suburban police departments with police operations including, but not limited to, criminal investigation, evidence services, traffic accident reconstruction, narcotics investigation, and hostage/barricade incidents. The Patrol Bureau has 190 sworn personnel. Within Will County's 682,829 (2013) total population approximately 115,000 people live in unincorporated areas. There are several census-designated unincorporated populated areas the Sheriff's department is responsible for:

Crystal Lawns, population 1,872
Fairmont, population 2,459
Frankfort Square, population 9,276
Ingalls Park, population 3,314
Lakewood Shores, population 1,347
Preston Heights, population 2,575
Willowbrook, population 2,076
Lockport Heights, population 749
And while Lakewood Falls and Carillon subdivisions are not considered a CDP their combined population is 8,421. Both subdivisions are located on Weber Rd south of I-55.
In addition to the unincorporated areas the Sheriff's department is contracted by Godley & Diamond to patrol their portion of Will County. The Sheriff's department is also contracted to patrol Homer Glen providing 21 deputies and supervisors.

Patrol is divided into 6 areas covering the following townships and village of Homer Glen:

- North (Channahon, DuPage, Joliet, Lockport, Plainfield, Troy, and Wheatland)
- South (Channahon, Custer, Florence, Jackson, Manhattan, Reed, Wesley, Wilmington, and Wilton)
- Central (DuPage, Homer, Jackson, Joliet, Lockport, Manhattan, and New Lenox)
- Homer Glen (Homer Glen)
- Lincolnway (Frankfort, Homer, Manhattan, Mokena, and New Lenox)
- East (Crete, Green Garden, Monee, Peotone, Washington, Will)

== Rank structure and insignia ==
Title	Insignia	Notes
Sheriff		The Sheriff is elected to a 4 year term by the citizens of Will County.
Undersheriff		The Undersheriff is selected by the Sheriff and is the 2nd in command.
Chief Deputy		There is currently only 1 chief deputy and he is in charge of the ADF.
Deputy Chief		There are currently 6 deputy chiefs in charge of the 6 bureaus within the Sheriff's Department.
Lieutenant/ Correctional Lieutenant/ Director		Lieutenants are promoted from a list of sergeants who have tested for lieutenant. Within the department lieutenants serve as shift commanders and section supervisors. Directors are selected by the Sheriff and are largely a political position. There are currently no directors within the department.
Sergeant/ Correctional Sergeant		Sergeants are promoted from a list of deputies/ correctional officer who have been with the department for 4 years and have tested for sergeant. Within the department sergeants are either assigned to a patrol area or a specialized unit to supervise deputies/ correctional officers.
Deputy Sheriff/ Correctional Officer	No Insignia	Deputies and correctional officers are hired from separate tested lists. Correctional officers wanting to "patch over" and become a deputy must test for the position just like civilians.

== Equipment ==
- Deputies and correctional officers are provided all of their uniforms and equipment. Deputies are issued the Glock 17, Remington Model 870, and an X2 Taser. Some deputies are also issued an AR-15. Deputies are provided with a take home squad car equipped with a panasonic toughbook. The uniform consists of dark brown pants and a tan shirt.
