= List of census-designated places in Illinois =

This is a list of census-designated places in the U.S. state of Illinois, by county. Census-designated places (CDPs) are unincorporated communities lacking elected municipal officers and boundaries with legal status. The term "census designated place" has been used as an official classification by the U.S. Census Bureau since 1980. Prior to that, select unincorporated communities were surveyed in the U.S. Census.

== Census designated places in Illinois ==
CDP	County	Location of County	Population (2020)	Population (2010)	Population (2000)	Population (1990)	Population (1980)	Notes
Adair	McDonough		212	210				
Adams	Adams		75					
Alden	McHenry		113	x	x	x	x	
Alexander	Morgan		155	x	x	x	x	
Andres	Will		43	x	x	x	x	
Annapolis	Crawford		106					
Apple Canyon Lake	Jo Daviess		574	558				
Arbury Hills	Will		1,132	x	x	x	x	
Argyle	Boone and Winnebago		332	x	x	x	x	
Baileyville	Ogle and Stephenson		187	x	x	x	x	
Barstow	Rock Island		89	x	x	x	x	
Beason	Logan		147					
Beverly	Adams		72	x	x	x	x	
Big Foot Prairie	McHenry		65	x	x	x	x	
Blairsville	Williamson		243	x	x	x	x	
Bloomfield	Adams		32	x	x	x	x	
Bonnie Brae	Will		1,287	x	x	x	x	
Boody	Macon		232	276				
Boulder Hill	Kendall		8,394	8,108	8,169			
Buffalo Prairie	Rock Island		64	x	x	x	x	
Burton	Adams		103	x	x	x	x	
Burtons Bridge	McHenry		226	x	x	x	x	
Cable	Mercer		117	x	x	x	x	
Cameron	Warren		188	x	x	x	x	
Campbell's Island	Rock Island		275	x	x	x	x	
Candlewick Lake	Boone		5,115					
Carman	Henderson		67	x	x	x	x	
Channel Lake	Lake		1,581	1,664	1,785			
Chemung	McHenry		276	308				
Chestnut	Logan		220	246				
Como	Whiteside		528					
Coral	McHenry		16	x	x	x	x	
Cornland	Logan		89					
Coyne Center	Rock Island		877	827	906			
Crab Orchard	Williamson		356					
Crystal Lawns	Will		1,830	x	x	x	x	
Custer Park	Will		112	x	x	x	x	
Darmstadt	St. Clair		49					
Dayton	LaSalle		528	537				
Dewey	Champaign		105	x	x	x	x	
Dundas	Richland		146	x	x	x	x	
Eagle Lake	Will		76	x	x	x	x	
East Lynn	Vermilion		90	x	x	x	x	
Edgington	Rock Island		391	x	x	x	x	
Eliza	Mercer		25	x	x	x	x	
Elwin	Macon		119	x	x	x	x	
Fairmont	Will		2,389	2,459	2,563			
Fall Creek	Adams		31	x	x	x	x	
Floraville	St. Clair		49					
Forest Lake	Lake		1,784	1,659	1,530			
Fowler	Adams		154	x	x	x	x	
Fox Lake Hills	Lake		2,684	2,591	2,561			
Frankfort Square	Will		8,968	9,276	7,766			
Franklinville	McHenry		38	x	x	x	x	
Gages Lake	Lake		10,637	10,198	10,415			
Galt	Whiteside		193	x	x	x	x	
Garden Prairie	Boone		300					
Georgetown	McDonough		368					
Gilson	Knox		156					
Goodenow	Will		60	x	x	x	x	
Goofy Ridge	Mason		210	350				
Grand Detour	Ogle		424	x	x	x	x	
Grandwood Park	Lake		5,297	5,202	4,521			
Hamlet	Mercer		21	x	x	x	x	
Harding	LaSalle		133	x	x	x	x	
Harmony	McHenry		20	x	x	x	x	
Harrison	Jackson		895	970				
Hartland	McHenry		157	x	x	x	x	
Heritage Lake	Tazewell		1,523					
Holcomb	Ogle		149	x	x	x	x	
Holiday Shores	Madison		2,840	2,882				
Illinois City	Rock Island		159	x	x	x	x	
Ingalls Park	Will		3,460					
Janesville	Coles and Cumberland		76	x	x	x	x	
Joslin	Rock Island		85	x	x	x	x	
Kings	Ogle		146	x	x	x	x	
Kingston	Adams		20					
Knollwood	Lake		2,121	1,747	x	x	x	
La Clede	Fayette		113	x	x	x	x	
Lake Camelot	Peoria		1,798	1,686	x	x	x	
Lake Carroll	Carroll		852	x	x	x	x	
Lake Catherine	Lake		1,279	1,379	1,490			
Lake City	Moultrie		69	x	x	x	x	
Lake Holiday	LaSalle		5,687					
Lake of the Woods	Champaign		2,403	2,912	3,026			
Lake Petersburg	Menard		740	719				
Lake Summerset	Stephenson and Winnebago		2,342					
Lakewood	Shelby		91					
Lakewood Shores	Will		665	1,347				
Lane	DeWitt		95	x	x	x	x	
Langleyville	Christian		391	432				
LaPlace	Piatt		239					
Lawrence	McHenry		220	x	x	x	x	
Lee Center	Lee		146	x	x	x	x	
Literberry	Morgan		71	x	x	x	x	
Lockport Heights	Will		749	x	x	x	x	
Long Lake	Lake		3,663	3,515	3,356			
Lorenzo	Will		26	x	x	x	x	
Lost Nation	Ogle		714	708				
Lowpoint	Woodford		148	x	x	x	x	
Lynn Center	Henry		85	x	x	x	x	
Marcelline	Adams		75	x	x	x	x	
Marley	Will		128	x	x	x	x	
Merritt	Scott		48	x	x	x	x	
Meyer	Adams		18	x	x	x	x	
Millersburg	Mercer		54	x	x	x	x	
Mitchell	Madison		1,217					
Moro	Madison		397	x	x	x	x	
Mossville	Peoria		268	x	x	x	x	
Mulkeytown	Franklin		162	175				
Nachusa	Lee		137	x	x	x	x	
Nekoma	Henry		23	x	x	x	x	
Niota	Hancock		114	x	x	x	x	
Oak Run	Knox		721	547				
Olive Branch	Alexander		650	864				
Olivet	Vermilion		336	428				
Opdyke	Jefferson		236	254				
Ophiem	Henry		123	x	x	x	x	
Osco	Henry		108	x	x	x	x	
Oxville	Scott		24	x	x	x	x	
Paderborn	St. Clair		35					
Paloma	Adams		114	x	x	x	x	
Penfield	Champaign		151	193				
Pistakee Highlands	McHenry		3,237	3,454	3,812			
Plum Valley	Will		632	x	x	x	x	
Prairietown	Madison		153					
Preemption	Mercer		254	x	x	x	x	
Prestbury	Kane		1,657	1,722				
Preston Heights	Will		2,898	2,575	2,527			
Rentchler	St. Clair		45					
Rest Haven	Will		502	x	x	x	x	
Richfield	Adams		26					
Ridgefield	McHenry		210	x	x	x	x	
Ridgewood	Will		2,956	x	x	x	x	
Riggston	Scott		14	x	x	x	x	
Riley	McHenry		10	x	x	x	x	
Ritchie	Will		190	x	x	x	x	
Rock Island Arsenal	Rock Island		182	149	145			
Rockport	Pike		67	x	x	x	x	
Rome	Peoria		1,604	1,738	1,776			
Rosewood Heights	Madison		3,971					
Scott AFB	St. Clair		3,688	3,709	2,707			
Serena	LaSalle		129	x	x	x	x	
Seymour	Champaign		317	303				
Shirley	McLean		135	x	x	x	x	
Smithville	Peoria		157	x	x	x	x	
Solon Mills	McHenry		133	x	x	x	x	
Sunnyland	Will		822	x	x	x	x	
Swedona	Mercer		109	x	x	x	x	
Taylor Ridge	Rock Island		141	x	x	x		
The Galena Territory	Jo Daviess		1,500	1,058				
Trilla	Coles and Cumberland		156	x	x	x	x	
Triumph	LaSalle		100	x	x	x	x	
Trivoli	Peoria		385	x	x	x	x	
Twin Grove	McLean		1,524	1,564				
Unity	Alexander		98	x	x	x	x	
Venetian Village	Lake		2,761	2,826	3,802			
Wedron	LaSalle		140	x	x	x	x	
West Liberty	Jasper		96					
West Union	Clark		271	288				
West York	Crawford		74					
Westervelt	Shelby		131	128	130			
Westlake Village	Winnebago		1,493	x	x	x	x	
White Heath	Piatt		251	290				
Whiteash	Williamson		279					
Willow Lake	Stephenson		1,026	x	x	x	x	
Willowbrook	Will		1,346	2,076	2,130			
Wilton Center	Will		122	x	x	x	x	

== Former census designated places in Illinois ==
- Goodings Grove, incorporated in 2001 and renamed as village of Homer Glen
- West Peoria, incorporated in 1993
- Wonder Lake, annexed by village of Wonder Lake

== See also ==
- List of municipalities in Illinois
- List of Illinois townships
- List of precincts in Illinois
- List of unincorporated communities in Illinois
