= Frankfort Township, Will County, Illinois =

Frankfort Township
- Township
- Location in Will County

- Will County's location in Illinois
- Coordinates: 41°30′42″N 87°51′09″W
- Country: United States
- State: Illinois
- County: Will
- Established: November 6, 1849

Government
  - Supervisor: Jim Moustis

Area
  - Total: 36.83 sq mi (95.39 km^{2})
  - Land: 36.80 sq mi (95.31 km^{2})
  - Water: 0.031 sq mi (0.08 km^{2}) 0.08%
- Elevation: 387 ft (118 m)

Population (2010)
  - Estimate (2016): 59,278
  - Density: 1,550.3/sq mi (598.6/km^{2})
- Time zone: UTC-6 (CST)
  - Summer (DST): UTC-5 (CDT)
- ZIP codes: 60423, 60448, 60467, 60477, 60487
- Area codes: 708, 779, 815
- FIPS code: 17-197-27631
- Website: www.frankforttownship.com

Frankfort Township is one of 24 townships in Will County, Illinois. As of the 2010 census, its population was 57,055 and it contained 19,720 housing units.

== Geography ==
According to the 2010 census, the township has a total area of 36.83 square miles (95.4 km^{2}), of which 36.8 square miles (95 km^{2}) (or 99.92%) is land and 0.03 square miles (0.078 km^{2}) (or 0.08%) is water. It includes almost all of Frankfort and Mokena as well as small portions of Tinley Park and Orland Park.

=== Boundaries ===
Frankfort Township is bordered by Harlem Avenue (Illinois Route 43) on the east (where Cook County and Will County share a border), 183rd Street and Orland Parkway on the north (which is also the Cook-Will county border), Townline Road on the west, and Steger Road on the south.

=== Cities, towns, villages ===
- Frankfort (vast majority)
- Mokena (vast majority)
- Tinley Park (small portion)
- Orland Park (small portion)

=== Other Communities ===
- Arbury Hills at 41.535587°N 87.847549°W
- Frankfort Square

=== Adjacent townships ===
- Orland Township, Cook County (north)
- Bremen Township, Cook County (northeast)
- Rich Township, Cook County (east)
- Monee Township (southeast)
- Green Garden Township (south)
- Manhattan Township (southwest)
- New Lenox Township (west)
- Homer Township (northwest)

=== Cemeteries ===
The township contains these eight cemeteries: Frankfort Township, Frankfort, Pioneer Memorial, Pleasant Hill, Saint John's United Church of Christ, Saint Mary's, Stellwagen, and Union Burial Society.

=== Major highways ===
- U.S. Route 30
- U.S. Route 45
- Interstate 80

=== Lakes ===
- Gun Club Lake

=== Landmarks ===
- Hunters Woods County Forest Preserve
- Hickory Creek Preserve (east three-quarters)

== Demographics ==
Frankfort Township, Illinois – Racial and ethnic composition Note: the US Census treats Hispanic/Latino as an ethnic category. This table excludes Latinos from the racial categories and assigns them to a separate category. Hispanics/Latinos may be of any race.
Race / Ethnicity (NH = Non-Hispanic)	Pop 2000	Pop 2010	Pop 2020	% 2000	% 2010	% 2020
White alone (NH)	38,527	50,090	49,255	93.30%	87.79%	82.37%
Black or African American alone (NH)	506	1,706	2,815	1.23%	2.99%	4.71%
Native American or Alaska Native alone (NH)	38	61	38	0.09%	0.11%	0.06%
Asian alone (NH)	660	1,532	1,836	1.60%	2.69%	3.07%
Native Hawaiian or Pacific Islander alone (NH)	5	9	4	0.01%	0.02%	0.01%
Other race alone (NH)	23	34	113	0.06%	0.06%	0.19%
Mixed race or Multiracial (NH)	253	519	1636	0.61%	0.91%	2.74%
Hispanic or Latino (any race)	1,280	3,104	4,099	3.10%	5.44%	6.85%
Total	41,292	57,055	59,796	100.00%	100.00%	100.00%

Historical population
Census	Pop.	Note	%±
2016 (est.)	59,278
U.S. Decennial Census

== Political districts ==
- Illinois's 1st congressional district
- State House District 37
- State House District 38
- State House District 80
- State Senate District 19
- State Senate District 40
