= Arbury (disambiguation) =

Arbury is a district and electoral ward of Cambridge, England, United Kingdom.

Arbury may also refer to:

- Arbury, an electoral ward of Nuneaton and Bedworth, England, United Kingdom
- Arbury, Saskatchewan, in Rural Municipality of Touchwood No. 248. Canada
- Arbury Hills, Illinois, an unincorporated community, United States

== See also ==
- Arbury Hall, manor house in Warwickshire, England, United Kingdom
- Arbury Hill, Northamptonshire, England, United Kingdom
- Arbury Park, South Australia, an historic home
- Arbury Priory, formerly on the site of Arbury Hall
