= Emma Clara Schweer =

American politician

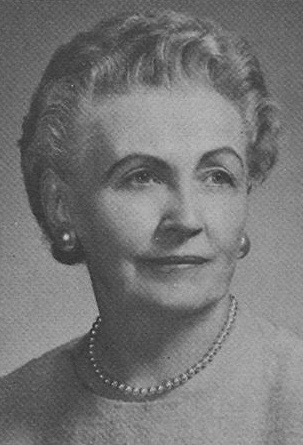
- Schweer in 1965

Tax Collector of Crete Township
- In office 1965 – July 25, 2001
- Preceded by: Arthur F. Schweer

Deputy Tax Collector of Crete Township
- In office 1933–1965

Personal details
- Born: Emma Clara Meier; April 28, 1896 Ocheyedan, Iowa
- Died: July 25, 2001 (aged 105) Chicago Heights, Illinois
- Party: Republican
- Spouse: Arthur Fred Schweer (m. 1923; died 1965)

Emma Clara Schweer (née Meier; April 28, 1896 – July 25, 2001) served as tax collector of Crete Township, Will County, Illinois, and, at the time of her death, was believed to be the oldest elected official in the United States.

== Biography ==
Schweer was born on April 28, 1896, in Ocheyedan, Iowa, and moved to Crete Township in 1905. She attended Trinity Lutheran School, where she took classes in German, and Miles Business College. Schweer became a pilot and later trained World War II pilots.

Schweer's husband, Arthur F. Schweer, held the position of tax collector from its creation in 1933 until his death in 1965; they married in 1923 and he had previously served as Crete's fire chief. Upon his death, Schweer, who had served as his deputy for his entire term, was appointed to the post, and elected in her own right seventeen times, the last in April 2001. During her later years, she was reluctant to run although agreed once nominated. Schweer ran unopposed in many of her later elections.

Schweer was a lifelong Republican and frequently attended Will County Republican Party events. She was also active in the Crete Historical Society, and drove until shortly before her death. She was co-owner of Schweer Gas & Appliance in Crete, along with her husband.

Schweer was also known for her elegant manner of dress; in one incident in 2001 she arrived late to her swearing-in ceremony because her shoes and purse did not match. A friend described her, saying, "Emma was such a refined lady. She always dressed like she was going to church. Toward the end, she had some loss of hearing, but she was very lucid. She read a lot and knew everything that was going on around the world."

Due to her position as the country's oldest elected politician, Schweer received national media attention in 2001, and was featured in the National Enquirer. She died on July 25, 2001, at St. James Hospital in Chicago Heights, Illinois, at the age of 105.

== Electoral history ==
Crete Township tax collector election, 2001
Party	Candidate	Votes	%
Republican	Emma Schweer	2,837	100.00
Total votes		2,837	100.00
