= Rest Haven =

Rest Haven may refer to a location in the United States:

- Rest Haven, Georgia, a town
- Rest Haven, Illinois, a census-designated place
- Rest Haven Cemetery in Franklin, Tennessee; listed on the National Register of Historic Places
