= Wesley Township =

Wesley Township may refer to the following townships in the United States:

- Wesley Township, Will County, Illinois
- Wesley Township, Kossuth County, Iowa
- Wesley Township, Washington County, Ohio
