= Orland Township, Illinois =

Orland Township
- Township
- Flag Seal

- Location in Cook County

- Cook County's location in Illinois
- Coordinates: 41°36′06″N 87°51′13″W
- Country: United States
- State: Illinois
- County: Cook

Area
  - Total: 36.47 sq mi (94.45 km^{2})
  - Land: 35.67 sq mi (92.4 km^{2})
  - Water: 0.72 sq mi (1.9 km^{2}) 1.98%
- Elevation: 705 ft (215 m)

Population (2020)
  - Total: 98,246
  - Density: 2,694/sq mi (1,040/km^{2})
- Time zone: UTC-6 (CST)
  - Summer (DST): UTC-5 (CDT)
- ZIP codes: 60452, 60462, 60467, 60477, 60487
- FIPS code: 17-031-56614
- Website: orlandtownship.org

Orland Township is one of 29 townships in Cook County, Illinois, USA. As of the 2020 census, its population was 98,246.

== Geography ==
According to the 2021 census gazetteer files, Orland Township has a total area of 36.39 square miles (94.25 km^{2}), of which 35.67 square miles (92.38 km^{2}) (or 98.02%) is land and 0.72 square miles (1.86 km^{2}) (or 1.98%) is water. It includes the entire village of Orland Hills, almost all of Orland Park, as well as a large portion of Tinley Park.

=== Boundaries ===
Orland Township is bordered by Harlem Avenue (Illinois Route 43) on the east, 135th Street on the north, Will-Cook Road on the west (where Cook County and Will County share a border), and 183rd Street on the south (which is also the Cook-Will county border).

=== Cities, towns, villages ===
- Homer Glen (small portion)
- Orland Hills
- Orland Park (vast majority)
- Tinley Park (half)

=== Unincorporated towns ===
- Alpine at 41.586422°N 87.881439°W
- Fernway at 41.570034°N 87.823387°W
- Fernway Park at 41.586975°N 87.830055°W

=== Adjacent townships ===
- Palos Township (north)
- Worth Township (northeast)
- Bremen Township (east)
- Rich Township (southeast)
- Frankfort Township, Will County (south)
- New Lenox Township, Will County (southwest)
- Homer Township, Will County (west)
- Lemont Township (northwest)

=== Cemeteries ===
The township contains these five cemeteries: Cooper, German Methodist, Old German Methodist, Orland Park Memorial, and Tinley Park Memorial.

=== Major highways ===
- U.S. Route 6
- Illinois Route 7
- U.S. Route 45
- Illinois Route 43

=== Lakes ===
- Ashbourne Lake
- Laguna Lake
- Lake Lorin
- Turtlehead Lake

=== Landmarks ===
- Orland Grove Forest Preserve (south three-quarters)
- Orland Tract Forest Preserve
- Tinley Creek Woods (Cook County Forest Preserves) (west three-quarters)

== Demographics ==
As of the 2020 census there were 98,246 people, 36,893 households, and 27,075 families residing in the township. The population density was 2,699.88 inhabitants per square mile (1,042.43/km^{2}). There were 38,518 housing units at an average density of 1,058.51 per square mile (408.69/km^{2}). The racial makeup of the township was 82.43% White, 3.80% African American, 0.19% Native American, 4.84% Asian, 0.01% Pacific Islander, 2.43% from other races, and 6.30% from two or more races. Hispanic or Latino of any race were 8.39% of the population.

There were 36,893 households, out of which 29.50% had children under the age of 18 living with them, 61.67% were married couples living together, 8.19% had a female householder with no spouse present, and 26.61% were non-families. 24.00% of all households were made up of individuals, and 12.00% had someone living alone who was 65 years of age or older. The average household size was 2.66 and the average family size was 3.18.

The township's age distribution consisted of 21.3% under the age of 18, 6.6% from 18 to 24, 23.4% from 25 to 44, 29.3% from 45 to 64, and 19.6% who were 65 years of age or older. The median age was 43.6 years. For every 100 females, there were 101.0 males. For every 100 females age 18 and over, there were 96.2 males.

The median income for a household in the township was $89,135, and the median income for a family was $106,267. Males had a median income of $61,760 versus $40,678 for females. The per capita income for the township was $42,478. About 4.9% of families and 5.9% of the population were below the poverty line, including 8.5% of those under age 18 and 7.7% of those age 65 or over.

Historical population
Census	Pop.	Note	%±
2000	91,418		—
2010	97,558		6.7%
2020	98,246		0.7%
U.S. Decennial Census

== Governance ==
Orland Township is governed by a township board of trustees sometimes called the township board or town board. The town board consists of five voting members and includes the elected township supervisor and four elected township trustees.

The town board is responsible for providing a budget and taxes sufficient to run the operations of the township government each year. The supervisor is a voting member of the town board but is also the chief executive officer and the chief financial officer of the township.

The township clerk, assessor and highway commissioner are elected officials; however, they do not have a vote on the town board.

The township supervisor is the chief executive officer of the township and is responsible for the day-to-day operations of the township along with the following other duties:

- Chairing all meetings of the township board
- Serving as township treasurer
- Serving as supervisor of General Assistance
- Serving as supervisor of buildings and grounds

Current township elected officials
Name	Elected position
Paul O'Grady	Supervisor
Cindy Murray	Clerk
Rich Kelly	Assessor
Antonio Rubino	Highway Commissioner
Patrick Feldner	Trustee
Michael Maratea	Trustee
Maria Sanfilippo	Trustee
John Lynch	Trustee

== Politics ==
United States presidential election results for Orland Township, Cook County, Illinois (2000–2024)
Year	Republican		Democratic		Third party(ies)	
Year	No.	%	No.	%	No.	%
2000	16,650	43.95%	20,616	54.42%	617	1.63%
2004	14,164	43.76%	17,856	55.16%	351	1.08%
2008	24,242	50.34%	23,445	48.68%	470	0.98%
2012	25,523	55.66%	19,800	43.18%	534	1.16%
2016	24,841	50.90%	21,711	44.49%	2,248	4.61%
2020	27,853	50.95%	26,261	48.03%	558	1.02%
2024	26,275	53.75%	21,981	44.96%	631	1.29%

=== Political districts ===
The following political districts contain portions of the township:

- Illinois's 1st congressional district
- Illinois's 6th congressional district
- State House District 28
- State House District 35
- State House District 37
- State House District 81
- State Senate District 14
- State Senate District 18
- State Senate District 19
- State Senate District 41
