= Custer Township, Illinois =

Coordinates: 41°13′55″N 88°08′12″W

Custer Township
- Township
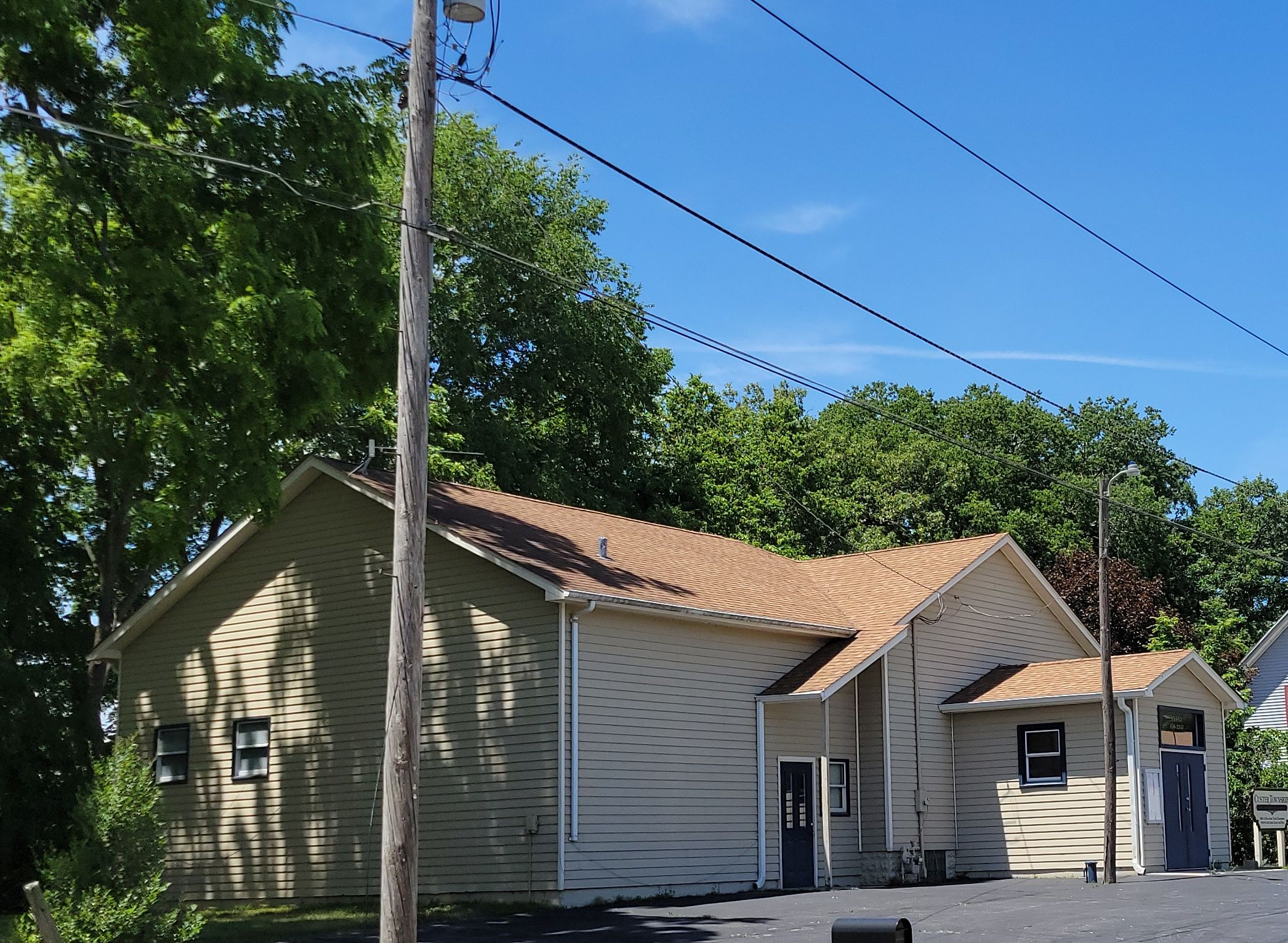
- Township building in Custer Park

- Location in Will County
- Country: United States
- State: Illinois
- County: Will
- Established: 1876

Area
  - Total: 26.35 sq mi (68.2 km^{2})
  - Land: 25.75 sq mi (66.7 km^{2})
  - Water: 0.61 sq mi (1.6 km^{2}) 2.31%

Population (2010)
  - Estimate (2016): 1,415
  - Density: 55.5/sq mi (21.4/km^{2})
- Time zone: UTC-6 (CST)
  - Summer (DST): UTC-5 (CDT)
- FIPS code: 17-197-18199

Custer Township is located in Will County, Illinois. As of the 2010 census, its population was 1,430 and it contained 612 housing units.

== History ==
Custer Township was organized from the eastern part of Reed Township in 1876. It was named for the United States Army officer George Armstrong Custer, who died that year.

== Geography ==
According to the 2010 census, the township has a total area of 26.35 square miles (68.2 km^{2}), of which 25.75 square miles (66.7 km^{2}) (or 97.72%) is land and 0.61 square miles (1.6 km^{2}) (or 2.31%) is water.

== Demographics ==
Historical population
Census	Pop.	Note	%±
2016 (est.)	1,415
U.S. Decennial Census
