= Crete Township, Illinois =

Crete Township
- Township
- Location in Will County
- Country: United States
- State: Illinois
- County: Will
- Established: November 6, 1849

Area
  - Total: 44.38 sq mi (114.9 km^{2})
  - Land: 44.34 sq mi (114.8 km^{2})
  - Water: 0.04 sq mi (0.10 km^{2}) 0.09%

Population (2010)
  - Estimate (2016): 23,530
  - Density: 536.2/sq mi (207.0/km^{2})
- Time zone: UTC-6 (CST)
  - Summer (DST): UTC-5 (CDT)
- FIPS code: 17-197-17536
- Website: cretetownship.com

Crete Township is located in Will County, Illinois. As of the 2010 census, its population was 23,774 and it contained 10,286 housing units. Washington Township was formed from a portion of Crete.

== Geography ==
According to the 2010 census, the township has a total area of 44.38 square miles (114.9 km^{2}), of which 44.34 square miles (114.8 km^{2}) (or 99.91%) is land and 0.04 square miles (0.10 km^{2}) (or 0.09%) is water.

=== Cities, towns, villages ===
- Crete
- Park Forest (small portion)
- Sauk Village (small portion)
- Steger (southwest third)
- University Park (mostly)

=== Other Communities ===
- Faithorn at 41.428089°N 87.608093°W (Note: Faithorn began as a railroad marshalling yard. Not to be confused with Faithorn, Michigan or the township. All are named after the Chicago railroad baron, John Nicholson Faithorn (1852–1914), who served as the president and general manager of the Chicago Terminal Transfer Railroad and was a key figure in the Chicago, Terre Haute & Southeastern Railway. And whose name appeared on "Faithorn jet" and the eponymous “Faithorn yard.” Situated near Crete, Illinois, close to the B&O property line, Faithorn Yard was a historic railroad yard located in Faithorn, Illinois, near the Illinois-Indiana border. It served as the northern terminus of the Milwaukee Road's "South Eastern" line on the Terre Haute Division. It was a key, now-defunct terminal for the Chicago, Terre Haute & Southeastern Railway, later acquired by the Milwaukee Road. It was active through the 1970s before being abandoned, per discussions on Trainorders.com.)
- Goodenow
- Plum Valley
- Willow Brook Estates

== Demographics ==
The population as of 2016 was 23,530.

Historical population
Census	Pop.	Note	%±
2016 (est.)	23,530
U.S. Decennial Census

== Notable people ==
- Emma Clara Schweer, former tax collector of Crete Township and the oldest elected official in the United States

== Sources ==
- Herman, Jenifer (2009). "Faithorn, Michigan". The Encyclopedia of Michigan. Vol. 1. State History Publications. p. 267. ISBN 9780403094196. ISBN 0403094194.
