= Lockport Township, Illinois =

Lockport Township
- Township
- Location in Will County
- Country: United States
- State: Illinois
- County: Will
- Established: November 6, 1849

Area
  - Total: 36.57 sq mi (94.7 km^{2})
  - Land: 35.94 sq mi (93.1 km^{2})
  - Water: 0.63 sq mi (1.6 km^{2}) 1.72%

Population (2010)
  - Estimate (2016): 60,025
  - Density: 1,669.7/sq mi (644.7/km^{2})
- Time zone: UTC-6 (CST)
  - Summer (DST): UTC-5 (CDT)
- FIPS code: 17-197-44238
- Website: www.lockporttownship.com

Lockport Township is located in Will County, Illinois. As of the 2010 census, its population was 60,010 and it contained 22,016 housing units.

== Geography ==
According to the 2010 census, the township has a total area of 36.57 square miles (94.7 km^{2}), of which 35.94 square miles (93.1 km^{2}) (or 98.28%) is land and 0.63 square miles (1.6 km^{2}) (or 1.72%) is water.

=== Cities, Towns, Villages ===
- Crest Hill (vast majority)
- Joliet (small portion)
- Lockport (vast majority)
- Romeoville (half)

=== Other Communities ===
- Bonnie Brae
- Crystal Lawns (small portion)
- Fairmont
- Lockport Heights (part)
- Sunnyland (half)

=== Unincorporated Towns ===
- Rockdale Junction at 41.564198°N 88.106728°W

== Demographics ==
Historical population
Census	Pop.	Note	%±
2016 (est.)	60,025
U.S. Decennial Census

== Academic Institutions ==
- Lockport Township High School
