= Plainfield Township, Illinois =

Plainfield Township
- Township
- Flag Seal

- Location in Will County
- Country: United States
- State: Illinois
- County: Will
- Established: November 6, 1849

Government
  - Supervisor: Tony Fremarek

Area
  - Total: 35.24 sq mi (91.3 km^{2})
  - Land: 33.48 sq mi (86.7 km^{2})
  - Water: 1.76 sq mi (4.6 km^{2}) 4.99%

Population (2010)
  - Estimate (2016): 82,021
  - Density: 2,398.9/sq mi (926.2/km^{2})
- Time zone: UTC-6 (CST)
  - Summer (DST): UTC-5 (CDT)
- FIPS code: 17-197-60300
- Website: Plainfield Township

Plainfield Township is located in Will County, Illinois. As of the 2010 census, its population was 80,318 and it contained 25,333 housing units. Plainfield Township government serves the residents in the Illinois communities of Plainfield, Joliet, Romeoville and Crest Hill. Plainfield Township's boundaries run to the North by 135th Street, to the South by Theodore Street, to the East by Gaylord Road and to the West by County Line Road.
See also Plainfield Public Library District

== Geography ==
According to the 2010 census, the township has a total area of 35.24 square miles (91.3 km^{2}), of which 33.48 square miles (86.7 km^{2}) (or 95.01%) is land and 1.76 square miles (4.6 km^{2}) (or 4.99%) is water.

=== Cities, towns, villages ===
- Crest Hill (small portion)
- Joliet (small portion)
- Plainfield (vast majority)
- Romeoville (small portion)

=== Other Communities ===
- Crystal Lawns (vast majority)
- Sunnyland (half)

=== Unincorporated Towns ===
- Coynes at 41.575584°N 88.142838°W
- Lily Cache at 41.590309°N 88.18145°W
- Walker at 41.617809°N 88.206451°W

== Demographics ==
Historical population
Census	Pop.	Note	%±
2016 (est.)	82,021
U.S. Decennial Census
