= Rest Haven, Illinois =

- Unincorporated community Census designated place
- Location within Illinois Location within the United States
- Coordinates: 41°15′37″N 88°7′57″W
- Country: United States
- State: Illinois
- County: Will
- Township: Wesley

Area
  - Total: 0.77 sq mi (2.00 km^{2})
  - Land: 0.68 sq mi (1.77 km^{2})
  - Water: 0.085 sq mi (0.22 km^{2})
- Elevation: 570 ft (170 m)

Population (2020)
  - Total: 502
  - Density: 733.5/sq mi (283.21/km^{2})
- Time zone: UTC-6 (Central (CST))
  - Summer (DST): UTC-5 (CDT)
- ZIP Code: 60481 (Wilmington)
- Area codes: 815, 779
- FIPS code: 17-63382
- GNIS feature ID: 2806550

Rest Haven is an unincorporated community and census-designated place (CDP) in Will County, Illinois, United States. As of the 2020 census, Rest Haven had a population of 502. It is in the southern part of the county, on the northeast side of the Kankakee River, 3.5 miles (5.6 km) south of Wilmington. It is bordered to the east by Ritchie and to the south, across the Kankakee, by Custer Park.

Rest Haven was first listed as a CDP prior to the 2020 census.

== Demographics ==
Historical population
Census	Pop.	Note	%±
2020	502		—
U.S. Decennial Census

Rest Haven first appeared as a census designated place in the 2020 U.S. census.

=== 2020 census ===
Rest Haven CDP, Illinois – Racial and ethnic composition Note: the US Census treats Hispanic/Latino as an ethnic category. This table excludes Latinos from the racial categories and assigns them to a separate category. Hispanics/Latinos may be of any race.
Race / Ethnicity (NH = Non-Hispanic)	Pop 2020	% 2020
White alone (NH)	445	88.65%
Black or African American alone (NH)	0	0.00%
Native American or Alaska Native alone (NH)	2	0.40%
Asian alone (NH)	2	0.40%
Pacific Islander alone (NH)	0	0.00%
Some Other Race alone (NH)	2	0.40%
Mixed Race or Multi-Racial (NH)	25	4.98%
Hispanic or Latino (any race)	26	5.18%
Total	502	100.00%

== Education ==
It is in the Wilmington Community Unit School District 209U.
