= Will County, Illinois =

County in Illinois, United States

- County
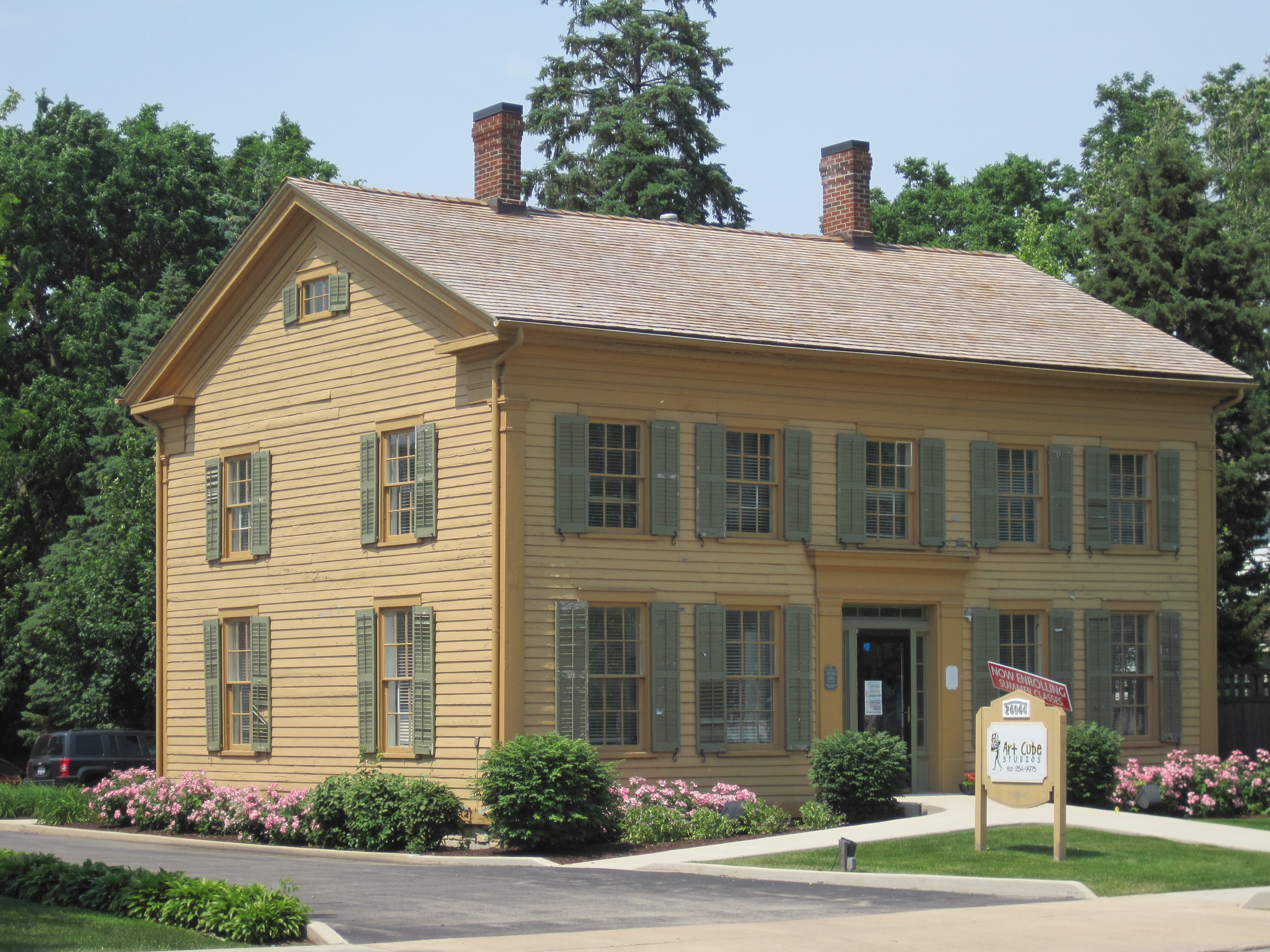
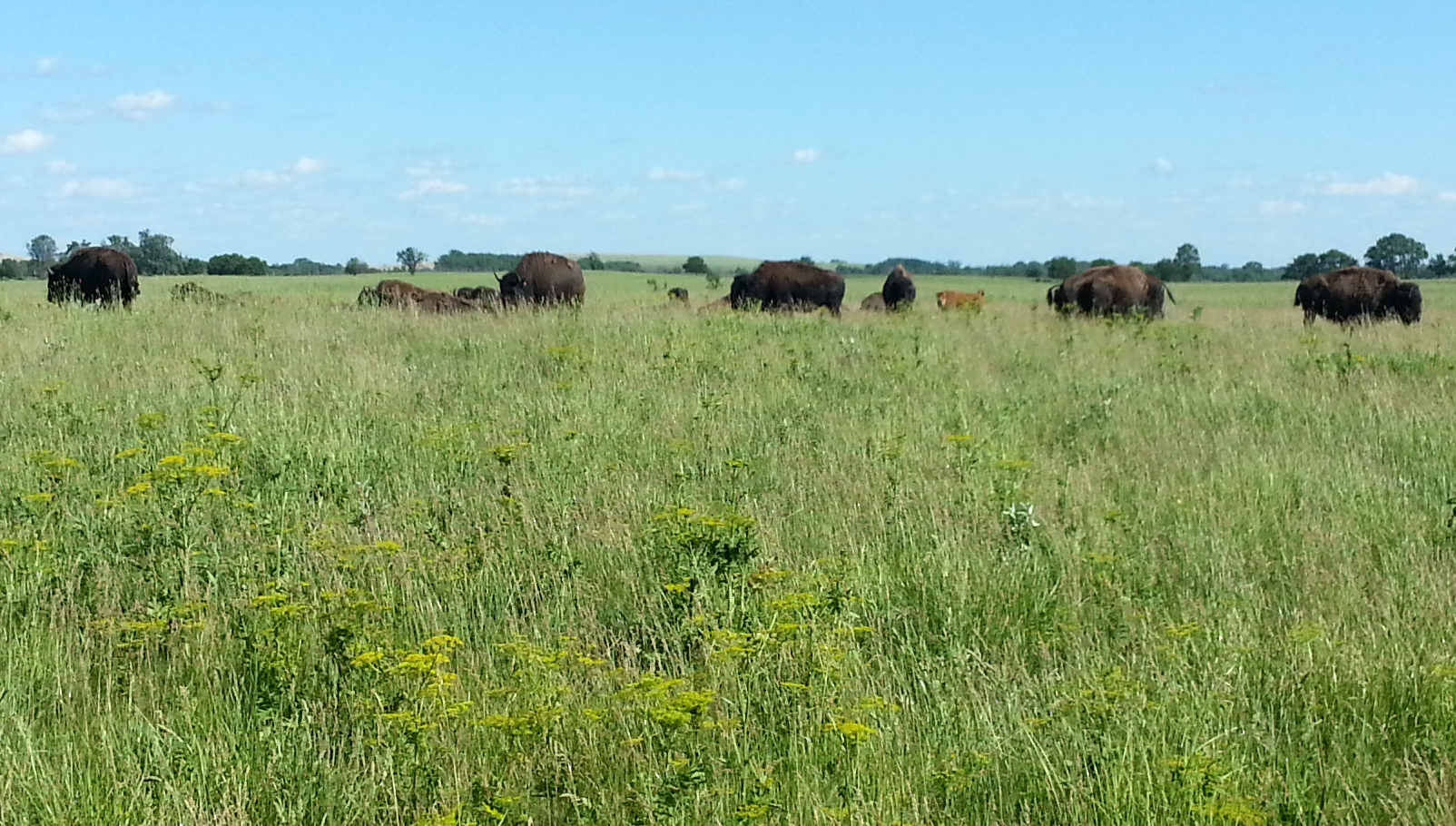
- Flanders House in Plainfield (1840), Midewin National Tallgrass Prairie.

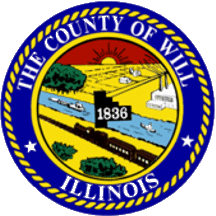
- Flag Seal

- Location within the U.S. state of Illinois
- Coordinates: 41°26′42″N 87°58′43″W
- Country: United States
- State: Illinois
- Founded: January 12, 1836
- Named for: Conrad Will
- Seat: Joliet
- Largest city: Joliet

Area
  - Total: 849 sq mi (2,200 km^{2})
  - Land: 837 sq mi (2,170 km^{2})
  - Water: 12 sq mi (31 km^{2}) 1.5%

Population (2020)
  - Total: 696,355
  - Estimate (2025): 712,253 ▲
  - Density: 832/sq mi (321/km^{2})
- Time zone: UTC−6 (Central)
  - Summer (DST): UTC−5 (CDT)
- Congressional districts: 1st, 2nd, 11th, 14th
- Website: willcounty.gov

Will County is located in the northeastern part of the state of Illinois. According to the 2020 census, it had a population of 696,355, an increase of 2.8% from 677,560 in 2010, making it Illinois's fourth-most populous county. The county seat is Joliet. Will County is one of the five collar counties of the Chicago metropolitan area. The portion of Will County around Joliet uses area codes 815 and 779, while 630 and 331 are for far northern Will County and 708 is for central and eastern Will County.

== History ==
Will County was formed on January 12, 1836, out of Cook and Iroquois Counties. It was named after Conrad Will, a politician and businessman involved in salt production in southern Illinois. Will was a member of the first Illinois Constitutional Convention and a member of the Illinois legislature until his death in 1835. The county originally included the part of Kankakee County, Illinois, north of the Kankakee River. It lost that area when Kankakee County was organized in 1852. Since then its boundaries have not changed.

36 locations in Will County are on the National Register of Historic Places.

"WILL, a county in the E. N. E. part of Illinois, bordering on Indiana, has an area of 1,236 square miles (3,200 km^{2}). It is intersected by the Kankakee and Des Plaines Rivers, branches of the Illinois. The surface is generally level, and destitute of timber, excepting small groves. The soil is very fertile, and much of it is under cultivation. The soil of the prairies is a deep, sandy loam, adapted to Indian corn and grass. In 1850 the county produced 527,903 bushels of Indian corn; 230,885 of wheat; 334,360 of oats; 32,043 tons of hay, and 319,054 pounds of butter. It contained 14 churches, 3 newspaper offices; 3472 pupils attending public schools, and 200 attending other schools. Quarries of building stone are worked near the county seat. The Des Plaines river furnishes water-power. The county is intersected by the Illinois and Michigan canal, by the Chicago branch of the Central railroad, the Chicago and Mississippi, and by the Chicago and Rock Island railroad. Named in honor of Conrad Will, for many years a member of the Illinois legislature. Capital, Joliet. Population 16,703."

— 1854 U.S. Gazetteer
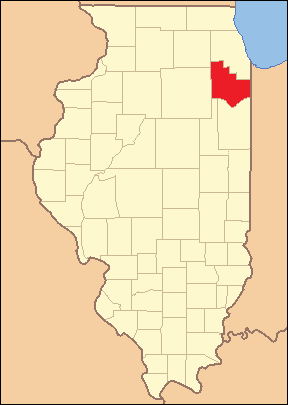
Will County from its 1836 creation to 1852

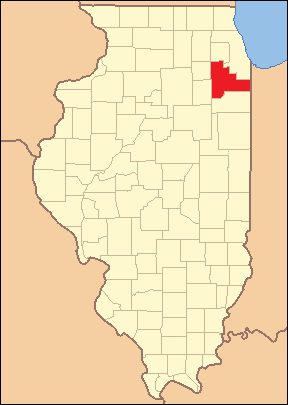
Will County since 1853, with borders reduced by the creation of Kankakee County

== Geography ==
According to the U.S. Census Bureau, the county has an area of 849 square miles (2,200 km^{2}), of which 837 square miles (2,170 km^{2}) is land and 12 square miles (31 km^{2}) (1.5%) is water.

The Kankakee River, Du Page River and the Des Plaines River run through the county and join on its western border. The Illinois and Michigan Canal and the Chicago Sanitary and Ship Canal run through Will County.

A number of areas are preserved as parks (over 20,000 acres (81 km^{2}) total) under the Forest Preserve District of Will County. The 17,000 acres (69 km^{2}) Midewin National Tallgrass Prairie is a U.S. Forest Service park in the county on the grounds of the former Joliet Arsenal. Other parks include Channahon State Park and the Des Plaines Fish and Wildlife Area.

=== Climate and weather ===
Joliet, Illinois

Climate chart (precipitation, max. and min. temperature)
J	F	M	A	M	J	J	A	S	O	N	D
1.6 30 13	1.6 35 19	2.5 47 28	3.8 60 37	3.9 72 48	4.2 81 58	4.3 85 63	3.8 82 61	3.1 76 53	2.7 64 41	3 48 31	2.4 35 20
- █ Average max. and min. temperatures in °F
- █ Precipitation totals in inches
- Source: The Weather Channel
Metric conversion
J	F	M	A	M	J	J	A	S	O	N	D
40 −1 −11	42 2 −7	62 8 −2	95 16 3	98 22 9	107 27 14	110 29 17	97 28 16	80 24 12	69 18 5	76 9 −1	62 2 −7
- █ Average max. and min. temperatures in °C
- █ Precipitation totals in mm

In recent years, average temperatures in the county seat of Joliet have ranged from a low of 13 °F (−11 °C) in January to a high of 85 °F (29 °C) in July, although a record low of −26 °F (−32 °C) was recorded in January 1985 and a record high of 104 °F (40 °C) was recorded in June 1988. Average monthly precipitation ranged from 1.58 inches (40 mm) in January to 4.34 inches (110 mm) in July.

=== Adjacent counties ===
- Kane County (northwest)
- DuPage County (north)
- Cook County (northeast)
- Lake County, Indiana (east)
- Kankakee County (south)
- Grundy County (southwest)
- Kendall County (west)

== Demographics ==
Historical population
Census	Pop.	Note	%±
1840	10,167		—
1850	16,703		64.3%
1860	29,321		75.5%
1870	43,013		46.7%
1880	53,422		24.2%
1890	62,007		16.1%
1900	74,764		20.6%
1910	84,371		12.8%
1920	92,911		10.1%
1930	110,732		19.2%
1940	114,210		3.1%
1950	134,336		17.6%
1960	191,617		42.6%
1970	249,498		30.2%
1980	324,460		30.0%
1990	357,313		10.1%
2000	502,266		40.6%
2010	677,560		34.9%
2020	696,355		2.8%
2025 (est.)	712,253	▲	2.3%
U.S. Decennial Census; 1790–1960 1900–1990; 1990–2000 2010 2020

=== 2020 census ===
As of the 2020 census, the county had a population of 696,355. The median age was 39.0 years. 24.5% of residents were under the age of 18 and 14.1% of residents were 65 years of age or older. For every 100 females there were 97.6 males, and for every 100 females age 18 and over there were 95.6 males age 18 and over.

The racial makeup of the county was 63.7% White, 11.6% Black or African American, 0.6% American Indian and Alaska Native, 6.2% Asian, <0.1% Native Hawaiian and Pacific Islander, 7.8% from some other race, and 10.1% from two or more races. Hispanic or Latino residents of any race comprised 18.8% of the population.

95.1% of residents lived in urban areas, while 4.9% lived in rural areas.

There were 240,009 households in the county, of which 37.3% had children under the age of 18 living in them. Of all households, 58.1% were married-couple households, 14.2% were households with a male householder and no spouse or partner present, and 22.0% were households with a female householder and no spouse or partner present. About 20.3% of all households were made up of individuals and 8.9% had someone living alone who was 65 years of age or older.

There were 250,678 housing units, of which 4.3% were vacant. Among occupied housing units, 81.1% were owner-occupied and 18.9% were renter-occupied. The homeowner vacancy rate was 1.2% and the rental vacancy rate was 6.9%.

=== Racial and ethnic composition ===
Will County, Illinois – Racial and ethnic composition Note: the US Census treats Hispanic/Latino as an ethnic category. This table excludes Latinos from the racial categories and assigns them to a separate category. Hispanics/Latinos may be of any race.
Race / Ethnicity (NH = Non-Hispanic)	Pop 1980	Pop 1990	Pop 2000	Pop 2010	Pop 2020	% 1980	% 1990	% 2000	% 2010	% 2020
White alone (NH)	275,048	294,103	388,523	455,577	418,418	84.77%	82.31%	77.35%	67.24%	60.09%
Black or African American alone (NH)	31,227	37,752	51,980	74,419	79,256	9.62%	10.57%	10.35%	10.98%	11.38%
Native American or Alaska Native alone (NH)	484	617	672	814	711	0.15%	0.17%	0.13%	0.12%	0.10%
Asian alone (NH)	2,816	4,608	11,021	30,458	42,416	0.87%	1.29%	2.19%	4.50%	6.09%
Native Hawaiian or Pacific Islander alone (NH)	x	x	120	104	82	x	x	0.02%	0.02%	0.01%
Other race alone (NH)	1,107	260	536	751	2,105	0.34%	0.07%	0.11%	0.11%	0.30%
Mixed race or Multiracial (NH)	x	x	5,646	9,620	22,516	x	x	1.12%	1.42%	3.23%
Hispanic or Latino (any race)	13,778	19,973	43,768	105,817	130,851	4.25%	5.59%	8.71%	15.62%	18.79%
Total	324,460	357,313	502,266	677,560	696,355	100.00%	100.00%	100.00%	100.00%	100.00%

==== Racial / Ethnic Profile of places in Will County, Illinois (2020 census) ====
Racial / Ethnic Profile of places in Will County, Illinois (2020 Census)
Following is a table of towns and census designated places in Will County, Illinois. Data for the United States (with and without Puerto Rico), the state of Illinois, and Will County itself have been included for comparison purposes.
The majority racial/ethnic group is coded per the key below. Communities that extend into and adjacent county or counties are delineated with a ‡ followed by an accompanying explanatory note. The full population of each community has been tabulated including the population in adjacent counties.

Majority minority with no dominant group
Majority White
Majority Black
Majority Hispanic
Majority Asian

Racial and ethnic composition of places in Will County, Illinois (2020 Census) (NH = Non-Hispanic) Note: the US Census treats Hispanic/Latino as an ethnic category. This table excludes Latinos from the racial categories and assigns them to a separate category. Hispanics/Latinos may be of any race.
Place	Designation	Total Population	White alone (NH)	%	Black or African American alone (NH)	%	Native American or Alaska Native alone (NH)	%	Asian alone (NH)	%	Pacific Islander alone (NH)	%	Other race alone (NH)	%	Mixed race or Multiracial (NH)	%	Hispanic or Latino (any race)	%
United States of America (50 states and D.C.)	x	331,449,281	191,697,647	57.84%	39,940,338	12.05%	2,251,699	0.68%	19,618,719	5.92%	622,018	0.19%	1,689,833	0.51%	13,548,983	4.09%	62,080,044	18.73%
United States of America (50 states, D.C., and Puerto Rico)	x	334,735,155	191,722,195	57.28%	39,944,624	11.93%	2,252,011	0.67%	19,621,465	5.86%	622,109	0.19%	1,692,341	0.51%	13,551,323	4.05%	65,329,087	19.52%
Illinois	State	12,812,508	7,472,751	58.32%	1,775,612	13.86%	16,561	0.13%	747,280	5.83%	2,959	0.02%	45,080	0.35%	414,855	3.24%	2,337,410	18.24%
Will County	County	696,355	418,418	60.09%	79,256	11.38%	711	0.10%	42,416	6.09%	82	0.01%	2,105	0.30%	22,516	3.23%	130,851	18.79%
Aurora ‡	City	180,542	61,017	33.80%	18,930	10.49%	207	0.11%	19,659	10.89%	61	0.03%	655	0.36%	5,032	2.79%	74,981	41.53%
Braidwood	City	6,194	5,354	86.44%	56	0.90%	8	0.13%	20	0.32%	0	0.00%	4	0.06%	306	4.94%	446	7.20%
Crest Hill	City	20,459	9,911	48.44%	4,460	21.80%	20	0.10%	513	2.51%	1	0.00%	49	0.24%	633	3.09%	4,872	23.81%
Joliet ‡	City	150,362	67,903	45.16%	23,814	15.84%	156	0.10%	2,927	1.95%	21	0.01%	464	0.31%	4,567	3.04%	50,510	33.59%
Lockport	City	26,094	21,818	83.61%	395	1.51%	12	0.05%	455	1.74%	1	0.00%	57	0.22%	797	3.05%	2,559	9.81%
Naperville ‡	City	149,540	92,603	61.93%	7,326	4.90%	104	0.07%	33,269	22.25%	44	0.03%	612	0.41%	5,208	3.48%	10,374	6.94%
Wilmington	City	5,664	5,016	88.56%	64	1.13%	16	0.28%	24	0.42%	1	0.02%	14	0.25%	234	4.13%	295	5.21%
Beecher	Village	4,713	3,914	83.05%	174	3.69%	5	0.11%	45	0.95%	0	0.00%	6	0.13%	129	2.74%	440	9.34%
Bolingbrook ‡	Village	73,922	26,735	36.17%	14,120	19.10%	86	0.12%	10,160	13.74%	12	0.02%	294	0.40%	2,667	3.61%	19,848	26.85%
Channahon ‡	Village	13,383	11,144	83.27%	168	1.26%	8	0.06%	96	0.72%	6	0.04%	55	0.41%	518	3.87%	1,388	10.37%
Coal City ‡	Village	5,705	5,039	88.33%	33	0.58%	14	0.25%	19	0.33%	0	0.00%	11	0.19%	188	3.30%	401	7.03%
Crete	Village	8,465	4,048	47.82%	3,044	35.96%	17	0.20%	75	0.89%	1	0.01%	45	0.53%	346	4.09%	889	10.50%
Diamond ‡	Village	2,640	2,276	86.21%	24	0.91%	5	0.19%	14	0.53%	3	0.11%	7	0.27%	135	5.11%	176	6.67%
Elwood	Village	2,229	1,915	85.91%	45	2.02%	6	0.27%	13	0.58%	1	0.04%	6	0.27%	50	2.24%	193	8.66%
Frankfort ‡	Village	20,296	16,168	79.66%	1,738	8.56%	9	0.04%	659	3.25%	1	0.00%	41	0.20%	589	2.90%	1,091	5.38%
Godley	Village	566	509	89.93%	5	0.88%	3	0.53%	1	0.18%	0	0.00%	0	0.00%	22	3.89%	26	4.59%
Homer Glen ‡	Village	24,543	21,750	88.62%	198	0.81%	12	0.05%	406	1.65%	1	0.00%	31	0.13%	575	2.34%	1,570	6.40%
Manhattan	Village	9,385	8,186	87.22%	134	1.43%	11	0.12%	46	0.49%	0	0.00%	24	0.26%	282	3.00%	702	7.48%
Minooka ‡	Village	12,758	9,804	76.85%	403	3.16%	14	0.11%	130	1.02%	0	0.00%	31	0.24%	507	3.97%	1,869	14.65%
Mokena	Village	19,887	17,317	87.08%	347	1.74%	14	0.07%	398	2.00%	2	0.01%	25	0.13%	470	2.36%	1,314	6.61%
Monee	Village	5,128	2,928	57.10%	1,350	26.33%	8	0.16%	118	2.30%	1	0.02%	13	0.25%	171	3.33%	539	10.51%
New Lenox	Village	27,214	23,808	87.48%	314	1.15%	22	0.08%	290	1.07%	3	0.01%	39	0.14%	795	2.92%	1,943	7.14%
Orland Park ‡	Village	58,703	47,336	80.64%	1,984	3.38%	43	0.07%	3,132	5.34%	5	0.01%	170	0.29%	1,373	2.34%	4,660	7.94%
Oswego ‡	Village	34,585	23,400	67.66%	2,574	7.44%	30	0.09%	1,588	4.59%	7	0.02%	153	0.44%	1,417	4.10%	5,416	15.66%
Park Forest ‡	Village	21,687	3,828	17.65%	15,022	69.27%	25	0.12%	150	0.69%	9	0.04%	131	0.60%	840	3.87%	1,682	7.76%
Peotone	Village	4,150	3,672	88.48%	40	0.96%	0	0.00%	21	0.51%	0	0.00%	7	0.17%	145	3.49%	265	6.39%
Plainfield ‡	Village	44,762	30,435	67.99%	3,048	6.81%	51	0.11%	4,299	9.60%	10	0.02%	140	0.31%	1,668	3.73%	5,111	11.42%
Rockdale	Village	2,012	1,015	50.45%	138	6.86%	2	0.10%	9	0.45%	0	0.00%	10	0.50%	80	3.98%	758	37.67%
Romeoville	Village	39,863	16,654	41.78%	5,362	13.45%	32	0.08%	2,718	6.82%	2	0.01%	121	0.30%	1,166	2.93%	13,808	34.64%
Shorewood	Village	18,186	13,391	73.63%	1,155	6.35%	7	0.04%	516	2.84%	0	0.00%	56	0.31%	600	3.30%	2,461	13.53%
Steger ‡	Village	9,584	4,536	47.33%	2,481	25.89%	12	0.13%	74	0.77%	2	0.02%	56	0.58%	388	4.05%	2,035	21.23%
Symerton	Village	128	121	94.53%	0	0.00%	1	0.78%	0	0.00%	0	0.00%	1	0.78%	2	1.56%	3	2.34%
Tinley Park ‡	Village	55,971	43,852	78.35%	3,540	6.32%	7	0.01%	2,345	4.19%	5	0.01%	129	0.23%	1,397	2.50%	4,696	8.39%
University Park ‡	Village	7,145	346	4.84%	6,199	86.76%	14	0.20%	18	0.25%	0	0.00%	49	0.69%	230	3.22%	289	4.04%
Woodridge ‡	Village	34,158	19,880	58.20%	3,346	9.80%	41	0.12%	4,519	13.23%	15	0.04%	150	0.44%	1,152	3.37%	5,055	14.80%
Andres	CDP	43	33	76.74%	0	0.00%	0	0.00%	0	0.00%	0	0.00%	0	0.00%	5	11.63%	5	11.63%
Arbury Hills	CDP	1,132	916	80.92%	9	0.80%	4	0.35%	16	1.41%	0	0.00%	0	0.00%	51	4.51%	136	12.01%
Bonnie Brae	CDP	1,287	960	74.59%	13	1.01%	4	0.31%	13	1.01%	0	0.00%	6	0.47%	83	6.45%	208	16.16%
Crystal Lawns	CDP	1,830	1,375	75.14%	35	1.91%	4	0.22%	7	0.38%	0	0.00%	4	0.22%	70	3.83%	335	18.31%
Custer Park	CDP	112	94	83.93%	0	0.00%	0	0.00%	0	0.00%	0	0.00%	0	0.00%	4	3.57%	14	12.50%
Eagle Lake	CDP	76	62	81.58%	3	3.95%	0	0.00%	2	2.63%	0	0.00%	0	0.00%	3	3.95%	6	7.89%
Fairmont	CDP	2,389	659	27.58%	768	32.15%	6	0.25%	5	0.21%	0	0.00%	14	0.59%	80	3.35%	857	35.87%
Frankfort Square	CDP	8,968	7,312	81.53%	265	2.95%	9	0.10%	183	2.04%	1	0.01%	22	0.25%	265	2.95%	911	10.16%
Goodenow	CDP	60	55	91.67%	0	0.00%	0	0.00%	0	0.00%	0	0.00%	0	0.00%	2	3.33%	3	5.00%
Ingalls Park	CDP	3,460	1,316	38.03%	359	10.38%	3	0.09%	22	0.64%	0	0.00%	19	0.55%	104	3.01%	1,637	47.31%
Lakewood Shores	CDP	665	606	91.13%	3	0.45%	0	0.00%	3	0.45%	0	0.00%	0	0.00%	104	15.64%	33	4.96%
Lockport Heights	CDP	749	642	85.71%	2	0.27%	2	0.27%	2	0.27%	0	0.00%	9	1.20%	43	5.74%	49	6.54%
Lorenzo	CDP	26	25	96.15%	0	0.00%	0	0.00%	0	0.00%	0	0.00%	1	3.85%	0	0.00%	0	0.00%
Marley	CDP	128	120	93.75%	0	0.00%	0	0.00%	0	0.00%	0	0.00%	0	0.00%	5	3.91%	3	2.34%
Plum Valley	CDP	632	294	46.52%	223	35.28%	2	0.32%	1	0.16%	0	0.00%	0	0.00%	26	4.11%	86	13.61%
Preston Heights	CDP	2,898	521	17.98%	1,428	49.28%	5	0.17%	6	0.21%	0	0.00%	20	0.69%	86	2.97%	832	28.71%
Rest Haven	CDP	502	445	88.65%	0	0.00%	2	0.40%	2	0.40%	0	0.00%	2	0.40%	25	4.98%	26	5.18%
Ridgewood	CDP	2,956	591	19.99%	225	7.61%	6	0.20%	10	0.34%	0	0.00%	6	0.20%	40	1.35%	2,078	70.30%
Ritchie	CDP	190	168	88.42%	0	0.00%	0	0.00%	3	1.58%	0	0.00%	0	0.00%	4	2.11%	15	7.89%
Sunnyland	CDP	822	486	59.12%	18	2.19%	5	0.61%	19	2.31%	0	0.00%	4	0.49%	54	6.57%	236	28.71%
Willowbrook Estates	CDP	1,346	475	35.29%	692	51.41%	1	0.07%	10	0.74%	0	0.00%	1	0.07%	43	3.19%	124	9.21%
Wilton Center	CDP	122	108	88.52%	1	0.82%	0	0.00%	0	0.00%	0	0.00%	0	0.00%	0	0.00%	13	10.66%

=== 2010 census ===
As of the 2010 Census, there were 677,560 people, 225,256 households, and 174,062 families residing in the county. The population density was 809.6 inhabitants per square mile (312.6/km^{2}). There were 237,501 housing units at an average density of 283.8 per square mile (109.6/km^{2}). The racial makeup of the county was 76.0% white, 11.2% black or African American, 4.6% Asian, 0.3% American Indian, 5.8% from other races, and 2.3% from two or more races. Those of Hispanic or Latino origin made up 15.6% of the population. In terms of ancestry, 21.6% were German, 18.6% were Irish, 13.3% were Polish, 11.1% were Italian, 5.9% were English, and 2.1% were American.

Of the 225,256 households, 44.0% had children under 18 living with them, 61.9% were married couples living together, 10.9% had a female householder with no husband present, 22.7% were non-families, and 18.5% of all households were made up of individuals. The average household size was 2.97 and the average family size was 3.41. The median age was 35.4.

The median income for a household in the county was $75,906 and the median income for a family was $85,488. Males had a median income of $60,867 versus $40,643 for females. The per capita income was $29,811. About 5.0% of families and 6.6% of the population were below the poverty line, including 9.0% of those under 18 and 5.6% of those 65 or older.

== Government ==
Will County is governed by a 22-member county board elected from 11 districts. Each district elects two members. The county executive, county clerk, coroner, auditor, treasurer, recorder of deeds, state's attorney, and sheriff are all elected in a countywide vote. The current county executive is Jennifer Bertino-Tarrant, who took office in 2020.

Will County government has been housed in a succession of courthouses, the first being erected in 1837. The fourth courthouse was designed of reinforced concrete in the Brutalist style by Otto Stark of C.F. Murphy Associates and completed in 1969. Citing lack of space, inefficiency and high operating costs, the County Board chose to erect a new courthouse, which was designed by Wight & Co. and completed in 2020.

== Politics ==
Like most of the collar counties, Will County was once a Republican stronghold. It went Republican in all but three elections from 1892 to 1988. Since the 1990s, it has become a swing county. It voted for the national winner in every presidential election from 1980 to 2012. In 2016, Chicago-born Hillary Clinton won Will along with the rest of the collar counties aside from McHenry despite losing the election overall. In 2020, Will once again voted for the national winner, Joe Biden, before voting for the losing candidate, Kamala Harris, four years later in 2024.

United States presidential election results for Will County, Illinois
Year	Republican		Democratic		Third party(ies)	
Year	No.	%	No.	%	No.	%
1892	6,720	49.51%	6,434	47.40%	420	3.09%
1896	9,249	56.94%	6,873	42.32%	120	0.74%
1900	10,056	59.22%	6,655	39.19%	269	1.58%
1904	10,001	66.39%	3,191	21.18%	1,873	12.43%
1908	10,358	61.29%	5,693	33.68%	850	5.03%
1912	3,331	19.87%	4,717	28.13%	8,719	52.00%
1916	19,881	62.59%	11,378	35.82%	506	1.59%
1920	21,746	76.37%	5,410	19.00%	1,318	4.63%
1924	22,780	64.16%	4,707	13.26%	8,018	22.58%
1928	26,081	55.02%	20,877	44.04%	447	0.94%
1932	25,173	48.16%	25,798	49.36%	1,295	2.48%
1936	25,028	45.25%	28,135	50.86%	2,151	3.89%
1940	32,291	52.13%	29,442	47.53%	213	0.34%
1944	30,058	52.32%	27,085	47.14%	310	0.54%
1948	28,601	51.41%	26,430	47.51%	597	1.07%
1952	38,533	56.34%	29,749	43.50%	110	0.16%
1956	45,628	64.34%	25,188	35.52%	100	0.14%
1960	42,575	50.86%	41,056	49.04%	81	0.10%
1964	38,619	43.75%	49,663	56.25%	0	0.00%
1968	43,630	49.32%	31,576	35.70%	13,254	14.98%
1972	65,155	65.67%	33,633	33.90%	430	0.43%
1976	61,784	53.85%	51,103	44.54%	1,840	1.60%
1980	69,310	57.44%	41,975	34.79%	9,373	7.77%
1984	78,684	63.25%	45,193	36.33%	520	0.42%
1988	73,129	59.10%	49,816	40.26%	786	0.64%
1992	58,337	38.35%	59,633	39.20%	34,153	22.45%
1996	62,506	42.15%	69,354	46.76%	16,444	11.09%
2000	95,828	50.00%	90,902	47.43%	4,940	2.58%
2004	130,728	52.37%	117,172	46.94%	1,709	0.68%
2008	122,597	42.69%	160,406	55.86%	4,178	1.45%
2012	128,969	46.36%	144,229	51.85%	4,967	1.79%
2016	132,720	43.63%	151,927	49.94%	19,579	6.44%
2020	155,116	44.80%	183,915	53.11%	7,235	2.09%
2024	157,672	47.93%	162,874	49.52%	8,391	2.55%

== Education ==
- Governors State University is a 6,000-student public university in University Park.
- Lewis University is a 5,200-student four-year private university in Romeoville.
- University of St. Francis is a 3,300-student four-year private university in Joliet.
- The county is in Community College District 525 and is served by Joliet Junior College in Joliet. Joliet Junior College was the first two-year higher education institution in the United States.

=== K-12 school districts ===
K-12 school districts, including any with any territory in Will County, no matter how slight, even if the schools and/or administrative headquarters are in other counties:

K-12:

- Beecher Community Unit School District 200U
- Coal City Community Unit School District 1
- Crete Monee Community Unit School District 201U
- Indian Prairie School District 204
- Manteno Community Unit School District 5
- Naperville Community Unit School District 203
- Oswego Community Unit School District 308
- Peotone Community Unit School District 207U
- Plainfield School District 202
- Reed Custer Community Unit School District 255U
- Valley View Community Unit School District 365U
- Wilmington Community Unit School District 209U

Secondary:

- Bloom Township High School District 206
- Joliet Township High School District 204
- Lincoln Way Community High School District 210
- Lockport Township High School District 205
- Minooka Community High School District 111

Elementary:

- Chaney-Monge School District 88
- Channahon School District 17
- Elwood Community Consolidated School District 203
- Fairmont School District 89
- Frankfort Community Consolidated School District 157C
- Homer Community Consolidated School District 33C
- Joliet Public Schools District 86
- Laraway Community Consolidated School District 70C
- Lockport School District 91
- Manhattan School District 114
- Minooka Community Consolidated School District 201
- Mokena School District 159
- New Lenox School District 122
- Richland School District 88A
- Rockdale School District 84
- Steger School District 194;
- Summit Hill School District 161
- Taft School District 90
- Troy Community Consolidated School District 30C
- Union School District 81
- Will County School District 92

== Transportation ==
Will County is served by four U.S. interstate highways, four U.S. highways, and 12 Illinois highways. Pace provides bus transit services within the county.

=== Rail ===
Four different Metra commuter rail lines (Metra Electric Main Line, SouthWest Service, Rock Island District, and Heritage Corridor) connect Will County with the Chicago Loop. Amtrak serves the county at Joliet Transportation Center. The Lincoln Service operates between Chicago and St. Louis, while the Texas Eagle provides service from Chicago south to San Antonio and west to Los Angeles.

=== Major highways ===
- I-55
- I-57
- I-80
- I-355
- US 6
- US 30
- US 45
- US 52
- IL 1
- IL 7
- IL 43
- IL 50
- IL 53
- IL 59
- IL 102
- IL 113
- IL 126
- IL 129
- IL 171
- IL 394

== Energy infrastructure ==
=== Pipelines ===
Will County is a major hub in the national natural gas pipeline grid where pipelines from Canada and the Gulf of Mexico meet and then fan out to serve the Midwest. The following major energy companies own pipeline that runs through Will County:

- Alliance Pipeline
- Enbridge
- Integrys Energy Group
  - Peoples Gas
- Kinder Morgan Interstate Gas Transmission
- TransCanada
  - ANR Pipeline - Fully owned & operated
  - Northern Border Pipeline - Partially owned & fully operated
- Vector Pipeline

=== Joliet Refinery ===
ExxonMobil owns and operates the Joliet Refinery along the Des Plaines River just east of I-55. According to ExxonMobil, the refinery employs about 600 people and was constructed in 1972.

== Municipalities ==
=== Cities ===
- Aurora (mostly in DuPage, Kane, and Kendall counties)
- Braidwood
- Crest Hill
- Joliet (partly in Kendall County)
- Lockport
- Naperville (mostly in DuPage County)
- Wilmington

=== Villages ===
- Beecher
- Bolingbrook (small part in DuPage County)
- Channahon (partly in Grundy County)
- Coal City (mostly in Grundy County)
- Crete
- Diamond (mostly in Grundy County)
- Elwood
- Frankfort (partly in Cook County)
- Godley
- Homer Glen (partly in Cook County)
- Lemont (mostly in Cook County)
- Manhattan
- Minooka (mostly in Grundy & Kendall counties)
- Mokena
- Monee
- New Lenox
- Orland Park (mostly in Cook County)
- Oswego (mostly in Kendall County)
- Park Forest (mostly in Cook County)
- Peotone
- Plainfield (partly in Kendall County)
- Rockdale
- Romeoville
- Shorewood
- Steger (partly in Cook County)
- Symerton
- Tinley Park (mostly in Cook County)
- University Park (partly in Cook County)
- Woodridge (mostly in DuPage County)

=== Census-designated places ===
- Andres
- Arbury Hills
- Bonnie Brae
- Crystal Lawns
- Custer Park
- Eagle Lake
- Fairmont
- Frankfort Square
- Goodenow
- Ingalls Park
- Lakewood Shores
- Lockport Heights
- Lorenzo
- Marley
- Plum Valley
- Preston Heights
- Rest Haven
- Ridgewood
- Ritchie
- Sunnyland
- Willowbrook
- Wilton Center

=== Fort ===
- Beggs

=== Unincorporated communities ===
- Wilton

=== Townships ===
- Channahon
- Crete
- Custer
- DuPage
- Florence
- Frankfort
- Green Garden
- Homer
- Jackson
- Joliet
- Lockport
- Manhattan
- Monee
- New Lenox
- Peotone
- Plainfield
- Reed
- Troy
- Washington
- Wesley
- Wheatland
- Will
- Wilmington
- Wilton
