= Florence Township, Will County, Illinois =

Coordinates: 41°20′11″N 88°04′19″W

Florence Township
- Township
- Location in Will County
- Country: United States
- State: Illinois
- County: Will
- Established: Unknown

Area
  - Total: 36.46 sq mi (94.4 km^{2})
  - Land: 36.43 sq mi (94.4 km^{2})
  - Water: 0.02 sq mi (0.052 km^{2}) 0.05%

Population (2010)
  - Estimate (2016): 936
  - Density: 25.6/sq mi (9.9/km^{2})
- Time zone: UTC-6 (CST)
  - Summer (DST): UTC-5 (CDT)
- FIPS code: 17-197-26519

Florence Township is located in Will County, Illinois. As of the 2010 census, its population was 933 and it contained 370 housing units. Florence Township was formed from a portion of Wilmington Township at an unknown date.

== Geography ==
According to the 2010 census, the township has a total area of 36.46 square miles (94.4 km^{2}), of which 36.43 square miles (94.4 km^{2}) (or 99.92%) is land and 0.02 square miles (0.052 km^{2}) (or 0.05%) is water.

== Demographics ==
Historical population
Census	Pop.	Note	%±
2016 (est.)	936
U.S. Decennial Census
