= Jackson Township, Will County, Illinois =

Coordinates: 41°25′41″N 88°04′40″W

Jackson Township
- Township
- Location in Will County
- Country: United States
- State: Illinois
- County: Will
- Established: November 6, 1849

Area
  - Total: 37.47 sq mi (97.05 km^{2})
  - Land: 37.46 sq mi (97.03 km^{2})
  - Water: 0.0077 sq mi (0.02 km^{2}) 0.02%

Population (2020)
  - Total: 3,898
  - Density: 104/sq mi (40.2/km^{2})
- Time zone: UTC-6 (CST)
  - Summer (DST): UTC-5 (CDT)
- FIPS code: 17-197-38076

Jackson Township is in Will County, Illinois. As of the 2020 census, its population was 3,898 and it contained 1,595 housing units.

== Geography ==
According to the 2020 census, the township has a total area of 37.47 square miles (97.05 km^{2}), of which 37.46 square miles (97.03 km^{2}) (or 99.98%) is land and 0.01 square miles (0.02 km^{2}) (or 0.02%) is water.

== Demographics ==
Historical population
Census	Pop.	Note	%±
2000	3,532		—
2010	4,094		15.9%
2020	3,898		−4.8%
U.S. Decennial Census
