= Sunnyland, Illinois =

- Unincorporated community Census designated place
- Location within Illinois Location within the United States
- Coordinates: 41°34′19″N 88°8′41″W
- Country: United States
- State: Illinois
- County: Will
- Townships: Plainfield; Lockport

Area
  - Total: 0.20 sq mi (0.51 km^{2})
  - Land: 0.20 sq mi (0.51 km^{2})
  - Water: 0 sq mi (0.00 km^{2})
- Elevation: 620 ft (190 m)

Population (2020)
  - Total: 822
  - Density: 4,137.2/sq mi (1,597.39/km^{2})
- Time zone: UTC-6 (Central (CST))
  - Summer (DST): UTC-5 (CDT)
- ZIP Code: 60435 (Joliet)
- Area codes: 815, 779
- FIPS code: 17-73872
- GNIS feature ID: 2806567

Sunnyland is an unincorporated community and census-designated place (CDP) in Will County, Illinois, United States. As of the 2020 census, Sunnyland had a population of 822. It is in the northwest part of the county and is bordered to the west by Joliet and to the south and east by Crest Hill. It sits on the north side of U.S. Route 30, which leads southeast 5 miles (8 km) to downtown Joliet and northwest 1.5 miles (2.4 km) to Interstate 55.

Sunnyland was first listed as a CDP prior to the 2020 census.

== Demographics ==
Historical population
Census	Pop.	Note	%±
2020	822		—
U.S. Decennial Census

Sunnyland first appeared as a census designated place in the 2020 U.S. census.

=== 2020 census ===
Sunnyland CDP, Illinois – Racial and ethnic composition Note: the US Census treats Hispanic/Latino as an ethnic category. This table excludes Latinos from the racial categories and assigns them to a separate category. Hispanics/Latinos may be of any race.
Race / Ethnicity (NH = Non-Hispanic)	Pop 2020	% 2020
White alone (NH)	486	59.12%
Black or African American alone (NH)	18	2.19%
Native American or Alaska Native alone (NH)	5	0.61%
Asian alone (NH)	19	2.31%
Native Hawaiian or Pacific Islander alone (NH)	0	0.00%
Other race alone (NH)	4	0.49%
Mixed race or Multiracial (NH)	54	6.57%
Hispanic or Latino (any race)	236	28.71%
Total	822	100.00%
