= Andres, Illinois =

Andres
- Unincorporated community Census designated place
- Location of Andres within Illinois Andres (the United States)
- Coordinates: 41°22′18″N 87°52′57″W
- Country: United States
- State: Illinois
- County: Will

Area
  - Total: 0.12 sq mi (0.31 km^{2})
  - Land: 0.12 sq mi (0.31 km^{2})
  - Water: 0 sq mi (0.00 km^{2})
- Elevation: 722 ft (220 m)

Population (2020)
  - Total: 43
  - Density: 360.9/sq mi (139.34/km^{2})
- Time zone: UTC-6 (CST)
  - Summer (DST): UTC-5 (CDT)
- Zip: 60400
- Area codes: 815, 779
- FIPS code: 17-01517

Andres is an unincorporated community and census designated place (CDP) in Will County, Illinois, United States. It is located south of Frankfort and west of Peotone on U.S. Route 45. As of the 2020 census, Andres had a population of 43.

== Community information ==
Andres has a population of less than 50 people. There is no library or any city services. It has many older buildings. There are no city streets. The Chicago, Milwaukee, and Gary Railroad, a subsidiary of the Chicago, Milwaukee, St. Paul & Pacific Railroad, used to pass through on its route from Momence to Joliet.

== Education ==
Andres is part of Peotone Community School District 207-U.

== Geography ==
Andres is located about 40 miles (64 km) away from Chicago. Andres is surrounded by farms.

== Demographics ==
Historical population
Census	Pop.	Note	%±
2020	43		—
U.S. Decennial Census; 2020

Andres first appeared as a census designated place in the 2020 U.S. census.

Andres CDP, Illinois – Racial and ethnic composition Note: the US Census treats Hispanic/Latino as an ethnic category. This table excludes Latinos from the racial categories and assigns them to a separate category. Hispanics/Latinos may be of any race.
Race / Ethnicity (NH = Non-Hispanic)	Pop 2020	% 2020
White alone (NH)	33	76.74%
Black or African American alone (NH)	0	0.00%
Native American or Alaska Native alone (NH)	0	0.00%
Asian alone (NH)	0	0.00%
Native Hawaiian or Pacific Islander alone (NH)	0	0.00%
Other race alone (NH)	0	0.00%
Mixed race or Multiracial (NH)	5	11.63%
Hispanic or Latino (any race)	5	11.63%
Total	43	100.00%
