= Manteno Community Unit School District 5 =

School district in Northeastern Illinois, United States

Address
- 84 North Oak Street Manteno, Illinois, 60950; United States

District information
- Type: Public
- Grades: PreK–12
- NCES District ID: 1724390

Students and staff
- Students: 1,945

Other information
- Website: www.manteno5.org

Manteno Community Unit School District 5 serves the area of Manteno, and the Townships of Rockville, Sumner, Bourbonnais, and a portion of Wesley Township, Will County. Manteno Community School District is 153 square miles (400 km^{2}). Prior to the creation of Community Unit District 5 in 1954, the schools in Manteno served primarily Village of Manteno and neighboring residents, while smaller rural places like Deselm and Indian Oaks had their own schools, often one-room schoolhouses.

The school district today consists of three schools: Manteno Elementary School, Manteno Middle School, and Manteno Community High School.

== Manteno Elementary School ==
Originally the Elementary School was called the Primary School, and it taught grades 1-8. It was situated on South Walnut Street, across from the Presbyterian Church. As Manteno grew after World War II and the "baby boom" increased Manteno's population, a new high school was built in 1954 to replace the "old high school" that had been built in 1926. The old high school then became a "second campus" for the primary school, serving grades 4-6. The old primary school then served just grades 1-3. At the same time, a new "junior high school" was created for grades 7-8, and it was co-located in the new high school building. By 2001, as Manteno's population continued to grow, a new elementary school was built and opened, so the old primary school building was transformed to become the headquarters of the Village's fire department.

== Manteno Middle School ==
In 1954, Manteno built a new high school, which housed grades 7-12. When that happened, grades 4-6 moved into the old high school building, which was built in 1926. But 20 years later, as Manteno continued to grow, the decision was made to build another new high school, which opened in 1974. At that point, the combined junior and senior high school building became solely the junior high school building, which today is called Manteno Middle School. Instead of just grades 7-8, it teaches grade 5-8, and it is called a Middle School, in line with current US educational practice.

The old Middle School building was torn down in 2013. Manteno continued to grow, so additions to the Middle School building were made in 1994 and 2007, including 18 more classrooms and a new gym. The building went under renovation, too.

== Manteno Community High School ==
Manteno's first high school building on North Maple Street served as the high school from 1926-1954. In 1954 a new high school building opened on Park Street to house both the junior and senior high schools. So the old high school building on Maple Street became the second campus of Manteno's Primary School, serving grades 4-6. The 1926 building was torn down in 2013, after 97 years. 

Over time, the 1954 high school building became too small for Manteno's population growth, so village residents voted to build a new high school building, which opened in 1974. The new high school was built for 300 students. In 2003 Manteno Community High School put an 8 classroom addition as well as a second gym and a new greenhouse and a new sports complex. In 2006 when voters approved a referendum, Manteno Community High School added 28 classrooms, more commons space, and a new office and parking lot for the staff. The current high school can now hold 1,350 students. As of 2025, there were approximately 700 students enrolled.

=== Future Expansion ===
In preparation for future growth of its population, the Manteno School District bought 180 acres (0.73 km^{2}) of land west of Manteno. In the meantime, the Manteno School District has continued to make renovations on all present standing schools.

=== Athletics ===
Manteno Community High School is a member of the IHSA and a member of the Interstate Eight Conference.

==== Achievements ====
- 1977,1978 Boys Cross Country State Finalist
- 1982 Girls Volleyball, Regional Champions, Sectional Champions
- 1984 Girls Volleyball, Regional Champions, Sectional Champions, Class A Elite Eight
- 1985 Girls Softball, Regional Champions
- 1987 Girls Volleyball, Regional Champions, Sectional Champions, Class A Elite Eight
- 1988 Girls Volleyball, Regional Champions, Sectional Champions, Class A Elite Eight
- 1989 Girls Volleyball, Regional Champions, Sectional Champions, Class A Elite Eight
- 1989 Girls Track & Field Sectional Champions, 3rd in the State
- 1990 Boys Golf State Finalist
- 1990 Girls Basketball, Regional Champions
- 1991 Girls Basketball, Regional Champions, Sectional Runner-Up
- 1995 Girls Softball, Regional Champions
- 1996 Girls Softball, Regional Champions
- 1997 Boys Soccer, Regional Champions, Sectional Champions, State Finalist
- 1997 Girls Softball, Regional Champions
- 2004 Girls Soccer, Regional Champions, Sectional Runner-Up
- 2004 Girls Softball, Regional Champions, Sectional Runner-Up
- 2005 Boys Golf, Regional Champions, Sectional Champions, 4th in the State
- 2006 Boys Basketball, Regional Champions
- 2006 Girls Softball, Regional Champions
- 2006 Boys Baseball, Regional Champions, Sectional Runner-Up
- 2007 Girls Softball, Regional Champions
- 2007 Boys Soccer, Sectional Champions, Class A Elite Eight
- 2009 Girls Soccer, Regional Champions, Sectional Champions, Class 1A State Champions
- 2009 Girls Volleyball, Regional Champions
- 2010 Girls Soccer, Regional Champions, Sectional Champions, Class 1A State Runner Up 2nd in the State
- 2011 Wrestling, Regional Champions
- 2012 Wrestling, Regional Champions
- 2012 Girls Soccer, Regional Champions, Sectional Champions, Class 1A State Runner Up 2nd in the State
- 2013 Girls Soccer, Regional Champions, Sectional Champions, Class 1A Elite Eight
- 2014 Girls Soccer, Regional Champions, Sectional Champions, Supersectional Champions, Class 1A State Champions
- 2015 Football, I-8 Large Conference Champions, Class 4A, Quarter final Playoff team.
- 2024 Boys Basketball, Regional Champions

==== Athletics Offered ====
- Baseball (Spring)
- Basketball (Winter)
- Cheerleading (Fall and Winter)
- Cross Country (Fall)
- Football (Fall)
- Golf (Fall)
- Soccer (Boys Fall, Girls Spring)
- Softball (Spring)
- Track and Field (Spring)
- Volleyball (Fall)
- Wrestling (Winter)
- Chess (Fall)

=== FFA ===
Manteno Community High School has an outstanding FFA program. In 2008 Manteno FFA Chapter will celebrate its 70th anniversary. Manteno FFA has a state of the art greenhouse. Manteno FFA was voted one of the top FFA Chapters in the State of Illinois. Manteno High School has had an Agriculture program since 1938.
