= Eagle Lake, Illinois =

- Unincorporated community Census designated place
- Location within Illinois Location within the United States
- Coordinates: 41°22′2″N 87°33′15″W
- Country: United States
- State: Illinois
- County: Will
- Township: Washington

Area
  - Total: 0.60 sq mi (1.56 km^{2})
  - Land: 0.60 sq mi (1.56 km^{2})
  - Water: 0 sq mi (0.00 km^{2})
- Elevation: 730 ft (220 m)

Population (2020)
  - Total: 76
  - Density: 126.4/sq mi (48.79/km^{2})
- Time zone: UTC-6 (Central (CST))
  - Summer (DST): UTC-5 (CDT)
- ZIP Code: 60401 (Beecher)
- Area codes: 815, 779
- FIPS code: 17-21475
- GNIS feature ID: 2806475

Eagle Lake is an unincorporated community and census-designated place (CDP) in Will County, Illinois, United States. It is near the southeast corner of the county, in the northeast corner of Washington Township. It is 5 miles (8 km) northeast of Beecher and 1.5 miles (2.4 km) west of the Indiana state line.

As of the 2020 census, Eagle Lake had a population of 76.

Eagle Lake was first listed as a CDP prior to the 2020 census.

== Demographics ==
Historical population
Census	Pop.	Note	%±
2020	76		—
U.S. Decennial Census

Eagle Lake first appeared as a census designated place in the 2020 U.S. census.

=== 2020 census ===
Eagle Lake CDP, Illinois – Racial and ethnic composition Note: the US Census treats Hispanic/Latino as an ethnic category. This table excludes Latinos from the racial categories and assigns them to a separate category. Hispanics/Latinos may be of any race.
Race / Ethnicity (NH = Non-Hispanic)	Pop 2020	% 2020
White alone (NH)	62	81.58%
Black or African American alone (NH)	3	3.95%
Native American or Alaska Native alone (NH)	0	0.00%
Asian alone (NH)	2	2.63%
Native Hawaiian or Pacific Islander alone (NH)	0	0.00%
Other race alone (NH)	0	0.00%
Mixed race or Multiracial (NH)	3	3.95%
Hispanic or Latino (any race)	6	7.89%
Total	76	100.00%
