= Wesley Township, Illinois =

Coordinates: 41°15′20″N 88°04′10″W

Wesley Township
- Township
- Location in Will County
- Country: United States
- State: Illinois
- County: Will
- Established: 1846

Government
  - Supervisor: Mike Medlin

Area
  - Total: 28.52 sq mi (73.9 km^{2})
  - Land: 27.85 sq mi (72.1 km^{2})
  - Water: 0.67 sq mi (1.7 km^{2}) 2.35%

Population (2010)
  - Estimate (2016): 2,223
  - Density: 80.5/sq mi (31.1/km^{2})
- Time zone: UTC-6 (CST)
  - Summer (DST): UTC-5 (CDT)
- FIPS code: 17-197-79865

Wesley Township is located in Will County, Illinois. As of the 2010 census, its population was 2,241 and it contained 891 housing units. Wesley Township was formed from the south-eastern part of Wilmington Township in 1846. It contains the census-designated places of Ballou, Rest Haven, and Ritchie. Wesley, Illinois was the setting for a murder in the 1966 mystery fiction book "Deadline" by Thomas B. Dewey.

== School districts ==
- Wilmington Community School District 209-U
- Manteno Community Unit School District 5

== Geography ==
According to the 2010 census, the township has a total area of 28.52 square miles (73.9 km^{2}), of which 27.85 square miles (72.1 km^{2}) (or 97.65%) is land and 0.67 square miles (1.7 km^{2}) (or 2.35%) is water.

== Demographics ==
Historical population
Census	Pop.	Note	%±
2016 (est.)	2,223
U.S. Decennial Census
