= Plum Valley, Illinois =

- Unincorporated community Census designated place
- Location within Illinois Location within the United States
- Coordinates: 41°27′39″N 87°32′46″W
- Country: United States
- State: Illinois
- County: Will
- Township: Crete

Area
  - Total: 1.87 sq mi (4.84 km^{2})
  - Land: 1.87 sq mi (4.84 km^{2})
  - Water: 0 sq mi (0.00 km^{2})
- Elevation: 675 ft (206 m)

Population (2020)
  - Total: 632
  - Density: 338.4/sq mi (130.66/km^{2})
- Time zone: UTC-6 (Central (CST))
  - Summer (DST): UTC-5 (CDT)
- ZIP Code: 60417 (Crete)
- Area codes: 815, 779
- FIPS code: 17-60826
- GNIS feature ID: 2806545

Plum Valley is a suburban unincorporated community and census-designated place (CDP) in Will County, Illinois, United States. It is in the northeast corner of the county, bordered to the north by Cook County and to the east by Lake County, Indiana. To the south is unincorporated Willow Brook Estates. Plum Creek flows from southwest to northeast through the center of the CDP.

Plum Valley was first listed as a CDP prior to the 2020 census. As of the 2020 census, Plum Valley had a population of 632.

== Demographics ==
Historical population
Census	Pop.	Note	%±
2020	632		—
U.S. Decennial Census

Plum Valley first appeared as a census designated place in the 2020 U.S. census.

=== 2020 census ===
Plum Valley CDP, Illinois – Racial and ethnic composition Note: the US Census treats Hispanic/Latino as an ethnic category. This table excludes Latinos from the racial categories and assigns them to a separate category. Hispanics/Latinos may be of any race.
Race / Ethnicity (NH = Non-Hispanic)	Pop 2020	% 2020
White alone (NH)	294	46.52%
Black or African American alone (NH)	223	35.28%
Native American or Alaska Native alone (NH)	2	0.32%
Asian alone (NH)	1	0.16%
Native Hawaiian or Pacific Islander alone (NH)	0	0.00%
Other race alone (NH)	0	0.00%
Mixed race or Multiracial (NH)	26	4.11%
Hispanic or Latino (any race)	86	13.61%
Total	632	100.00%
