= Will Township, Illinois =

Coordinates: 41°19′58″N 87°43′14″W

Will Township
- Township
- Location in Will County
- Country: United States
- State: Illinois
- County: Will
- Established: 1859

Government
  - Supervisor: Brian Cann

Area
  - Total: 36.22 sq mi (93.8 km^{2})
  - Land: 36.2 sq mi (94 km^{2})
  - Water: 0.01 sq mi (0.026 km^{2}) 0.03%

Population (2020 United States Census)
  - Total: 1,794
  - Density: 49.8/sq mi (19.2/km^{2})
- Time zone: UTC-6 (CST)
  - Summer (DST): UTC-5 (CDT)
- FIPS code: 17-197-81711

Will Township is located in Will County, Illinois. As of the 2020 census, the population of Will Township was 1794. Will Township was formed from the former township of Carey, which included modern day Monee Township and Will Township, in January 1859.

== Schools ==
The eastern 1/3 of Will Township lies within the boundaries of the Beecher Unit School District 200U. The western 2/3 of the township belongs to the Peotone Unit School District 207U. Crawford Ave. is the dividing line between the two districts.

== Township Headquarters ==
The Will Township town hall and road district garage are located on the southeast corner of Beecher-Peotone Road and Will Center Road. A former one room schoolhouse makes up part of the Will Township town hall. The road district garage sits on the same property just south of the Township hall. A yard for storage of gravel, equipment and unused material is a few hundred feet south of the road district garage. Between the garage and the yard is a corncrib that the township also owns and uses for storage. The polling place for Will Township residents is the Peotone Library, located within the village of Peotone. Past polling places for Will Township residents include the Will Township town hall and Bult Field Airport.

== Geography ==
Very gently rolling farmland makes up the majority of Will Township. Since the area was settled agriculture has been the main industry in Will Township. The fertile soil has allowed many generations of families to make a living from the land. Corn, soybean, hay, and wheat fields make up the farm landscape. According to the 2010 census, the township has a total area of 36.22 square miles (93.8 km^{2}), of which 36.2 square miles (94 km^{2}) (or 99.94%) is land and 0.01 square miles (0.026 km^{2}) (or 0.03%) is water.

Black Walnut Creek, Rock Creek, Marshall Slough and the Exline Slough are the main bodies of water that run through Will Township. These creeks provide drainage for the farmland. Old atlases show Walnut Creek as being a natural stream. Some areas have been straightened over the years to make farming operations more efficient or to follow property lines. The other creeks are generally figured to be mostly man made drainage ditches following the natural lay of the land.

== Demographics ==
Historical population
Census	Pop.	Note	%±
2016 (est.)	1,809
U.S. Decennial Census

== History ==
The Township of Will did not have a single tree in its entire 36 square miles (93 km^{2}) when settlers began arriving in Will County. For this reason Will Township was settled later than some of the surrounding townships that provided timber.

The first settler was John McKenzie, a Scotchman, in 1852. He moved to Missouri a few years later. Crete native John M. Gridley descended upon the township in 1853 and erected the second cabin there. He had tried living several places in Will County, but after 13 years of searching he found a place which he was fond of. He would go down as one of the most prominent men the township ever had. At the organization of Will Township in 1859, Gridley was elected one of the highway commissioners. He remained in Will Township until his death in 1904.

By the time the township was formed in 1859 many good men had become residents. Soon after the townships formation it was divided into three school districts. By the mid 1860s, the township would be dotted with school houses that would provide for the upbringing and education of the townships children.

After 1860 the township filled up rapidly and little unoccupied land was to be found anywhere in its boundaries. The Will County Plat Atlas, 1862 shows some of the land in Will Township was still owned by the Illinois Central Railroad. It has been reported that the railroad sold land east of Peotone, to early settlers, for $2.50 to $5.00 per acre. Not all sections of the township were owned by the railroad. Early settlers acquired some of the land from the federal government via the Homestead Act. The fertile soil of Will Township would serve its farming inhabitants for generations to come.

By 1900 the population of the township was 860. The township has always heavily favored the Republican party. There were 212 votes cast in 1900, 150 of those being Republican and 62 being Democrat.

== Soil Types ==
Elliot and Ashkum soils are the most common soil types found in Will Township. These soil types are ideal for growing crops such as corn, soybeans, and wheat. Other common soil types found within the Township of Will are Beecher, Pella, Varna, Jasper, Markham, Brenton, and Proctor. These loam soils are all well suited for agricultural purposes. Generally as you move south the productivity of the soil improves modestly.

== Land ==
The majority of township land is still owned by farmers or retired farmers. Because of the townships close proximity to the Chicago metropolitan area the townships farmland has been disappearing and split up into 5 or 10-acre (40,000 m^{2}) country lots. Country living combined with the access of the Chicago job market makes Will Township and attractive place for people to buy a lot and build a single family home. In many instances these homeowners will ask a nearby farmer to farm the back 5 acres (20,000 m^{2}) or 7 acres (28,000 m^{2}) of their parcel.

The 1873 Will County Landowners Atlas describes the landscape of Will Township at the time: The township has no timber, and is considered one of the finest prairie towns in the state.

In the modern day Will Township land is used predominantly for farming purposes. Most years corn and soybeans are planted on about the same area throughout the township. Wheat is also planted on a fair area. According to satellite photos taken in May 2015, 720 acres of the township is used for the purpose of growing hay or forage. 70 acres (280,000 m^{2}) served as cattle pasture in 2007. 580 acres (2.3 km^{2}) in the northern half of the township is planted in dense trees.

== Infrastructure ==
The Illinois Central railroad runs through the northwestern part of Will Township. It began operation in 1856. Today it runs from Chicago to Louisiana with many branches along the way.

Interstate 57 runs through the northwest corner of Will Township. Illinois Route 50 runs adjacent to a railroad on the west side of the township. These two roads are the most traveled roads in the township. Beecher-Peotone Road, also known as Beecher Blacktop, is also a main road that runs east to west through the middle of the township. Intersecting with Beecher-Peotone Road is Will Center Road, also a highly traveled route.

Bult Field is a small airport in Will Township. Formerly known as Sanger Airport, Bult Field is located on Kedzie Avenue, between Offner Rd. and Eagle Lake Road. The State of Illinois recently purchased the airport as part of its plan to eventually build the larger South Suburban Airport.

Many underground pipelines, carrying mostly petroleum or natural gas products, also cross the township. Aqua Illinois has a water line located in the township which carries water from the Kankakee River to University Park, IL. A branch comes off the line and runs to the village of Peotone to supply the village residents with drinking water.

The majority of the township roads are either tar and chip or gravel. These roads are well maintained by the township and provide travel for all township residents.

== Township Roads ==
Will Township has the responsibility of maintaining about 50 miles (80 km) of township road and right of way. Will Township roads are made up of gravel or tar and chip. The township currently has one and a half miles of asphalt road as well. Asphalt roads can be found on Kedzie Ave. between Eagle Lake Rd. and Offner Rd. and the stretch of North Peotone Rd. between Route 50 and Harlem Ave. There are no dirt roads remaining in the township.

The Crooked Bridge is a well known location to residents across the region. Located at the corner of Egyptian Trail and Church Road, the Crooked Bridge is a one of a kind bride that crosses Black Walnut Creek.

Other roads not previously mentioned that run through Will Township are Ridgeland Ave., Crawford Ave., Western Ave., Corning Ave., and Kennedy Rd.

== Issues ==
Since the 1980s there has been talk of the State of Illinois building a third Chicago area airport on the fertile farmland of Will Township. The majority of Will Township residents strongly oppose the Illinois Department of Transportation buying or taking land from area landowners for an airport that has not yet been approved by the Federal Aviation Administration.
