= DuPage Township, Illinois =

DuPage Township
- Township
- Location in Will County
- Coordinates: 41°41′02″N 88°05′16″W
- Country: United States
- State: Illinois
- County: Will
- Established: November 6, 1849

Area
  - Total: 36.77 sq mi (95.2 km^{2})
  - Land: 36.26 sq mi (93.9 km^{2})
  - Water: 0.5 sq mi (1.3 km^{2}) 1.36%
- Elevation: 686 ft (209 m)

Population (2010)
  - Estimate (2016): 88,762
  - Density: 2,420.9/sq mi (934.7/km^{2})
- Time zone: UTC-6 (CST)
  - Summer (DST): UTC-5 (CDT)
- FIPS code: 17-197-21241

DuPage Township is located in Will County, Illinois. As of the 2010 census, its population was 87,793 and it contained 28,861 housing units making it the most populous township in the county. Like the county of the same name which it borders on the north, this township is named after the DuPage River.

== Geography ==
According to the 2010 census, the township has a total area of 36.77 square miles (95.2 km^{2}), of which 36.26 square miles (93.9 km^{2}) (or 98.61%) is land and 0.5 square miles (1.3 km^{2}) (or 1.36%) is water.

=== Cities, Towns, Villages ===
- Bolingbrook (vast majority)
- Lemont (small portion)
- Lockport (small portion)
- Naperville (southeast quarter)
- Plainfield (small portion)
- Romeoville (half)
- Woodridge (small portion)

=== Unincorporated Towns ===
- Barbers Corners at 41.710886°N 88.068719°W
- Romeo at 41.640586°N 88.058395°W
- Welco Corners at 41.697254°N 88.041451°W

=== Lakes ===
- Brenden's Lake
- Lake Staffeldt
- Whalon Lake

== Demographics ==
Historical population
| Census | Pop. | Note | %± |
|---|---|---|---|
| 2016 (est.) | 88,762 |
U.S. Decennial Census
