= Marley, Illinois =

- Unincorporated community Census designated place
- Location within Illinois Location within the United States
- Coordinates: 41°32′56″N 87°55′32″W
- Country: United States
- State: Illinois
- County: Will
- Township: New Lenox

Area
  - Total: 0.10 sq mi (0.27 km^{2})
  - Land: 0.10 sq mi (0.27 km^{2})
  - Water: 0 sq mi (0.00 km^{2})
- Elevation: 690 ft (210 m)

Population (2020)
  - Total: 128
  - Density: 1,220.9/sq mi (471.41/km^{2})
- Time zone: UTC-6 (Central (CST))
  - Summer (DST): UTC-5 (CDT)
- ZIP Code: 60448 (Mokena)
- Area codes: 815, 779
- FIPS code: 17-47046
- GNIS feature ID: 2806524

Marley is an unincorporated community and census-designated place (CDP) in Will County, Illinois, United States. It is in the northern part of the county, between Homer Glen to the north and Mokena to the south. Marley is bordered to the south by Interstate 80, but with no direct access. U.S. Route 6 (Southwest Highway) passes just north of Marley, leading west-southwest 9 miles (14 km) to Joliet and northeast 6 miles (10 km) to Orland Park.

Marley was first listed as a CDP prior to the 2020 census. As of the 2020 census, Marley had a population of 128.

== Demographics ==
Historical population
Census	Pop.	Note	%±
2020	128		—
U.S. Decennial Census

Marley first appeared as a census designated place in the 2020 U.S. census.

=== 2020 census ===
Marley CDP, Illinois – Racial and ethnic composition Note: the US Census treats Hispanic/Latino as an ethnic category. This table excludes Latinos from the racial categories and assigns them to a separate category. Hispanics/Latinos may be of any race.
Race / Ethnicity (NH = Non-Hispanic)	Pop 2020	% 2020
White alone (NH)	120	93.75%
Black or African American alone (NH)	0	0.00%
Native American or Alaska Native alone (NH)	0	0.00%
Asian alone (NH)	0	0.00%
Native Hawaiian or Pacific Islander alone (NH)	0	0.00%
Other race alone (NH)	0	0.00%
Mixed race or Multiracial (NH)	5	3.91%
Hispanic or Latino (any race)	3	2.34%
Total	128	100.00%

== Education ==
It is in the New Lenox School District 122 and the Lincoln Way Community High School District 210.
