= Bonnie Brae, Illinois =

- Unincorporated community Census designated place
- Location within Illinois Location within the United States
- Coordinates: 41°35′59″N 88°2′4″W
- Country: United States
- State: Illinois
- County: Will
- Township: Lockport

Area
  - Total: 0.19 sq mi (0.49 km^{2})
  - Land: 0.19 sq mi (0.49 km^{2})
  - Water: 0 sq mi (0.00 km^{2})
- Elevation: 670 ft (200 m)

Population (2020)
  - Total: 1,287
  - Density: 6,748.0/sq mi (2,605.41/km^{2})
- Time zone: UTC-6 (Central (CST))
  - Summer (DST): UTC-5 (CDT)
- ZIP Code: 60441 (Lockport)
- Area codes: 815, 779
- FIPS code: 17-07276
- GNIS feature ID: 2806458

Bonnie Brae is an unincorporated community and census-designated place (CDP) in Will County, Illinois, United States. It is in the northern part of the county and is bordered to the north, east, and south by the city of Lockport. It is 2 miles (3 km) northeast of the center of Lockport and 7 miles (11 km) north-northeast of Joliet.

As of the 2020 census, Bonnie Brae had a population of 1,287.

Bonnie Brae was first listed as a CDP prior to the 2020 census.

Pace provides bus service on Route 832 connecting Bonnie Brae to downtown Lockport and other destinations.

== Demographics ==
Historical population
Census	Pop.	Note	%±
2020	1,287		—
U.S. Decennial Census

Bonnie Brae first appeared as a census designated place in the 2020 U.S. census.

=== 2020 census ===
As of the 2020 census, Bonnie Brae had a population of 1,287 and 496 households. The median age was 36.3 years. 21.8% of residents were under the age of 18, and 11.2% were age 65 or older. For every 100 females, there were 93.2 males, and for every 100 females age 18 and over, there were 88.2 males.

100.0% of residents lived in urban areas, while 0.0% lived in rural areas.

Of all households, 29.8% had children under the age of 18 living in them. Married-couple households made up 40.7% of households, while 23.4% had a male householder with no spouse or partner present and 23.2% had a female householder with no spouse or partner present. Individuals made up 23.2% of all households, and 10.8% had someone living alone who was 65 years of age or older.

There were 506 housing units, of which 2.0% were vacant. The homeowner vacancy rate was 0.9%, and the rental vacancy rate was 0.0%.

Bonnie Brae CDP, Illinois – Racial and ethnic composition Note: the US Census treats Hispanic/Latino as an ethnic category. This table excludes Latinos from the racial categories and assigns them to a separate category. Hispanics/Latinos may be of any race.
Race / Ethnicity (NH = Non-Hispanic)	Pop 2020	% 2020
White alone (NH)	960	74.59%
Black or African American alone (NH)	13	1.01%
Native American or Alaska Native alone (NH)	4	0.31%
Asian alone (NH)	13	1.01%
Native Hawaiian or Pacific Islander alone (NH)	0	0.00%
Other race alone (NH)	6	0.47%
Mixed race or Multiracial (NH)	83	6.45%
Hispanic or Latino (any race)	208	16.16%
Total	1,287	100.00%

== Education ==
It is in the Will County School District 92 and the Lockport Township High School District 205.
