= Washington Township, Will County, Illinois =

Coordinates: 41°20′32″N 87°36′05″W

Washington Township
- Township
- Location in Will County
- Country: United States
- State: Illinois
- County: Will
- Established: Unknown

Area
  - Total: 44.72 sq mi (115.8 km^{2})
  - Land: 44.71 sq mi (115.8 km^{2})
  - Water: 0 sq mi (0 km^{2}) 0%

Population (2010)
  - Estimate (2016): 6,332
  - Density: 140.1/sq mi (54.1/km^{2})
- Time zone: UTC-6 (CST)
  - Summer (DST): UTC-5 (CDT)
- FIPS code: 17-197-79059
- Website: www.washingtontownshipil.com

Washington Township is located in Will County, Illinois. As of the 2010 census, its population was 6,263 and it contained 2,404 housing units. Washington Township was formed from Crete Township and Sherburn Township on an unknown date.

== Bodies of water ==
Eagle Lake is a small lake owned by the Beecher Sportsmen's Club on Yates Avenue. Its maximum depth is about 18 feet (5.5 m). The lake was a much larger marshy area when settlers first moved to the area. Most of the lake was eventually drained to make the land suitable for agricultural purposes. Many small creeks run through the township, including Trim Creek and Pike Creek, which drain into the Kankakee River, and Plum Creek, which drains into the Calumet River and eventually Lake Michigan.

== The land ==
The land to the north, east, south, and west of Beecher is mostly made up of corn, soybean, and the occasional wheat field. Even as the majority of the land is used for farming, the soil is not considered "great." The Eagle Lake Region, in the far northeast corner of the township, is somewhat marshy with some clay, which is not ideal for above average crop yields.

The farm land is generally more fertile on the west and south sides of the township

== Towns ==
Beecher is a rural town with a population of approximately 2,900. Beecher is located in the middle of Washington Township. This small, rural village sprouted up along a railroad like so many other little towns across the Midwest. Although still considered small, Beecher has grown a lot recently. Within the last six or seven years it has seen a population increase close to 1,000 with the construction of several new housing developments on the northeast side of town.

Located in the northeast region of the township is the unincorporated village of Eagle Lake. Known most for the Beecher Sportsmen's Club, Eagle Lake is a happy little village of only about 25 people. A beautiful little, white country church, St. John's Lutheran, sits on a hill about 3/4 of a mile up the road to the north. In the late 1800s a post office existed for a short time at Eagle Lake.

== Geography ==
According to the 2010 census, the township has a total area of 44.72 square miles (115.8 km^{2}), all land.

== Demographics ==
Historical population
Census	Pop.	Note	%±
2016 (est.)	6,332
U.S. Decennial Census
