= Lorenzo, Illinois =

- Unincorporated community Census designated place
- Location within Illinois Location within the United States
- Coordinates: 41°20′49″N 88°13′19″W
- Country: United States
- State: Illinois
- County: Will
- Township: Wilmington

Area
  - Total: 0.31 sq mi (0.80 km^{2})
  - Land: 0.31 sq mi (0.80 km^{2})
  - Water: 0 sq mi (0.00 km^{2})
- Elevation: 532 ft (162 m)

Population (2020)
  - Total: 26
  - Density: 84.0/sq mi (32.45/km^{2})
- Time zone: UTC-6 (Central (CST))
  - Summer (DST): UTC-5 (CDT)
- ZIP Code: 60481 (Wilmington)
- Area codes: 815, 779
- FIPS code: 17-44784
- GNIS feature ID: 2806522

Lorenzo is an unincorporated community and census-designated place (CDP) in Will County, Illinois, United States. It is in the southwest part of the county, in the valley of the Kankakee River. Interstate 55 passes 1 mile (1.6 km) to the east, and the city of Wilmington is 6 miles (10 km) to the southeast.

Lorenzo was first listed as a CDP prior to the 2020 census. As of the 2020 census, Lorenzo had a population of 26.

== Demographics ==
Historical population
Census	Pop.	Note	%±
2020	26		—
U.S. Decennial Census

Lorenzo first appeared as a census designated place in the 2020 U.S. census.

=== 2020 census ===
Lorenzo CDP, Illinois – Racial and ethnic composition Note: the US Census treats Hispanic/Latino as an ethnic category. This table excludes Latinos from the racial categories and assigns them to a separate category. Hispanics/Latinos may be of any race.
Race / Ethnicity (NH = Non-Hispanic)	Pop 2020	% 2020
White alone (NH)	25	96.15%
Black or African American alone (NH)	0	0.00%
Native American or Alaska Native alone (NH)	0	0.00%
Asian alone (NH)	0	0.00%
Native Hawaiian or Pacific Islander alone (NH)	0	0.00%
Other race alone (NH)	1	3.85%
Mixed race or Multiracial (NH)	0	0.00%
Hispanic or Latino (any race)	0	0.00%
Total	26	100.00%

== Education ==
It is in the Wilmington Community Unit School District 209U.
