= Goodenow, Illinois =

- Unincorporated community Census designated place
- Location within Illinois Location within the United States
- Coordinates: 41°23′29″N 87°38′12″W
- Country: United States
- State: Illinois
- County: Will

Area
  - Total: 0.031 sq mi (0.08 km^{2})
  - Land: 0.031 sq mi (0.08 km^{2})
  - Water: 0 sq mi (0.00 km^{2})
- Elevation: 745 ft (227 m)

Population (2020)
  - Total: 60
  - Density: 1,856.1/sq mi (716.64/km^{2})
- Time zone: UTC-6 (Central (CST))
  - Summer (DST): UTC-5 (CDT)
- Area code: 708
- GNIS feature ID: 409147

Goodenow is an unincorporated community and census designated place (CDP) in Will County, Illinois, United States. As of the 2020 census, Goodenow had a population of 60.

== History ==
First surveyed in 1839, 160 acres (65 ha) were purchased in 1853 by George Goodenow. Divided into "blocks, lots, streets and alleys" in 1872. It is in a semi-rural area with the closest town being Crete to the north and Beecher to the south. It is very wooded and contains remnant Oak trees and prairie grass with many houses on large, wooded lots. The major industry was the now-closed Beecher Landfill which took in garbage from the Chicago metropolitan area. Will Township Unity. To the east of the area is the 700-acre (2.8 km^{2}) Goodenow Grove Nature Preserve. To the south, it is open farmlands for several miles until you get to the town of Beecher. The town lies on the Valparaiso Moraine and the small stream, Plum Creek, runs through the area.

== Demographics ==
Historical population
Census	Pop.	Note	%±
2020	60		—
U.S. Decennial Census

Goodenow first appeared as a census designated place in the 2020 U.S. census.

=== 2020 census ===
Goodenow CDP, Illinois – Racial and ethnic composition Note: the US Census treats Hispanic/Latino as an ethnic category. This table excludes Latinos from the racial categories and assigns them to a separate category. Hispanics/Latinos may be of any race.
Race / Ethnicity (NH = Non-Hispanic)	Pop 2020	% 2020
White alone (NH)	55	91.67%
Black or African American alone (NH)	0	0.00%
Native American or Alaska Native alone (NH)	0	0.00%
Asian alone (NH)	0	0.00%
Native Hawaiian or Pacific Islander alone (NH)	0	0.00%
Other race alone (NH)	0	0.00%
Mixed race or Multiracial (NH)	2	3.33%
Hispanic or Latino (any race)	3	5.00%
Total	60	100.00%
