= Manhattan Township, Illinois =

Coordinates: 41°25′57″N 87°57′14″W

Manhattan Township
- Township
- Location in Will County
- Country: United States
- State: Illinois
- County: Will
- Established: Unknown

Area
  - Total: 36.85 sq mi (95.4 km^{2})
  - Land: 36.85 sq mi (95.4 km^{2})
  - Water: 0 sq mi (0 km^{2}) 0%

Population (2010)
  - Estimate (2016): 9,705
  - Density: 250.1/sq mi (96.6/km^{2})
- Time zone: UTC-6 (CST)
  - Summer (DST): UTC-5 (CDT)
- FIPS code: 17-197-46370
- Website: https://manhattantownship.com/

Manhattan Township is located in Will County, Illinois. It was established in 1853. As of the 2010 census, its population was 9,218 and it contained 3,199 housing units. Manhattan Township was formed from the western half of Trenton Township at an unknown date.

The Village of Manhattan is in the township boundaries, as is a portion of the Village of New Lenox.

== Geography ==
According to the 2010 census, the township has a total area of 36.85 square miles (95.4 km^{2}), all land.

== Demographics ==
Historical population
Census	Pop.	Note	%±
2016 (est.)	9,705
U.S. Decennial Census

== Education ==
Much of the township is in the Manhattan School District 114 and the Lincoln Way Community High School District 210. A southeastern portion is in a K-12 school district, Peotone Community Unit School District 207U.
