= Ritchie, Illinois =

Ritchie
- Unincorporated community Census designated place
- Location of Ritchie within Illinois Ritchie (the United States)
- Coordinates: 41°15′18″N 88°06′19″W
- Country: United States
- State: Illinois
- County: Will
- Township: Wesley
- Elevation: 561 ft (171 m)
- Time zone: UTC-6 (CST)
  - Summer (DST): UTC-5 (CDT)
- Postal code: 60481
- Area codes: 815, 779

Ritchie is an unincorporated community and census designated place (CDP) in southern Will County, Illinois, United States. It is located along Forked Creek and Illinois Route 102, three miles southeast of the city of Wilmington in Wesley Township. As of the 2020 census, Ritchie had a population of 190.

Ritchie is home to several dozen houses, the Wesley Township hall, a church, a grain elevator, and the house of the founder of Ritchie. His house is located at the eastern entry into Ritchie along Illinois Route 102. A railroad track passing through the community was dismantled in the 1990s, but the bridge that carried it over Forked Creek and Route 102 remains. Ritchie was founded by the Leasure's, Butler's and Warriner families. There used to be a museum of the families but it burned down.

== Demographics ==
Historical population
Census	Pop.	Note	%±
2020	190		—
U.S. Decennial Census

Ritchie first appeared as a census designated place in the 2020 U.S. census.

=== 2020 census ===
Ritchie CDP, Illinois – Racial and ethnic composition Note: the US Census treats Hispanic/Latino as an ethnic category. This table excludes Latinos from the racial categories and assigns them to a separate category. Hispanics/Latinos may be of any race.
Race / Ethnicity (NH = Non-Hispanic)	Pop 2020	% 2020
White alone (NH)	168	88.42%
Black or African American alone (NH)	0	0.00%
Native American or Alaska Native alone (NH)	0	0.00%
Asian alone (NH)	3	1.58%
Native Hawaiian or Pacific Islander alone (NH)	0	0.00%
Other race alone (NH)	0	0.00%
Mixed race or Multiracial (NH)	4	2.11%
Hispanic or Latino (any race)	15	7.89%
Total	190	100.00%

== Education ==
It is in the Wilmington Community Unit School District 209U.
