= Reed Township, Illinois =

Coordinates: 41°14′37″N 88°13′01″W

Reed Township
- Township
- Location in Will County
- Country: United States
- State: Illinois
- County: Will
- Established: June 10, 1850

Area
  - Total: 18.04 sq mi (46.7 km^{2})
  - Land: 17.24 sq mi (44.7 km^{2})
  - Water: 0.8 sq mi (2.1 km^{2}) 4.43%

Population (2010)
  - Estimate (2016): 6,976
  - Density: 403.1/sq mi (155.6/km^{2})
- Time zone: UTC-6 (CST)
  - Summer (DST): UTC-5 (CDT)
- FIPS code: 17-197-63108
- Website: reedtownship.us

Reed Township is located in Will County, Illinois. As of the 2010 census, its population was 6,948 and it contained 3,259 housing units. Reed Township was originally named Clinton Township, but was changed on June 10, 1850.

== Geography ==
According to the 2010 census, the township has a total area of 18.04 square miles (46.7 km^{2}), of which 17.24 square miles (44.7 km^{2}) (or 95.57%) is land and 0.8 square miles (2.1 km^{2}) (or 4.43%) is water.

== Demographics ==
Historical population
Census	Pop.	Note	%±
2016 (est.)	6,976
U.S. Decennial Census
