= Lakewood Shores, Illinois =

Lakewood Shores
- Unincorporated community Census designated place
- Location in Will County and the state of Illinois.
- Coordinates: 41°16′3″N 88°8′9″W
- Country: United States
- State: Illinois
- County: Will

Area
  - Total: 0.43 sq mi (1.11 km^{2})
  - Land: 0.35 sq mi (0.90 km^{2})
  - Water: 0.081 sq mi (0.21 km^{2})
- Elevation: 564 ft (172 m)

Population (2020)
  - Total: 665
  - Density: 1,911.5/sq mi (738.05/km^{2})
- Time zone: UTC-6 (CST)
  - Summer (DST): UTC-5 (CDT)
- Area codes: 815, 779
- FIPS code: 17-41716

Lakewood Shores is an unincorporated community and census-designated place (CDP) in Will County, Illinois, United States. The population was 665 at the 2020 census.

== Geography ==
Lakewood Shores is located at 41°16′3″N 88°8′9″W (41.267397, -88.135792).

According to the United States Census Bureau, the CDP has a total area of 2.7 square miles (7.0 km^{2}), of which 2.3 square miles (6.0 km^{2}) is land and 0.4 square miles (1.0 km^{2}) (15.33%) is water.

== Demographics ==
Historical population
Census	Pop.	Note	%±
2010	1,347		—
2020	665		−50.6%
U.S. Decennial Census

As of the census of 2000, there were 1,487 people, 517 households, and 402 families living in the CDP. The population density was 640.7 inhabitants per square mile (247.4/km^{2}). There were 557 housing units at an average density of 240.0 per square mile (92.7/km^{2}). The racial makeup of the CDP was 97.51% White, 0.07% African American, 1.08% Native American, 0.27% Asian, 0.54% from other races, and 0.54% from two or more races. Hispanic or Latino of any race were 2.15% of the population.

There were 517 households, out of which 39.7% had children under the age of 18 living with them, 65.8% were married couples living together, 6.0% had a female householder with no husband present, and 22.1% were non-families. 17.2% of all households were made up of individuals, and 4.4% had someone living alone who was 65 years of age or older. The average household size was 2.88 and the average family size was 3.27.

In the CDP, the population was spread out, with 29.2% under the age of 18, 6.9% from 18 to 24, 32.1% from 25 to 44, 23.6% from 45 to 64, and 8.2% who were 65 years of age or older. The median age was 36 years. For every 100 females, there were 112.7 males. For every 100 females age 18 and over, there were 111.4 males.

The median income for a household in the CDP was $52,097, and the median income for a family was $58,409. Males had a median income of $37,434 versus $26,152 for females. The per capita income for the CDP was $18,414. About 1.9% of families and 2.6% of the population were below the poverty line, including 3.5% of those under age 18 and none of those age 65 or over.

== Education ==
It is in the Wilmington Community Unit School District 209U.
