= Lockport Heights, Illinois =

Census-designated place in Illinois, US

- Unincorporated community Census designated place
- Location within Illinois Location within the United States
- Coordinates: 41°37′17″N 88°1′20″W
- Country: United States
- State: Illinois
- County: Will
- Townships: Homer; Lockport

Area
  - Total: 0.17 sq mi (0.45 km^{2})
  - Land: 0.17 sq mi (0.45 km^{2})
  - Water: 0 sq mi (0.00 km^{2})
- Elevation: 740 ft (230 m)

Population (2020)
  - Total: 749
  - Density: 4,342.3/sq mi (1,676.56/km^{2})
- Time zone: UTC-6 (Central (CST))
  - Summer (DST): UTC-5 (CDT)
- ZIP Code: 60441 (Lockport)
- Area codes: 815, 779
- FIPS code: 17-44244
- GNIS feature ID: 2806521

Lockport Heights is an unincorporated community and census-designated place (CDP) in Will County, Illinois, United States. As of the 2020 census, Lockport Heights had a population of 749. It is in the northern part of the county and is bordered to the west, south, and east by the city of Lockport. Illinois Route 171 (Archer Avenue) runs along the northwest side of the CDP, leading southwest 3 miles (5 km) to the center of Lockport and northeast 17 miles (27 km) to the western edge of Chicago.

Lockport Heights was first listed as a CDP prior to the 2020 census.

== Demographics ==
Historical population
Census	Pop.	Note	%±
2020	749		—
U.S. Decennial Census

Lockport Heights first appeared as a census designated place in the 2020 U.S. census.

=== 2020 census ===
Lockport Heights CDP, Illinois – Racial and ethnic composition Note: the US Census treats Hispanic/Latino as an ethnic category. This table excludes Latinos from the racial categories and assigns them to a separate category. Hispanics/Latinos may be of any race.
Race / Ethnicity (NH = Non-Hispanic)	Pop 2020	% 2020
White alone (NH)	642	85.71%
Black or African American alone (NH)	2	0.27%
Native American or Alaska Native alone (NH)	2	0.27%
Asian alone (NH)	2	0.27%
Native Hawaiian or Pacific Islander alone (NH)	0	0.00%
Other race alone (NH)	9	1.20%
Mixed race or Multiracial (NH)	43	5.74%
Hispanic or Latino (any race)	49	6.54%
Total	749	100.00%

== Education ==
It is in the Will County School District 92 and the Lockport Township High School District 205.
