= Custer Park, Illinois =

- Unincorporated community Census designated place
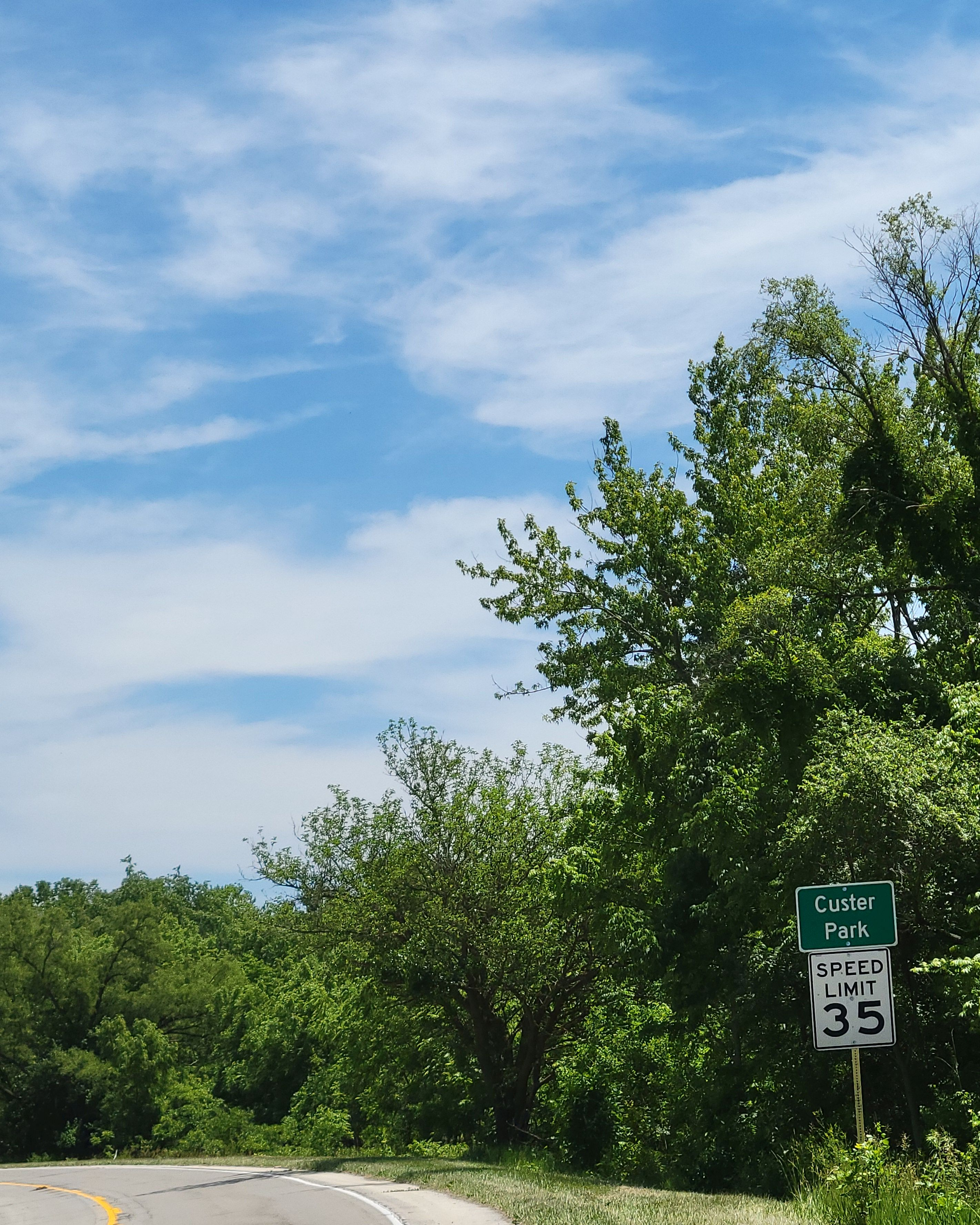
- Custer Park sign on Illinois Route 113

- Location within Illinois Location within the United States
- Coordinates: 41°14′43″N 88°07′48″W
- Country: United States
- State: Illinois
- County: Will

Area
  - Total: 0.19 sq mi (0.48 km^{2})
  - Land: 0.16 sq mi (0.41 km^{2})
  - Water: 0.027 sq mi (0.07 km^{2})
- Elevation: 561 ft (171 m)

Population (2020)
  - Total: 112
  - Density: 711/sq mi (274.7/km^{2})
- Time zone: UTC-6 (Central (CST))
  - Summer (DST): UTC-5 (CDT)
- Area codes: 815 & 779
- FIPS code: 17-18212
- GNIS feature ID: 406909

Custer Park is an unincorporated community and census designated place (CDP) in Will County, Illinois, United States. Custer Park is located on Illinois Route 113 and the south bank of the Kankakee River 4.5 miles (7.2 km) east-southeast of Braidwood.

As of the 2020 census, Custer Park had a population of 112.

== Demographics ==
Historical population
Census	Pop.	Note	%±
2020	112		—
U.S. Decennial Census

Custer Park first appeared as a census designated place in the 2020 U.S. census.

=== 2020 census ===
Custer Park CDP, Illinois – Racial and ethnic composition Note: the US Census treats Hispanic/Latino as an ethnic category. This table excludes Latinos from the racial categories and assigns them to a separate category. Hispanics/Latinos may be of any race.
Race / Ethnicity (NH = Non-Hispanic)	Pop 2020	% 2020
White alone (NH)	94	83.93%
Black or African American alone (NH)	0	0.00%
Native American or Alaska Native alone (NH)	0	0.00%
Asian alone (NH)	0	0.00%
Native Hawaiian or Pacific Islander alone (NH)	0	0.00%
Other race alone (NH)	0	0.00%
Mixed race or Multiracial (NH)	4	3.57%
Hispanic or Latino (any race)	14	12.50%
Total	112	100.00%

== Education ==
It is in the Reed Custer Community Unit School District 255U.
