= Arbury Hills, Illinois =

- Unincorporated community Census designated place
- Location within Illinois Location within the United States
- Coordinates: 41°32′08″N 87°50′51″W
- Country: United States
- State: Illinois
- County: Will

Area
  - Total: 0.18 sq mi (0.46 km^{2})
  - Land: 0.18 sq mi (0.46 km^{2})
  - Water: 0 sq mi (0.00 km^{2})
- Elevation: 722 ft (220 m)

Population (2020)
  - Total: 1,132
  - Density: 6,314.1/sq mi (2,437.88/km^{2})
- Time zone: UTC-6 (Central (CST))
  - Summer (DST): UTC-5 (CDT)
- Area codes: 815 & 779
- FIPS code: 17-01803
- GNIS feature ID: 403587

Arbury Hills is an unincorporated community and census designated place (CDP) in Will County, Illinois, United States. As of the 2020 census, Arbury Hills had a population of 1,132.

== Demographics ==
Historical population
| Census | Pop. | Note | %± |
|---|---|---|---|
| 2020 | 1,132 | | — |
U.S. Decennial Census

Arbury Hills first appeared as a census designated place in the 2020 U.S. census.

=== 2020 census ===
As of the 2020 census, Arbury Hills had a population of 1,132. The median age was 38.4 years. 22.2% of residents were under the age of 18 and 12.8% of residents were 65 years of age or older. For every 100 females there were 100.4 males, and for every 100 females age 18 and over there were 98.0 males age 18 and over.

100.0% of residents lived in urban areas, while 0.0% lived in rural areas.

There were 401 households in Arbury Hills, of which 32.9% had children under the age of 18 living in them. Of all households, 54.4% were married-couple households, 14.5% were households with a male householder and no spouse or partner present, and 21.2% were households with a female householder and no spouse or partner present. About 18.7% of all households were made up of individuals and 6.5% had someone living alone who was 65 years of age or older.

There were 421 housing units, of which 4.8% were vacant. The homeowner vacancy rate was 2.2% and the rental vacancy rate was 2.5%.

Arbury Hills CDP, Illinois – Racial and ethnic composition Note: the US Census treats Hispanic/Latino as an ethnic category. This table excludes Latinos from the racial categories and assigns them to a separate category. Hispanics/Latinos may be of any race.
| Race / Ethnicity (NH = Non-Hispanic) | Pop 2020 | % 2020 |
|---|---|---|
| White alone (NH) | 916 | 80.92% |
| Black or African American alone (NH) | 9 | 0.80% |
| Native American or Alaska Native alone (NH) | 4 | 0.35% |
| Asian alone (NH) | 16 | 1.41% |
| Native Hawaiian or Pacific Islander alone (NH) | 0 | 0.00% |
| Other race alone (NH) | 0 | 0.00% |
| Mixed race or Multiracial (NH) | 51 | 4.51% |
| Hispanic or Latino (any race) | 136 | 12.01% |
| Total | 1,132 | 100.00% |

== Education ==
It is in the Summit Hill School District 161 and the Lincoln Way Community High School District 210.
