= Wilmington Township, Illinois =

Coordinates: 41°20′01″N 88°11′20″W

Wilmington Township
- Township
- Location in Will County
- Country: United States
- State: Illinois
- County: Will
- Established: November 6, 1849

Area
  - Total: 35.95 sq mi (93.1 km^{2})
  - Land: 33.02 sq mi (85.5 km^{2})
  - Water: 2.92 sq mi (7.6 km^{2}) 8.12%

Population (2010)
  - Estimate (2016): 6,151
  - Density: 187.5/sq mi (72.4/km^{2})
- Time zone: UTC-6 (CST)
  - Summer (DST): UTC-5 (CDT)
- FIPS code: 17-197-82114

Wilmington Township is located in Will County, Illinois, United States. As of the 2010 census, its population was 6,193 and it contained 2,811 housing units. It contains the census-designated place of Lorenzo.

== Geography ==
According to the 2010 census, the township has a total area of 35.95 square miles (93.1 km^{2}), of which 33.02 square miles (85.5 km^{2}) (or 91.85%) is land and 2.92 square miles (7.6 km^{2}) (or 8.12%) is water.

== Demographics ==
Historical population
Census	Pop.	Note	%±
2016 (est.)	6,151
U.S. Decennial Census
