= New Lenox Township, Illinois =

New Lenox Township
- Township
- Flag Seal

- Location in Will County
- Country: United States
- State: Illinois
- County: Will
- Named for: Lenox, New York
- Established: June 10, 1850

Government
  - Supervisor: Cass Wennlund

Area
  - Total: 35.94 sq mi (93.1 km^{2})
  - Land: 35.86 sq mi (92.9 km^{2})
  - Water: 0.08 sq mi (0.21 km^{2}) 0.22%

Population (2010)
  - Estimate (2016): 42,172
  - Density: 1,122.8/sq mi (433.5/km^{2})
- Time zone: UTC-6 (CST)
  - Summer (DST): UTC-5 (CDT)
- FIPS code: 17-197-52597
- Website: http://www.newlenox.org

New Lenox Township is located in the heart of Will County, Illinois, on U.S. Route 30 and Interstate 80. As of the 2010 census, its population was 40,270, and it contained 13,721 housing units. New Lenox Township has thirty-six square miles within its jurisdiction. It serves almost all of the Village of New Lenox and parts of the individual municipalities of Mokena, Homer Glen, Joliet and the entire unincorporated areas of the New Lenox community. New Lenox Township changed its name from Vernon Township on June 10, 1850.

New Lenox Township provides the fair and equal assessment of all real estate in the Township, and road, bridge and storm water system maintenance outside the municipalities. New Lenox Township also provides environmental programs, mosquito abatement, transit services, senior housing, family, senior and youth service programs, a food pantry for New Lenox Township residents in need, general assistance to needy families in New Lenox Township, and the administration, maintenance and preservation of the local Marshall and Maplewood Cemeteries.

== Current officials ==
- Cass Wennlund - Supervisor
- Mark Munizzo- Assessor
- Mike Potocki-Road Commissioner
- Phil Juarez - Collector
- Martin Boban - Trustee
- Steve Friant - Trustee
- Patty Deiters - Trustee
- Anette Vogt - Trustee
- Lynn Eckhardt - Clerk

== Geography ==
According to the 2010 census, the township has a total area of 35.94 square miles (93.1 km^{2}), of which 35.86 square miles (92.9 km^{2}) (or 99.78%) is land and 0.08 square miles (0.21 km^{2}) (or 0.22%) is water.

=== Cities, towns, villages ===
- Homer Glen (small portion)
- Joliet (small portion)
- Mokena (small portion)
- New Lenox (vast majority)

=== Other Communities ===
- Brisbane at 41.492531°N 87.957832°W
- Gilletts at 41.517475°N 87.936994°W
- Marley at 41.548641°N 87.925606°W
- Spencer at 41.498089°N 87.941719°W

== Demographics ==
Historical population
Census	Pop.	Note	%±
2016 (est.)	42,172
U.S. Decennial Census
