= Crystal Lawns, Illinois =

Census designated place

Crystal Lawns
- Unincorporated community Census designated place
- Location in Will County and the state of Illinois.
- Coordinates: 41°34′10″N 88°9′22″W
- Country: United States
- State: Illinois
- County: Will

Area
  - Total: 0.66 sq mi (1.71 km^{2})
  - Land: 0.66 sq mi (1.71 km^{2})
  - Water: 0 sq mi (0.00 km^{2})
- Elevation: 604 ft (184 m)

Population (2020)
  - Total: 1,830
  - Density: 2,772/sq mi (1,070.3/km^{2})
- Time zone: UTC-6 (CST)
  - Summer (DST): UTC-5 (CDT)
- Area codes: 815, 779
- FIPS code: 17-17939

Crystal Lawns is an unincorporated community and census-designated place (CDP) in Will County, Illinois, United States. The population was 1,830 at the 2020 census.

== Geography ==
Crystal Lawns is located near the northwest corner of the city of Joliet, just southeast of the Westfield Louis Joliet shopping mall. Its geographic coordinates are 41°34′10″N 88°9′22″W (41.569580, -88.156203). A golf course used to be on the land of Crystal Lawns, and the old clubhouse still stands in a decayed state. According to the United States Census Bureau, the CDP has a total area of 1.0 square mile (2.6 km^{2}), all land. There is also an elementary school called Crystal Lawns Elementary School off of Crystal Drive. It is part of Plainfield School District 202.

== Demographics ==
Historical population
Census	Pop.	Note	%±
2020	1,830		—
U.S. Decennial Census

=== 2020 census ===
As of the 2020 census, Crystal Lawns had a population of 1,830. The median age was 40.6 years. 20.0% of residents were under the age of 18 and 17.5% of residents were 65 years of age or older. For every 100 females there were 109.9 males, and for every 100 females age 18 and over there were 109.7 males age 18 and over.

100.0% of residents lived in urban areas, while 0.0% lived in rural areas.

There were 694 households in Crystal Lawns, of which 28.8% had children under the age of 18 living in them. Of all households, 55.5% were married-couple households, 17.7% were households with a male householder and no spouse or partner present, and 19.6% were households with a female householder and no spouse or partner present. About 22.8% of all households were made up of individuals and 12.5% had someone living alone who was 65 years of age or older.

There were 727 housing units, of which 4.5% were vacant. The homeowner vacancy rate was 1.1% and the rental vacancy rate was 1.2%.

Racial composition as of the 2020 census
Race	Number	Percent
White	1,469	80.3%
Black or African American	39	2.1%
American Indian and Alaska Native	15	0.8%
Asian	7	0.4%
Native Hawaiian and Other Pacific Islander	0	0.0%
Some other race	126	6.9%
Two or more races	174	9.5%
Hispanic or Latino (of any race)	335	18.3%

=== 2000 census ===
As of the census of 2000, there were 2,933 people, 1,024 households, and 809 families residing in the CDP. The population density was 2,954.5 inhabitants per square mile (1,140.7/km^{2}). There were 1,044 housing units at an average density of 1,051.7 per square mile (406.1/km^{2}). The racial makeup of the CDP was 95.74% White, 0.65% African American, 0.31% Native American, 0.41% Asian, 1.88% from other races, and 1.02% from two or more races. Hispanic or Latino of any race were 5.93% of the population.

There were 1,024 households, out of which 39.1% had children under the age of 18 living with them, 64.8% were married couples living together, 9.5% had a female householder with no husband present, and 20.9% were non-families. 17.7% of all households were made up of individuals, and 6.7% had someone living alone who was 65 years of age or older. The average household size was 2.86 and the average family size was 3.25.

In the CDP, the population was spread out, with 28.1% under the age of 18, 7.7% from 18 to 24, 29.9% from 25 to 44, 23.8% from 45 to 64, and 10.5% who were 65 years of age or older. The median age was 37 years. For every 100 females, there were 103.3 males. For every 100 females age 18 and over, there were 97.9 males.

The median income for a household in the CDP was $53,750, and the median income for a family was $59,583. Males had a median income of $42,065 versus $30,032 for females. The per capita income for the CDP was $20,369. About 3.7% of families and 6.2% of the population were below the poverty line, including 8.0% of those under age 18 and none of those age 65 or over.

== Transportation ==
Pace provides bus service on Route 507 connecting Crystal Lawns to downtown Joliet and other destinations.

== Education ==
It is in the Plainfield School District 202, a K-12 school district.

Crystal Lawns Elementary School, which covers the old part of Crystal Lawns, feeds into Timber Ridge Middle School and Plainfield Central High School. Grand Prairie Elementary School covers Crystal Lawns Addition, and feeds into the same middle and high school.
