= Joliet, Illinois =

- City
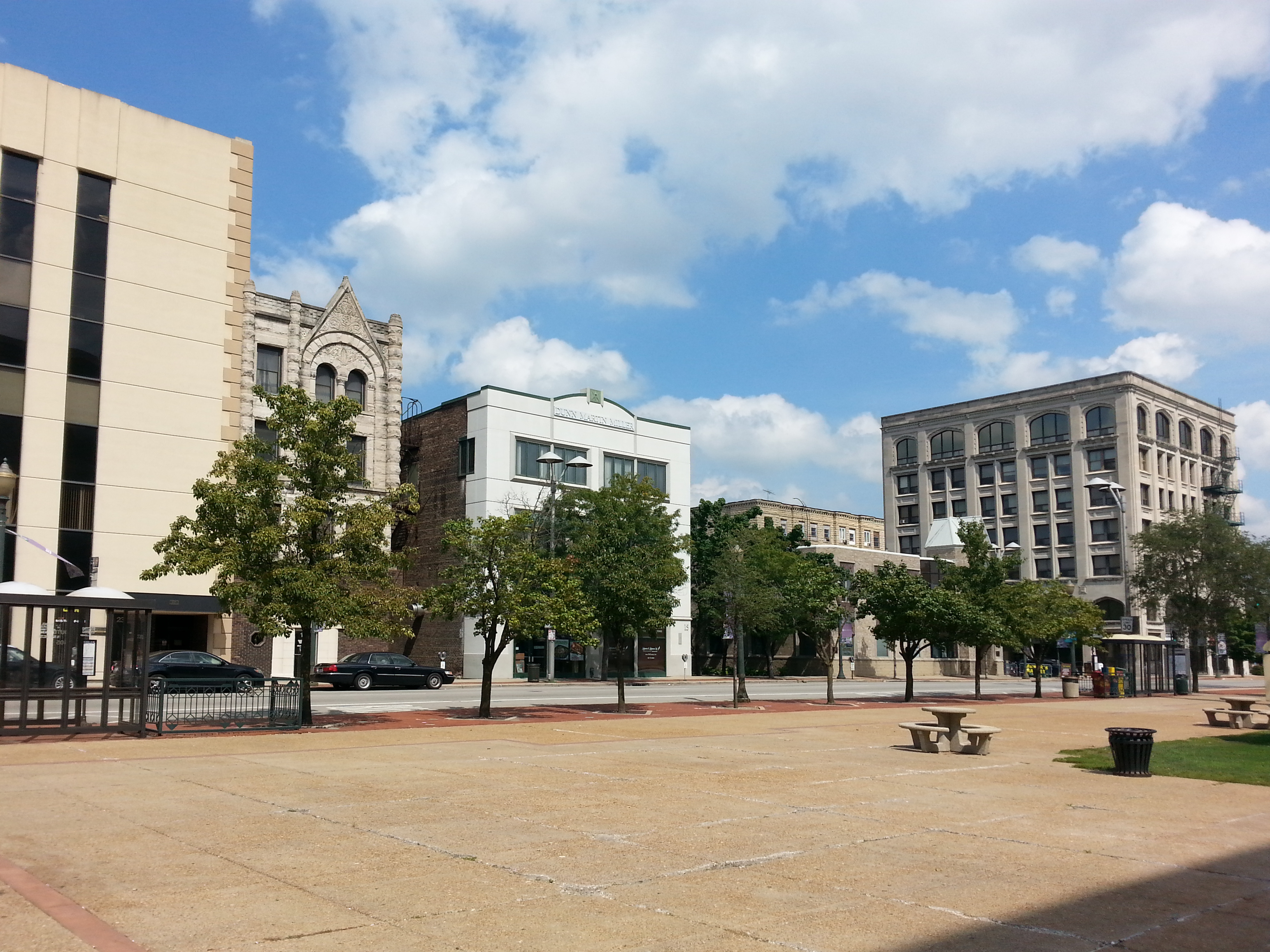
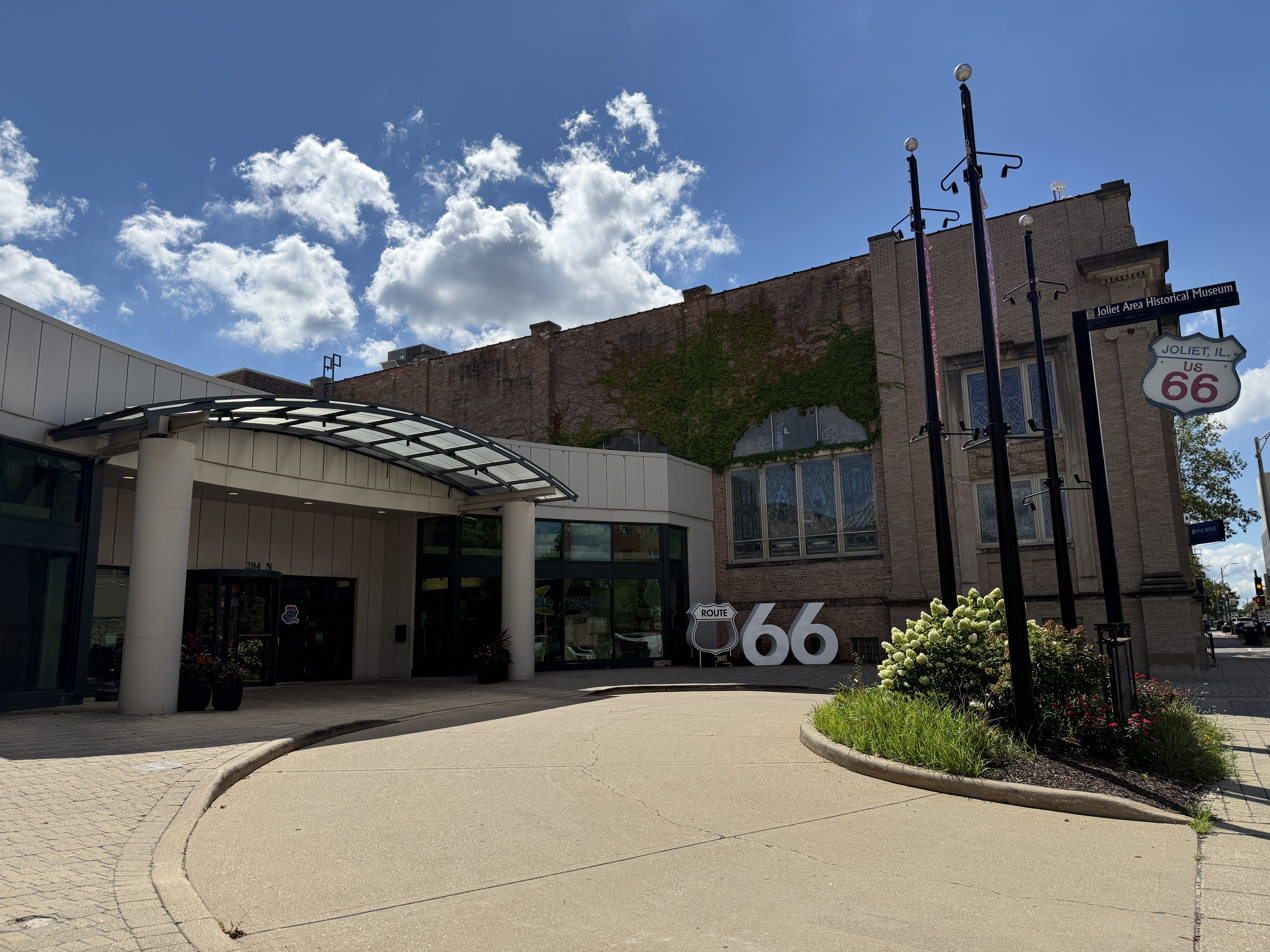
- Downtown Joliet Will County Courthouse Joliet Gateway Center Joliet Area Historical Museum Rialto Square Theatre

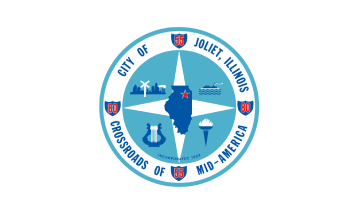
- Flag Seal
- Nickname: "Prison City"
- Motto: Crossroads of Mid-America
- Interactive map of Joliet, Illinois
- Location within Chicago metropolitan area Location within Illinois Location within the United States
- Coordinates: 41°31′47″N 88°04′22″W
- Country: United States
- State: Illinois
- Counties: Will and Kendall
- Townships: Joliet, Troy, Plainfield, Lockport, New Lenox, Jackson, Channahon, Seward, Na-Au-Say
- Settled: 1833
- Incorporated: 1852
- Named for: Louis Jolliet

Government
  - Type: Council–manager
  - Mayor: Terry D'Arcy (Independent)

Area
  - Total: 65.82 sq mi (170.48 km^{2})
  - Land: 65.08 sq mi (168.56 km^{2})
  - Water: 0.74 sq mi (1.92 km^{2})
- Elevation: 610 ft (190 m)

Population (2020)
  - Total: 150,362
  - Estimate (2024): 151,837 ▲
  - Rank: US: 178th
  - Density: 2,310.3/sq mi (892.02/km^{2})
- Time zone: UTC−6 (CST)
  - Summer (DST): UTC−5 (CDT)
- ZIP codes: 60431–60436, 60441, 60586, 60432
- Area codes: 815, 779
- FIPS code: 17-38570
- Airport: Joliet Regional Airport
- GNIS feature ID: 2395477
- Demonym: Jolietan
- Wikimedia Commons: Joliet, Illinois
- Website: www.joliet.gov

Joliet (/ˈdʒoʊliɛt, ˌdʒoʊliˈɛt/ JOH-lee-et, -ET) is a city in Will and Kendall counties in the U.S. state of Illinois. Located 40 miles (64 km) southwest of Chicago, it is the county seat of Will County. Originally settled in 1852 as a steel mill town on the Des Plaines River, Joliet later became known for being the first major city outside of Chicago on U.S. Route 66. It is home to Old Joliet Prison, a historic decommissioned correctional facility that was the largest in the state at the time of its construction. The prison has been featured prominently in several films and television shows, including the 1980 film The Blues Brothers. As of the 2020 census, the population was 150,362, making it the third-most populous city in Illinois.

== History ==
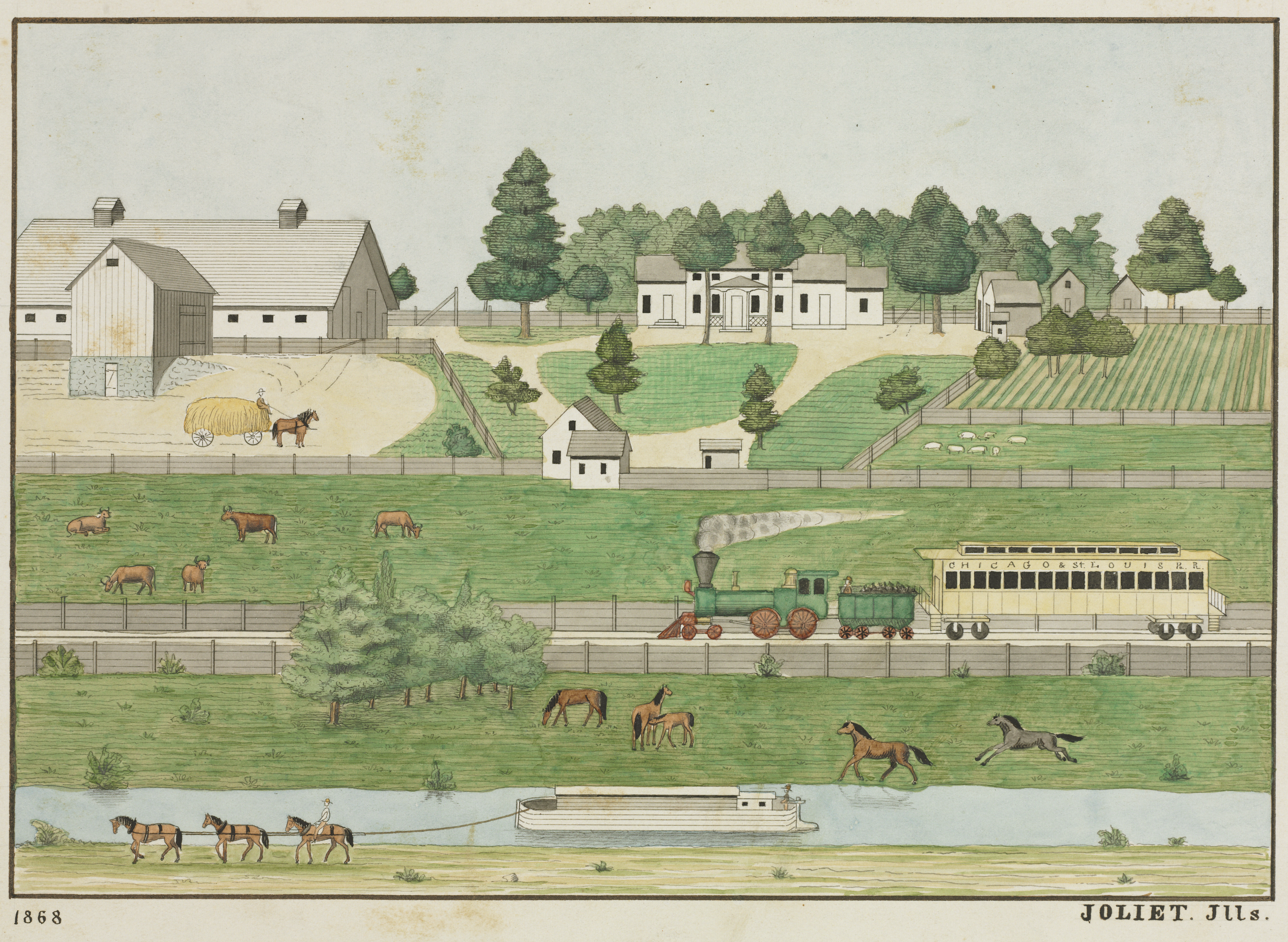
Drawing of Joliet, 1937

In 1673, Louis Jolliet, along with Father Jacques Marquette, paddled up the Des Plaines River and camped on a huge earthwork mound, a few miles south of present-day Joliet. Maps from Jolliet's exploration of the area showed a large hill or mound down river from Chicago, labeled Mont Joliet. The mound has since been flattened due to mining.

In 1833, following the Black Hawk War, Charles Reed built a cabin along the west side of the Des Plaines River. Across the river in 1834, James B. Campbell, treasurer of the canal commissioners, laid out the village of "Juliet", a corruption of "Joliet" that was also in use at the time. Just before the economic depression of 1837, Juliet incorporated as a village, but to cut tax expenses, Juliet residents soon petitioned the state to rescind that incorporation.

In 1845, local residents changed the community's name from "Juliet" to "Joliet", reflecting the original name. Joliet was reincorporated as a city in 1852. Cornelius Covenhoven Van Horne was active in getting the city its first charter, and because of this, he was elected Joliet's first mayor. When the city later built a new bridge, it was named the Van Horne Bridge. Joliet went on to build a system of four more Moveable drawbridges along the river to allow for the passage of large shipping boats.

Joliet Iron and Steel Works was once the second largest steel mill in the United States. Joliet Iron Works was initially run from 1869 to 1936. Joliet Steel Works eventually became unprofitable, and all operations were ceased by the early 1980s. It is now preserved on the U.S. National Register of Historic Places.

Joliet Correctional Center (also known as "Old Joliet Prison") was completed in 1858. The prison was constructed entirely out of local Limestone sourced from Joliet and the nearby village of Romeoville. At the time of its opening, it was the largest state prison in Illinois. The facility closed in 2002, but opened for tours in 2018.

U.S. Route 66 was completed in 1926 and runs directly through Joliet. It crosses the Des Plaines River at Ruby Street Bridge and continues through the downtown area and south of Interstate 80. It runs concurrent with IL-53 and is home to several tourist stops, including the first-ever Dairy Queen location.

Joliet was a prosperous community through the early 1900s until the Great Depression. During the 1930s many residents were no longer financially able to afford the upkeep of their large residences. The Jacob A. Henry Mansion, along with many other properties, became boarding houses. The mansion was later used as a funeral parlor. In the 1940s, when single-family housing became scarce during World War II, large Victorian homes were divided to accommodate multiple families. After the war, absentee landlords and deferred maintenance exacerbated the slowly deteriorating condition of the area. Extensive use of vinyl siding in exterior renovations also played a role in Joliet's decline, altering several historic limestone structures. In 1975, Joliet became eligible for federal financial assistance under the HUD Block Grant Program. The program provided incentives for homeowners and landlords to restore historic structures. Efforts to revitalize Joliet are ongoing, and were aided in part by the establishment of the Joliet East Side Historic District in 1980. The Upper Bluff Historic District was established in 1991. Both neighborhoods are listed in the U.S. National Register of Historic Places.

== Geography ==
According to the 2021 census gazetteer files, Joliet has a total area of 65.82 square miles (170.47 km^{2}), of which 65.08 square miles (168.56 km^{2}) (or 98.87%) is land and 0.74 square miles (1.92 km^{2}) (or 1.13%) is water. It has a sprawling, irregular shape that extends into nine different townships, more than any other Illinois city. They are: Joliet, Plainfield, Troy, New Lenox, Jackson, Channahon, and Lockport in Will County, and Na-Au-Say and Seward in Kendall County. Joliet developed along the Des Plaines River, and its downtown is located in the river valley.

Joliet has a "west side" and "east side", referring to areas in relation to the river.

With the construction of highways and suburban development to the west, many businesses moved from the downtown area to the expanding areas west of the river. Many stores relocated to the west side in new strip malls and shopping centers with more parking and easier access. These changes resulted in the decline of the downtown shopping district, which is still felt today. Today, Joliet has a "west side" and a "far west side" (which includes all city limits in Kendall County). This has given rise to a newly referenced "Central Joliet" portion of the city, which essentially is all land west of the Des Plaines River and east of Interstate 55. Although no locals believe this, some internet scholars suggest this new reference may soon change the current meaning of "west side" to west of I-55

=== Climate ===
Joliet has a hot summer humid continental climate (Köppen Dfa) with hot, humid summers, and cold winters with moderate to heavy snowfall.

Climate data for Joliet, Illinois, 1991–2020 normals, extremes 1893–present
Month	Jan	Feb	Mar	Apr	May	Jun	Jul	Aug	Sep	Oct	Nov	Dec	Year
Record high °F (°C)	67 (19)	73 (23)	86 (30)	92 (33)	101 (38)	104 (40)	109 (43)	105 (41)	103 (39)	96 (36)	81 (27)	70 (21)	104 (40)
Mean maximum °F (°C)	53.8 (12.1)	57.0 (13.9)	70.5 (21.4)	79.9 (26.6)	87.7 (30.9)	92.6 (33.7)	93.7 (34.3)	91.6 (33.1)	89.6 (32.0)	82.3 (27.9)	68.2 (20.1)	56.7 (13.7)	95.0 (35.0)
Mean daily maximum °F (°C)	31.1 (−0.5)	35.4 (1.9)	47.0 (8.3)	59.9 (15.5)	71.0 (21.7)	80.3 (26.8)	83.6 (28.7)	81.8 (27.7)	76.2 (24.6)	63.3 (17.4)	48.5 (9.2)	36.4 (2.4)	59.5 (15.3)
Daily mean °F (°C)	23.9 (−4.5)	27.6 (−2.4)	38.1 (3.4)	49.4 (9.7)	60.2 (15.7)	70.1 (21.2)	73.9 (23.3)	72.3 (22.4)	65.7 (18.7)	53.3 (11.8)	40.4 (4.7)	29.4 (−1.4)	50.4 (10.2)
Mean daily minimum °F (°C)	16.6 (−8.6)	19.8 (−6.8)	29.2 (−1.6)	38.9 (3.8)	49.4 (9.7)	59.9 (15.5)	64.1 (17.8)	62.9 (17.2)	55.3 (12.9)	43.4 (6.3)	32.3 (0.2)	22.4 (−5.3)	41.2 (5.1)
Mean minimum °F (°C)	−5.4 (−20.8)	0.6 (−17.4)	12.1 (−11.1)	26.5 (−3.1)	37.2 (2.9)	47.1 (8.4)	55.1 (12.8)	54.6 (12.6)	42.1 (5.6)	30.0 (−1.1)	18.7 (−7.4)	3.1 (−16.1)	−9.1 (−22.8)
Record low °F (°C)	−26 (−32)	−23 (−31)	−18 (−28)	8 (−13)	26 (−3)	34 (1)	41 (5)	36 (2)	26 (−3)	14 (−10)	−10 (−23)	−25 (−32)	−26 (−32)
Average precipitation inches (mm)	1.99 (51)	1.78 (45)	2.27 (58)	3.93 (100)	4.53 (115)	4.30 (109)	4.55 (116)	3.97 (101)	3.17 (81)	3.14 (80)	2.46 (62)	1.94 (49)	38.03 (966)
Average snowfall inches (cm)	5.0 (13)	6.2 (16)	2.1 (5.3)	0.1 (0.25)	0.0 (0.0)	0.0 (0.0)	0.0 (0.0)	0.0 (0.0)	0.0 (0.0)	0.0 (0.0)	0.3 (0.76)	3.2 (8.1)	16.9 (43)
Average precipitation days (≥ 0.01 in)	11.4	9.3	10.2	12.3	12.4	10.6	9.2	9.2	8.0	9.5	9.9	10.6	122.6
Average snowy days (≥ 0.1 in)	4.2	3.4	1.2	0.1	0.0	0.0	0.0	0.0	0.0	0.0	0.4	2.7	12.0
Source: NOAA

== Demographics ==
Historical population
Census	Pop.	Note	%±
1840	2,558		—
1850	2,659		3.9%
1860	7,104		167.2%
1870	7,263		2.2%
1880	11,657		60.5%
1890	23,264		99.6%
1900	29,353		26.2%
1910	34,670		18.1%
1920	38,442		10.9%
1930	42,993		11.8%
1940	42,365		−1.5%
1950	51,601		21.8%
1960	66,780		29.4%
1970	78,827		18.0%
1980	77,956		−1.1%
1990	76,836		−1.4%
2000	106,221		38.2%
2010	147,459		38.8%
2020	150,362		2.0%
U.S. Decennial Census; 2010 2020

As of the 2020 census there were 150,362 people, 48,516 households, and 34,726 families residing in the city. The population density was 2,284.30 inhabitants per square mile (881.97/km^{2}). There were 52,737 housing units at an average density of 801.18 per square mile (309.34/km^{2}). The racial makeup of the city was 51.25% White, 16.25% African American, 1.00% Native American, 2.01% Asian, 0.03% Pacific Islander, 15.15% from other races, and 14.30% from two or more races. Hispanic or Latino of any race were 33.59% of the population.

There were 48,516 households, out of which 42.0% had children under the age of 18 living with them, 51.07% were married couples living together, 14.55% had a female householder with no husband present, and 28.42% were non-families. 24.02% of all households were made up of individuals, and 9.20% had someone living alone who was 65 years of age or older. The average household size was 3.58 and the average family size was 2.98.

The city's age distribution consisted of 27.1% under the age of 18, 10.7% from 18 to 24, 27.9% from 25 to 44, 24% from 45 to 64, and 10.2% who were 65 years of age or older. The median age was 33.8 years. For every 100 females, there were 98.1 males. For every 100 females age 18 and over, there were 96.5 males.

The median income for a household in the city was $72,871, and the median income for a family was $86,198. Males had a median income of $48,865 versus $30,185 for females. The per capita income for the city was $29,615. About 8.4% of families and 10.5% of the population were below the poverty line, including 16.0% of those under age 18 and 9.2% of those age 65 or over.

Joliet city, Illinois – Racial and ethnic composition Note: the US Census treats Hispanic/Latino as an ethnic category. This table excludes Latinos from the racial categories and assigns them to a separate category. Hispanics/Latinos may be of any race.
Race / Ethnicity (NH = Non-Hispanic)	Pop 2000	Pop 2010	Pop 2020	% 2000	% 2010	% 2020
White alone (NH)	64,811	78,159	67,903	61.02%	53.01%	45.16%
Black or African American alone (NH)	19,125	23,025	23,814	18.00%	15.62%	15.84%
Native American or Alaska Native alone (NH)	159	192	156	0.15%	0.13%	0.10%
Asian alone (NH)	1,190	2,747	2,927	1.12%	1.86%	1.95%
Native Hawaiian or Pacific Islander alone (NH)	14	18	21	0.01%	0.01%	0.01%
Other race alone (NH)	103	153	464	0.10%	0.10%	0.31%
Mixed race or Multiracial (NH)	1,267	2,097	4,567	1.19%	1.42%	3.04%
Hispanic or Latino (any race)	19,552	41,042	50,510	18.41%	27.84%	33.59%
Total	106,221	147,433	150,362	100.00%	100.00%	100.00%

=== Religion ===
According to the official website for the city of Joliet:

Joliet's diverse faith community represents over 60 denominations and offers residents services at more than 150 churches, synagogues, and houses of worship. Along with their spiritual offerings, these houses of worship enrich the Joliet area by providing some of the area's finest examples of Romanesque, Gothic, Byzantine, and Renaissance architecture. The spiritual community in Joliet welcomes newcomers with open arms, offering regular worship services and religious education.

Catholic institutions in Joliet include Joliet Catholic Academy and the University of St Francis.

== Economy ==
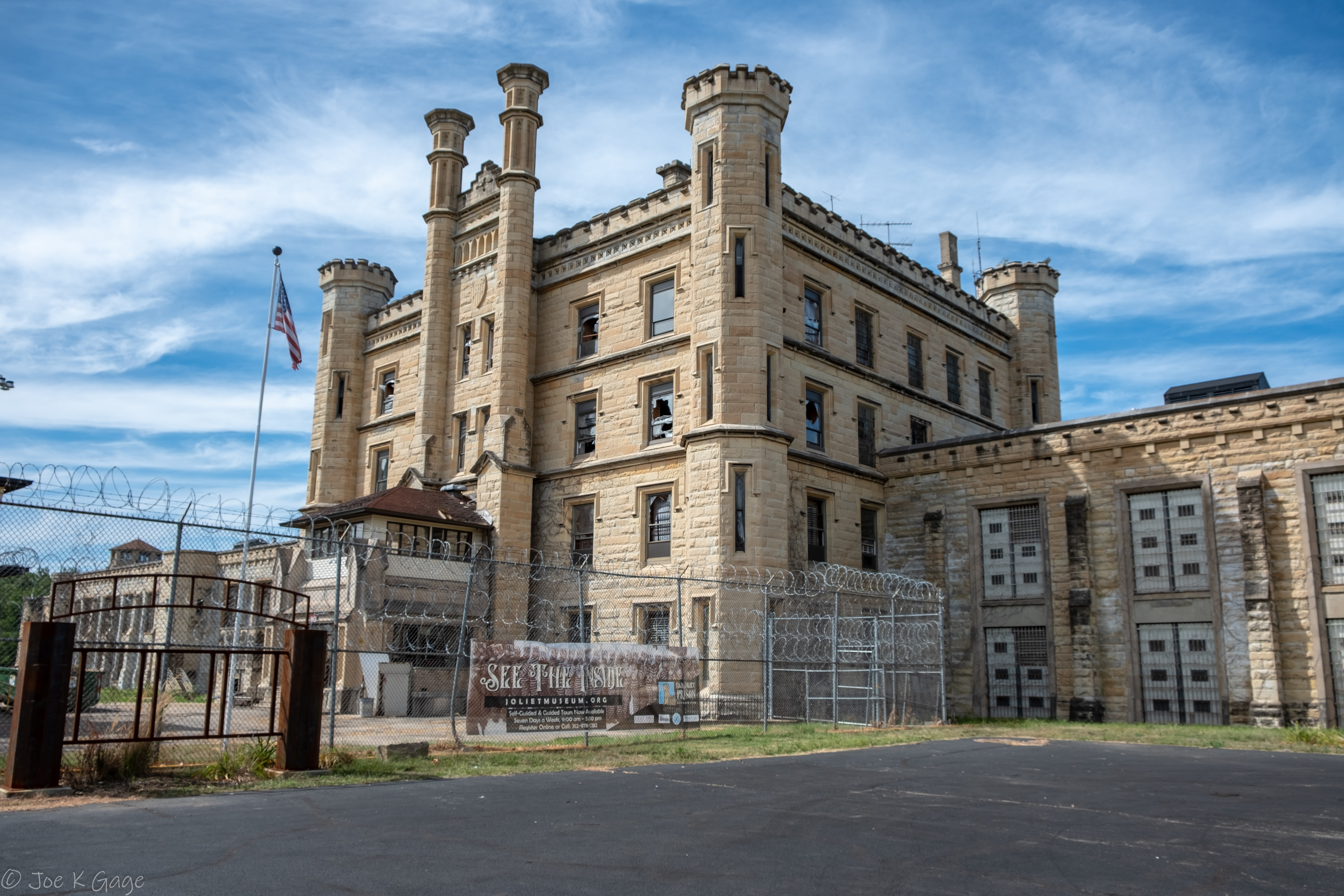
The former Joliet Correctional Center, now a museum

Like many Midwestern and East Coast cities dependent on manufacturing industries, Joliet has experienced past economic troubles. As of 2017, the rate of unemployment in Joliet was around 6.4%. The city is evolving from a steel and manufacturing suburb to a commuter suburb in the Chicago metropolitan area. Some new migrants to the Chicago area are working in bordering Cook County (the nation's second-most populous county) and living in Joliet.

The downtown area of Joliet has slowly attracted new businesses to the area. The main attractions in Joliet's city center are the Harrah's Casino, Joliet Slammers baseball (Duly Health and Care Field), Hollywood Casino, and the Rialto Square Theatre, also known as the 'Jewel of Joliet'.

The Illinois Youth Center Joliet, a juvenile correctional facility of the Illinois Department of Juvenile Justice, opened in April 1959.

=== Largest employers ===
According to the city's 2017 Comprehensive Annual Financial Report, the largest employers in the city are:

#	Employer	Employees
1	Amazon	3,500
2	AMITA Health Saint Joseph Medical Center	3,023
3	Will County	2,200
4	Joliet Junior College	1,553
5	Joliet Public Schools District 86	1,256
6	Joliet Township High School District 204	916
7	City of Joliet	894
8	Harrah's Joliet	800
9	ExxonMobil	680
10	Hollywood Casino Joliet	600

== Arts and culture ==
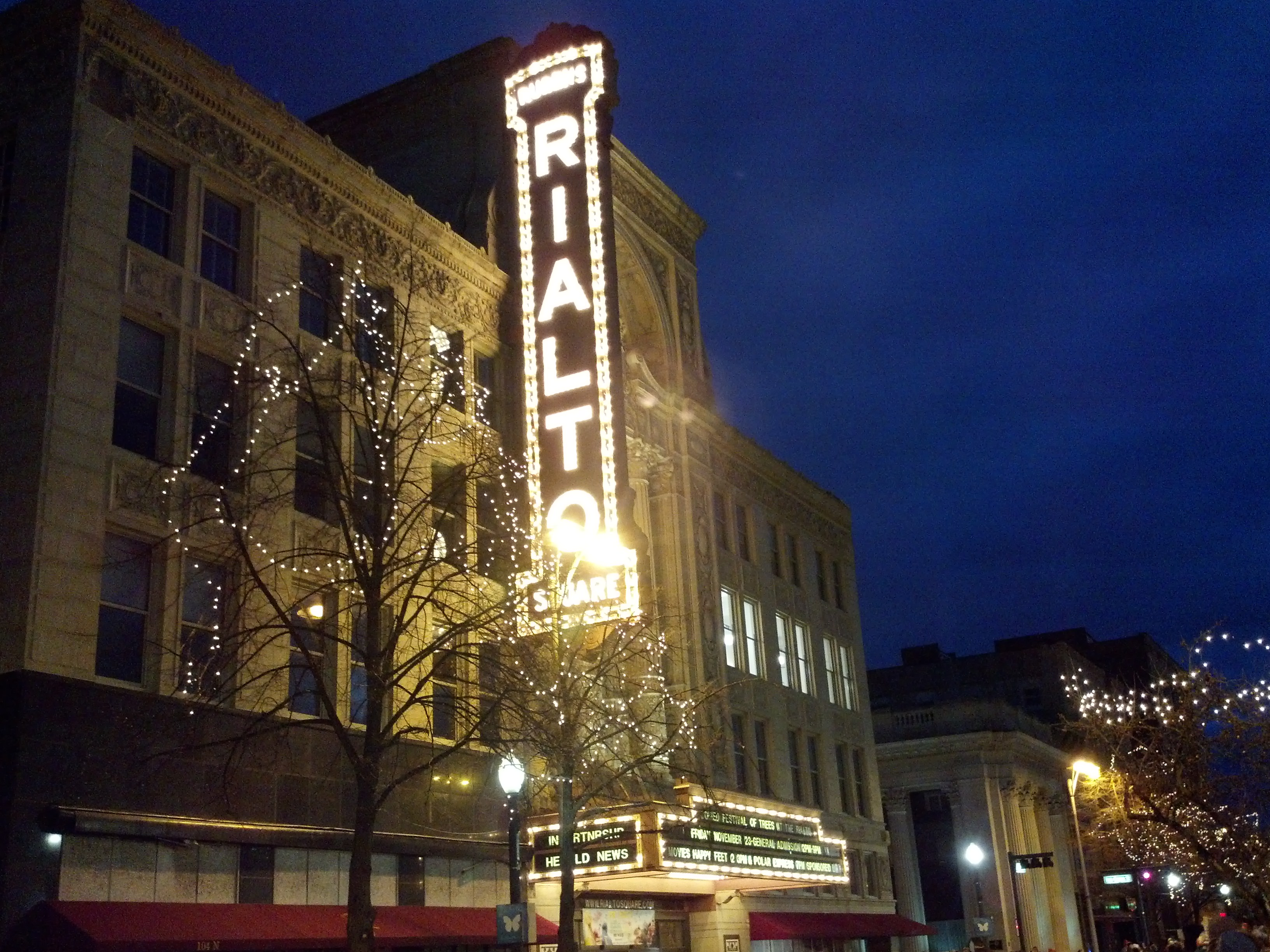
The Rialto Square Theatre in downtown Joliet

The Rialto Square Theatre, a favorite haunt of Al Capone and filming location for scenes from Kevin Bacon's film Stir of Echoes, is on Chicago Street, downtown. Near the theatre, the Joliet Area Historical Museum commemorates the history of Joliet, especially its heritage as a stopping point on U.S. Route 66. Among local landmarks are the Chicagoland Speedway (NASCAR) and the Route 66 Raceway (NHRA).

The Auditorium Building is located at the northeast corner of Chicago and Clinton Streets. Designed by G. Julian Barnes and built of limestone in 1891, it was controversial as one of the first buildings to combine religious, civic, and commercial uses. Nonetheless, people such Theodore Roosevelt visited and spoke at the building. The building was originally built for the Universalist Unitarian Church of Joliet, but the church sold the building in 1993, and it is no longer home to the congregation.

The Jacob A. Henry Mansion, 20 South Eastern Avenue, is a three-story, red-brick, Second Empire/Italian Renaissance-style structure built on a Joliet limestone foundation in 1873 (completed in 1876). The structure is set on bedrock and the entire basement floor is made of Joliet limestone from the building owner's quarry. The walls of the structure are constructed of red Illinois sandstone and deep red brick specially fired in Ohio (wrapped individually and shipped by barge to Joliet). A commanding three-story tower is the focal point of the structure. The structure has steel trim with slate shingles on a mansard roof. The front and side porches are single slabs of limestone. The largest stone ever quarried lies in the sidewalk under the front entry gate. The stone is 9×22×20 ft. In 1885, an immense Byzantine dome was added to the south façade.

The interior of the Jacob A. Henry Mansion has elaborate polished-walnut woodwork, massive, carved pocket doors, original wood mantles, and a solid-walnut staircase. The original owner, Mr. Henry, was a railroad magnate, building railroads in Indiana, Ohio, and Illinois. He had ownership in a local quarry and was a principal stockholder in Will County National Bank. The mansion won the architecture award at the American Centennial Celebration in Philadelphia in 1876. The structure is a local landmark, part of the East Side National Register District and individually listed on the National Register of Historic Places.

The Joliet Prison is located near Joliet's downtown district on Collins Street. The prison has been featured in both television shows and movies. One such television series filmed there was Prison Break. The prison was also used for the opening scenes in the 1980 movie, The Blues Brothers, which starred John Belushi as "Joliet" Jake Blues and Dan Aykroyd as Elwood Blues.

The first Dairy Queen store opened in Joliet. The location is now occupied by Universal Church.

Two casinos originated as riverboat casino in Joliet: the Hollywood Casino near Channahon and a Harrah's hotel and casino downtown.

The Louis Joliet Mall is located near the intersection of I-55 and U.S. Route 30.

The former Joliet Arsenal (now the site of both the Abraham Lincoln National Cemetery and the Midewin National Tallgrass Prairie) is in nearby Elwood.

== Sports ==
Joliet is home to three high schools that bear its name: Joliet Central, Joliet West, and Joliet Catholic Academy (JCA), in addition to Plainfield South High School and the closed Joliet East, each of which has sports programs. JCA has been a major football powerhouse for many years and has won more state football titles than any other team in the state, with 15 as of 2023.

Joliet is the home of the University of St Francis athletics, nicknamed the Fighting Saints. The Fighting Saints participate in 20 intercollegiate varsity sports as a member of the National Association of Intercollegiate Athletics (NAIA) in the Chicagoland Collegiate Athletic Conference (CCAC) and Mid-States Football Association (MSFA).

Joliet also is home to a minor-league baseball team, the Joliet Slammers of the independent Frontier League. Since the beginning of the 2011 season, they have played their home games at Duly Health and Care Field. The Slammers replace the former Joliet JackHammers of the Northern League. The Joliet Slammers won the 2011 Frontier League Championship in their first season as a team.

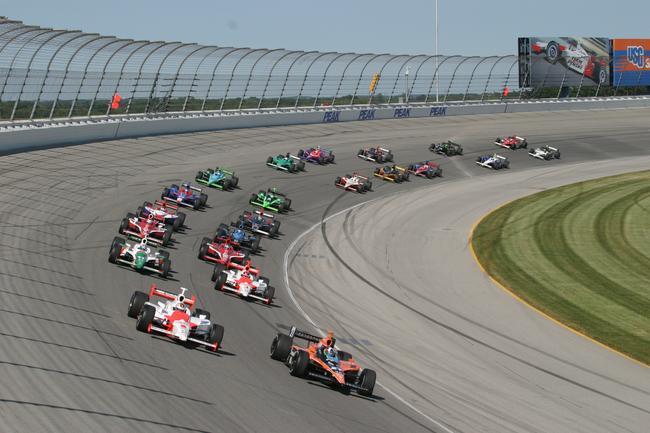
Chicagoland Speedway

Chicagoland Speedway holds events from NASCAR. During major races, the large influx of fans means that the number of people in the city is double that of the official figure. Next door to the Speedway, the Route 66 Raceway features National Hot Rod Association events on its drag strip. Joliet Central has become actively involved in Route 66 by building an alternative fuel vehicle. Autobahn Country Club, also located in Joliet, has held the SCCA World Challenge, Atlantic Championship, and Star Mazda Championship races since 2009.

Joliet soccer team Sueño FC compete in the USL League Two competition.

== Parks and recreation ==
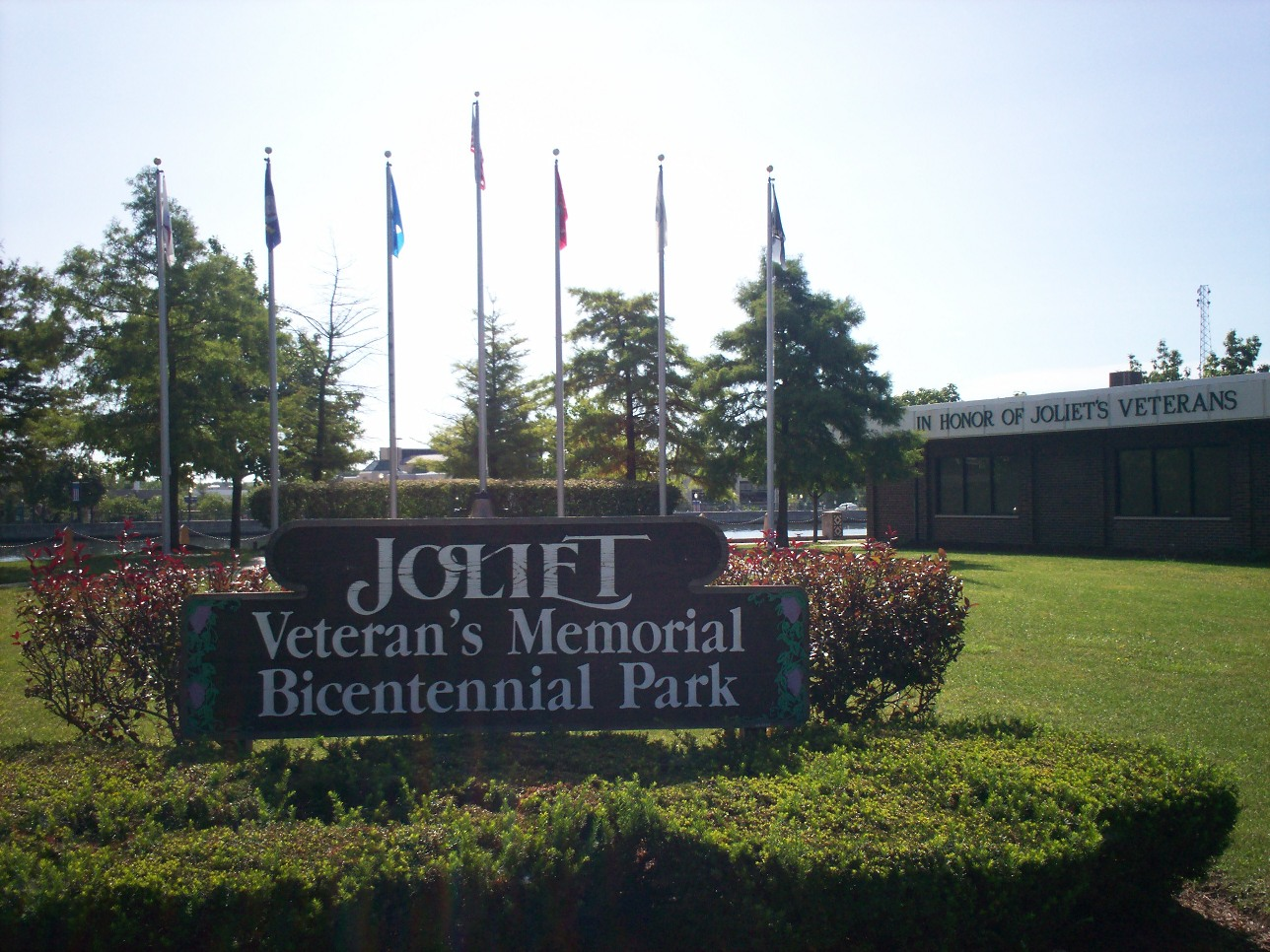
Joliet Veteran's Memorial Bicentennial Park

=== Golf courses ===
Three golf courses are located in the city of Joliet: Inwood Golf Course, Woodruff Golf Course, and Wedgewood Golf Course. Disc golf courses are available at Highland Park and West Park.

=== Family entertainment ===
The Pilcher Park Nature Center, located in Pilcher Park, hosts many youth and educational programs. Pilcher Park, one of Joliet's oldest parks, is home to over 640 acres (260 ha) of land that provide a habitat for abundant wildlife and outdoor recreation. Pilcher Park also contains Native American Indian remains and was the site of a Potowatami Indian village. A burial mound is just south of the entrance on Gougar Road, on the south side of the bridge, and a marked burial plot is inside the park grounds.

Hammel Woods is also located in Joliet with miles of hiking trails and even a seven-acre dog park.

Louis Joliet Mall located on Route 30 in Joliet hosts a large Cinemark theatre

=== Bicycle trails ===
The Rock Run and Joliet Junction Trails are roughly north–south routes that begin at the Theodore Marsh in Crest Hill, Illinois, and have southern termini on the I&M Canal State Trail. These three paths can be used as a 16-mile loop through western Joliet. The I and M Canal State Trail stretches about 60 miles to Peru. The Wauponsee Glacial Trail also begins close to town.

== Education ==
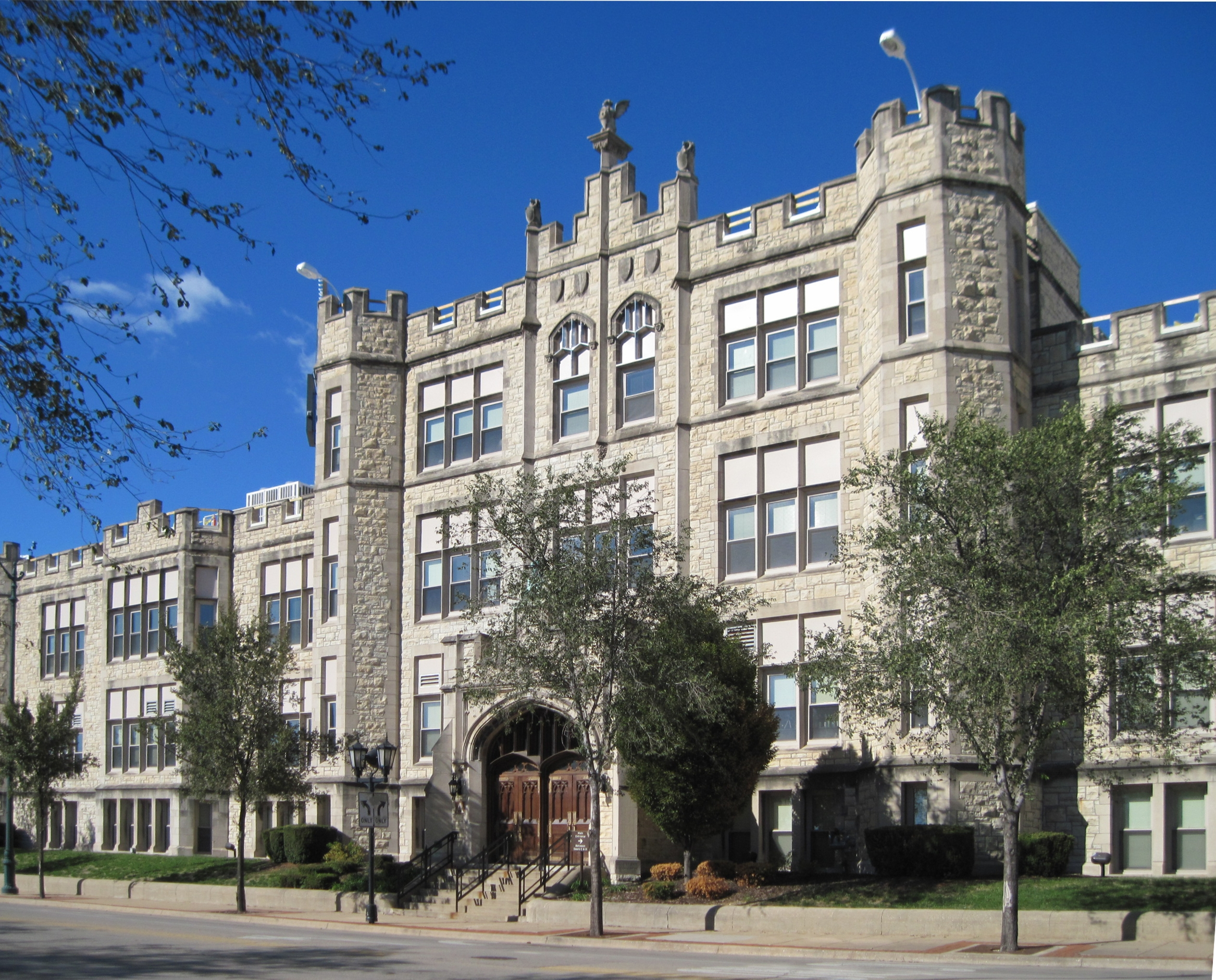
Joliet Central High School

=== Colleges and universities ===
- Joliet Junior College, the nation's first public community college
- University of St. Francis

=== K-12 schools ===
In Will County, parts of Joliet are in the Joliet Public School District 86, Troy Community Consolidated School District 30C, the Laraway Community Consolidated School District 70C, Union School District 81, Elwood Community Consolidated School District 203, and the Rockdale School District 84. These districts feed into the Joliet Township High School District 204. Another part is in the Plainfield School District 202, a K-12 school district. Another part is in the New Lenox School District 122, which feeds into the Lincoln Way Community High School District 210.

In Kendall County, parts of Joliet are in the Minooka Community Consolidated School District 201 and the Minooka Community High School District 111. Other parts are in the Plainfield school district, the Oswego Community Unit School District 308, and the Yorkville Community Unit School District 115.

Public high schools in Joliet include:

- Joliet Central High School (Joliet high school district)
- Joliet West High School (Joliet high school district)
- Plainfield South High School (Plainfield school district, Joliet city limits).
- Joliet East High School (defunct)

Joliet Catholic Academy is a private school in Joliet.

=== Career training ===
Since the early 1980s, the Job Corps of the U.S. Department of Labor has operated the Joliet Job Corps Center on the campus of the former Joliet East High School.

== Infrastructure ==
=== Transportation ===
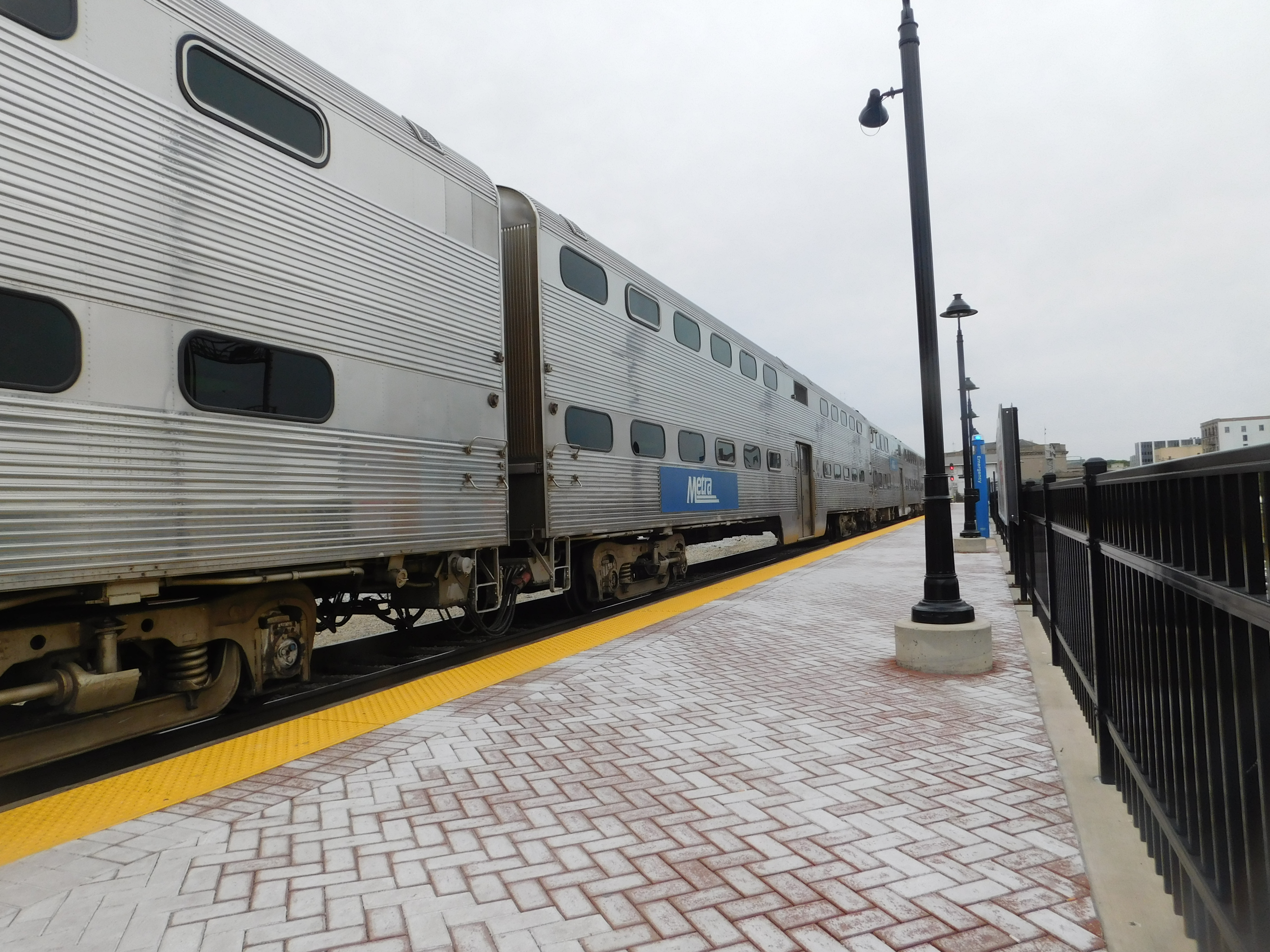
Joliet Transportation Center, served by Amtrak and Metra passenger trains

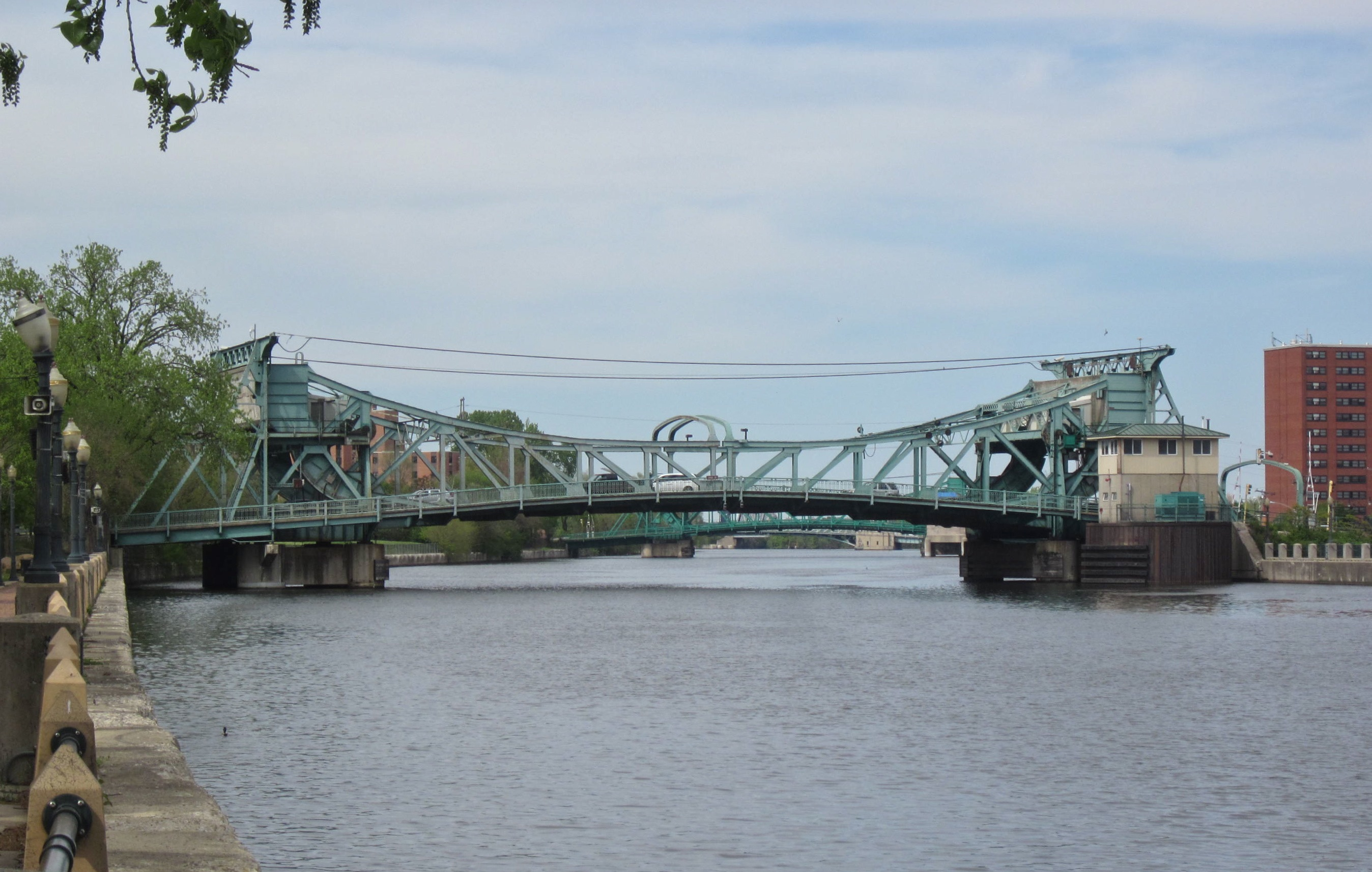
The Cass Street Bridge is one of five 1930s bascule bridges spanning the Des Plaines River in Joliet.

Situated about 40 miles (64 km) southwest of central Chicago, Joliet has long been a significant transportation hub. It lies on both sides of the Des Plaines River, a major waterway in Northern Illinois, and was one of the principal ports on the Illinois and Michigan Canal. The Chicago & Rock Island Railroad and Michigan Central came through in the 1850s, and the Atchison, Topeka and Santa Fe Railway and Chicago & Alton Railroad soon followed, with the Elgin, Joliet and Eastern Railway and Milwaukee Road lines built around the turn of the century.

U.S. Highways 6 (the Grand Army of the Republic Highway), 30 (the Lincoln Highway), 45, 52, and 66 (Route 66) all ran through the city. In the 1960s, Interstate 55 and Interstate 80 made their way through Joliet, linking up near Channahon just west of the city limits. The phrase "Crossroads of Mid-America", found on the Joliet seal, is an allusion to the intersection of I-80 and I-55 (and, historically, the intersection between the Lincoln Highway and Route 66).

Joliet Transportation Center is the final stop on the Metra rail lines from Chicago for the Heritage Corridor route from Chicago Union Station and the Rock Island District route from LaSalle Street Station. A third line, the STAR Line, would have also terminated at the station, but the project was shelved as of 2012.

Pace provides local bus service six days a week (no service on Sundays) with buses leaving from a terminal in downtown Joliet once an hour.

Amtrak serves Joliet Union Station daily via its Lincoln Service and Texas Eagle routes. Service consists of four Lincoln Service round-trips between Chicago and St. Louis, and one Texas Eagle round-trip between San Antonio and Chicago. Three days a week, the Eagle continues on to Los Angeles.

==== Airports ====
The Joliet Regional Airport is located off Jefferson Street near Interstate 55. Lewis University Airport is located to the north in the nearby village of Romeoville and is owned by the Joliet Regional Port District.

==== Major highways ====
Major highways in Joliet include:

Interstate Highways
Interstate 55
Interstate 80

US Highways
US 6
US 30
US 52
US 66

Illinois Highways
Route 7
Route 53
Route 59
Route 171

=== Hospitals ===
Joliet currently has one hospital within its city limits: Presence Saint Joseph Medical Center (also known as St. Joe's), located on the west side. Silver Cross Hospital, now located in neighboring New Lenox, was located on Joliet's east side. These were the only two hospitals in the history of the existence of Will County until AMITA Bolingbrook Adventist Hospital opened in January 2008. In September 2008, Silver Cross Hospital broke ground for a new facility on Maple Road (U.S. Route 6) in New Lenox, immediately west of Interstate 355. All patients were transferred to the new hospital on February 26, 2012, and the old facility was completely vacated and later demolished.

== In popular culture ==
In the 1980 John Landis film The Blues Brothers, John Belushi's Jake Blues is nicknamed "Joliet Jake" as he was imprisoned at the now closed Joliet Correctional Center. The Joliet Prison has been a site for many other films and television shows, such as the film Let's Go to Prison, and the opening season of Fox's Prison Break was filmed predominately at the Joliet Prison, at which time part of the prison was still in use.

The 1999 film Stir of Echoes starring Kevin Bacon had scenes shot on at the Rialto Square Theatre (the hypnotism scenes in which James saw the word "Dig" on the movie screen), at the corner of Scott Street and Washington, and at the old Menards that took over the Wieboldt's building at Jefferson Square Mall.

The 2019 American drama Working Man, was shot in Joliet.

== See also ==
- List of cities in Illinois
- List of Midwestern cities by size
- List of United States cities by population
- List of U.S. states' largest cities by population
