= List of Midwestern urban areas =

Urbanized areas in the United States are defined by the U.S. Census Bureau as contiguous census block groups with a population density of at least 1,000 per square mile (about 400 per square km). Urban areas are delineated without regard to political boundaries. Urban areas with a population of at least 50,000 serve as the core of a metropolitan statistical area.

== Areas over 100,000 ==
The following is a list of urbanized areas in the American Midwest with a population of at least 100,000. States within the Midwest are Illinois, Indiana, Iowa, Kansas, Michigan, Minnesota, Missouri, Nebraska, North Dakota, Ohio, South Dakota and Wisconsin. Areas are ranked based on population as listed in the 2020 U.S. Census.

Rank	Urbanized Area	Population (2010 census)	Population (2020 census)
1	Chicago, IL-IN-WI	8,608,208	8,671,746
2	Detroit, MI	3,737,090	3,776,890
3	Minneapolis-St. Paul, MN-WI	2,650,890	2,914,866
4	St. Louis, MO-IL	2,150,706	2,156,323
5	Cleveland, OH	1,780,603	1,712,178
6	Indianapolis, IN	1,487,483	1,699,881
7	Cincinnati, OH-KY (Note: Part of this statistical area is outside the Midwest)	1,624,827	1,686,744
8	Kansas City, MO-KS	1,519,417	1,674,218
9	Columbus, OH	1,368,035	1,567,254
10	Milwaukee, WI	1,376,476	1,306,795
11	Omaha, NE-IA	725,008	819,508
12	Dayton, OH	724,091	674,046
13	Grand Rapids, MI	569,935	605,666
14	Des Moines, IA	450,070	542,486
15	Akron, OH	569,499	541,879
16	Wichita, KS	472,870	500,231
17	Toledo, OH-MI	507,643	497,952
18	Madison, WI	401,661	450,305
19	Fort Wayne, IN	313,492	335,934
20	Youngstown, OH	387,550	320,901
21	Lansing, MI	313,532	318,300
22	Ann Arbor, MI	306,022	317,689
23	Flint, MI	356,218	298,964
24	Canton, OH		295,319
25	Lincoln, NE	258,719	291,217
26	Davenport, IA	280,051	285,211
27	Springfield, MO	273,724	282,651
28	South Bend, IN-MI	278,165	278,921
29	Rockford, IL	296,863	276,443
30	Round Lake Beach, Illinois, IL-WI	290,373	261,835
31	Peoria, IL	266,921	259,781
32	Appleton, WI	216,154	230,967
33	Green Bay, WI	206,520	224,156
34	Fargo-Moorhead, ND-MN	176,676	216,214
35	Evansville, IN	229,351	206,855
36	Kalamazoo, MI	255,452	204,562
37	Lorain-Elyria, OH	180,956	199,067
38	Sioux Falls, SD	124,269	194,283
39	Cedar Rapids, IA	177,844	192,844
40	Muskegon, MI	161,280	166,414
41	Springfield, IL	161,316	282,651
42	Lafayette, IN	147,725	157,100
43	Topeka, KS	150,003	148,956
44	Elkhart, IN	143,592	148,199
45	Champaign-Urbana, IL	145,361	147,452
46	South Lyon-Hamburg-Genoa, Michigan, MI	119,509	145,963
47	Columbia, MO	124,748	141,831
48	Racine, WI	133,700	134,877
49	Bloomington, IL	132,600	134,100
50	Iowa City, IA	106,621	126,810
51	Kenosha, WI-IL	124,064	125,865
52	Rochester, MN	107,677	121,587
53	Duluth, MN-WI	124,064	119,411
54	St. Cloud, MN	110,621	117,638
55	Saginaw, MI	126,265	116,058
56	Waterloo, IA	113,418	114,139
57	Sioux City, IA-NE-SD	106,494	113,066
58	Bloomington, IN	108,651	110,103
59	Holland, MI	99,941	107,034
60	Eau Claire, WI	102,852	105,475

== Areas under 100,000 ==
The following are areas which in the 2020 U.S. Census Bureau had a population under 100,000 and over 50,000. Areas are ranked based on population as listed in the 2020 U.S. Census.

Rank	Area	Population (2000 census)	Population (2020 census)
61	La Crosse, WI-MN	100,868	98,872
62	Bismarck, ND	81,955	98,198
63	Lawrence, KS	88,053	94,998
64	Middleton, OH	97,503	93,608
65	Lee's Summit, MO	85,081	91,960
66	Joplin, MO	82,775	86,679
67	Decatur, IL	93,863	86,287
68	Rapid City, SD	81,251	85,679
69	Muncie, IN	90,580	84,382
70	Jackson, MI	90,057	84,307
71	Springfield, OH	85,256	82,369
72	Port Huron, MI	87,106	82,226
73	Newark, OH	76,068	81,223
74	Terre Haute, IN	92,742	79,862
75	Anderson, IN	88,133	79,517
76	Alton, IL-MO	83,890	79,260
77	Wausau, WI	74,632	77,429
78	St. Joseph, MO-KS	81,176	77,187
79	Oshkosh, WI	74,495	76,190
80	Battle Creek, MI	78,393	75,513
81	Sheboygan, WI	71,313	74,369
82	Mansfield, OH	75,250	73,545
83	Janesville, WI	69,658	72,285
84	Michigan City-La Porte, IN-MI	66,025	71,367
85	Dubuque, IA-IL	67,818	70,332
86	Lima, OH	72,852	68,630
87	Bay City, MI	70,585	68,472
88	Grand Forks, ND-MN	61,270	68,160
89	Kankakee, IL	81,926	66,530
90	Ames, IA	60,438	66,342
91	Dekalb, IL	68,545	64,736
92	Beloit, WI-IL	63,835	63,073
93	Kokomo, IN	62,182	62,576
94	Benton Harbor-St. Joseph-Fair Plain, MI	61,022	61,888
95	Sandusky, OH	50,693	61,743
96	Columbus, IN	54,933	60,982
97	Manhattan, KS	54,622	60,454
98	Mankato, MN	57,584	60,206
99	Monroe, MI	51,240	57,260
100	Traverse City, MI		56,890
101	Cape Girardeau, MO-IL	52,900	55,546
104	Grand Island, NE	50,440	55,099
105	Fond du Lac, WI	54,901	54,731
106	Midland, MI	59,014	52,340
107	Valparaiso-Shorewood Forest, IN		51,867
108	Minot, ND		50,925
109	Jefferson City, MO	58,533	50,775

== See also ==
- List of United States urban areas
- List of Midwestern metropolitan areas
- List of Midwestern cities by size
