= Upper Bluff Historic District =

Historic district in Illinois, United States

- U.S. National Register of Historic Places
- U.S. Historic district
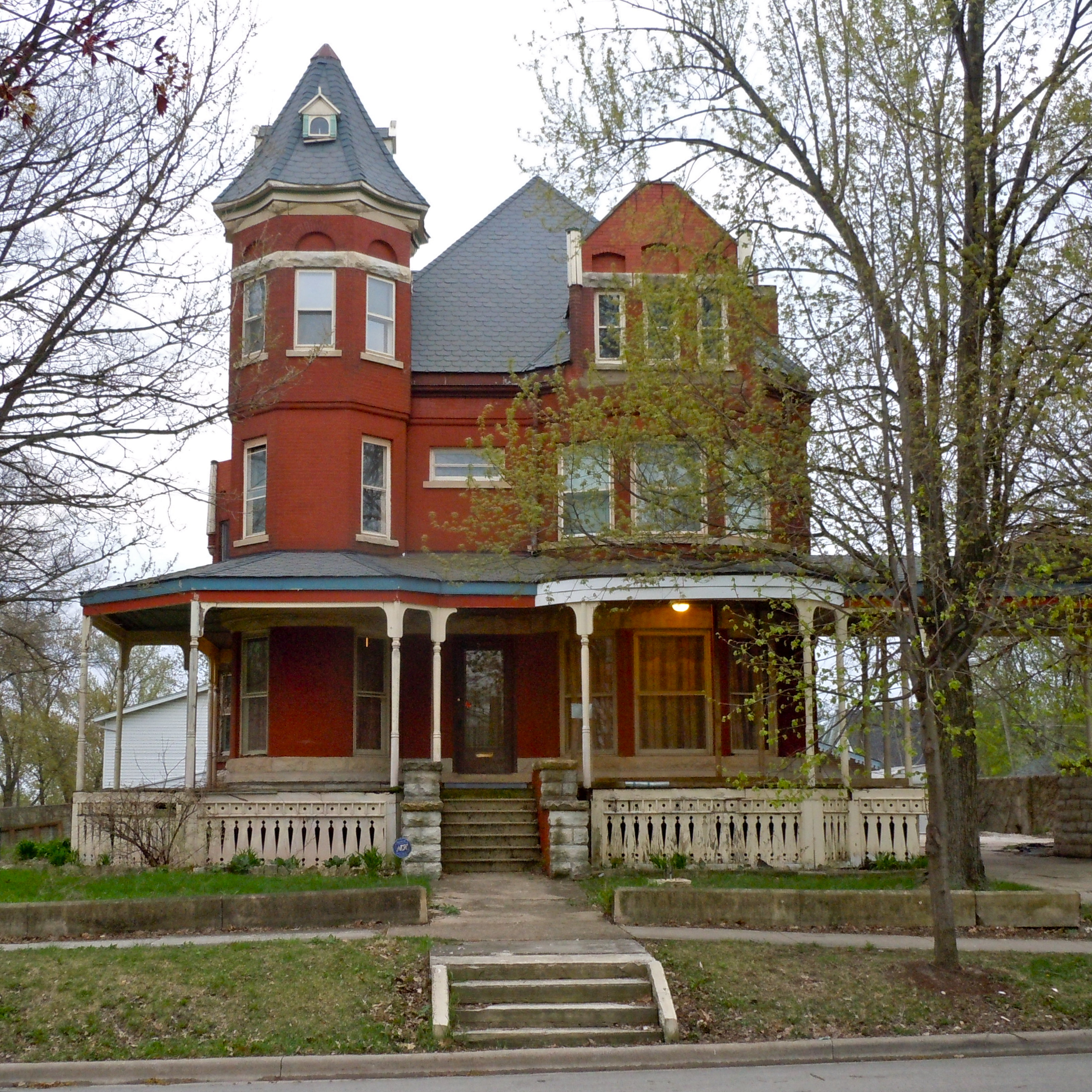

- Location within Illinois Location within the United States
- Location: Roughly bounded by Taylor, Center and Campbell Streets and Raynor Avenue; Joliet, Will County, Illinois, U.S.
- Coordinates: 41°31′45″N 88°5′47″W
- Architectural style: Italianate, Classical Revival, Queen Anne
- NRHP reference No.: 91000687
- Added to NRHP: June 5, 1991

The Upper Bluff Historic District is a set of 616 buildings in Joliet, Illinois. Of these 616 buildings, 517 contribute to the historical integrity of the area.

== History ==
The oldest building in the district is the Campbell House, erected around 1850 (176 years ago). The property was owned by Charles Reed, who operated a grist mill on the Des Plaines River. Campbell enjoyed the view from the bluff overlooking the rest of the growing city. He later sold the property to Joseph Campbell, who constructed a mansion on the site. Following his death, his wife Barbara Campbell held on to the property until forced to subdivide it in 1863 to alleviate the tax burden. This became the first subdivision in the historic district. Charlotte Anne Strong further divided the properties, taking particular care in preserving the environment.

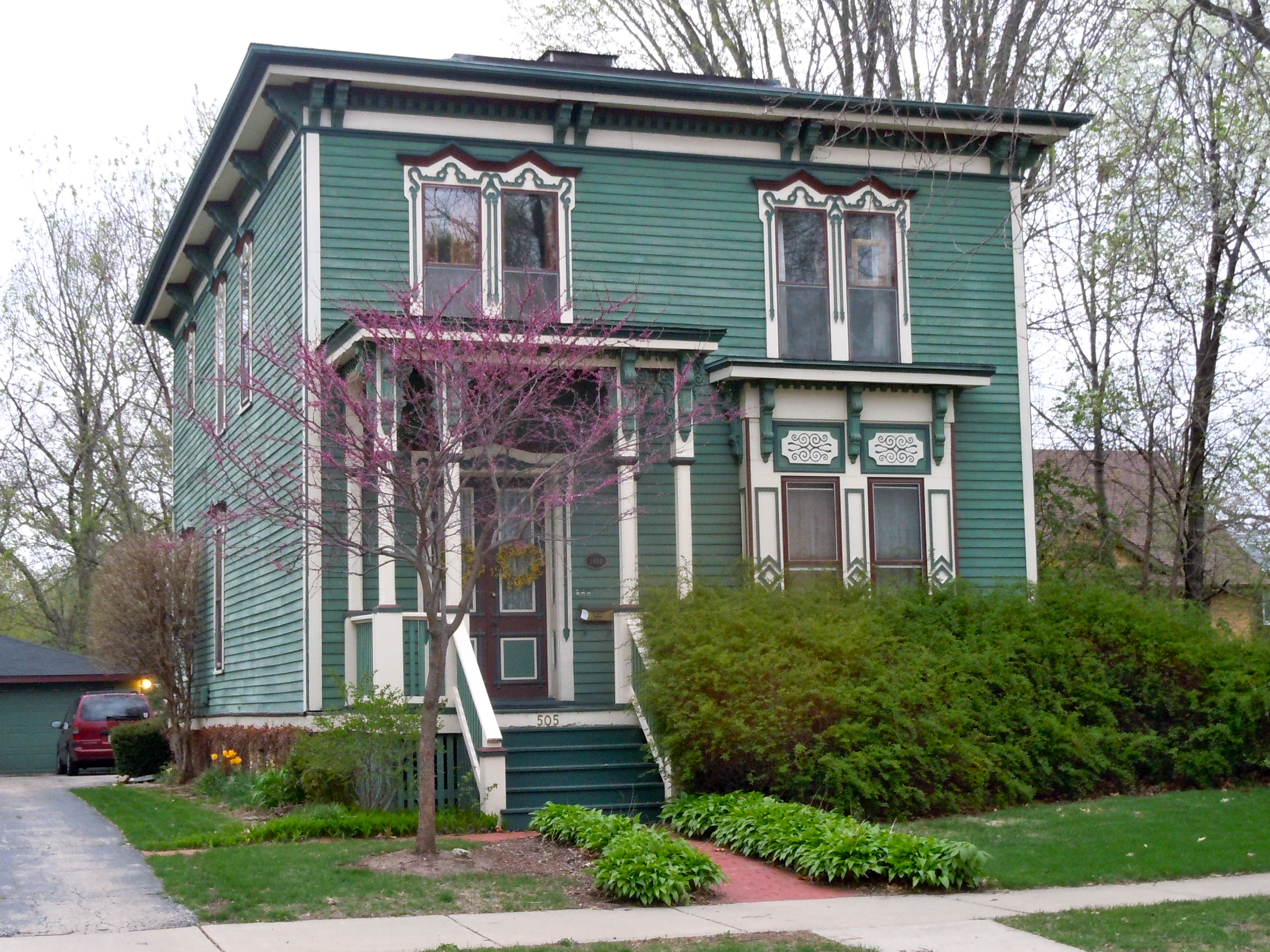
Italianate house

Only a few houses were constructed in the district in the next thirty-five years. The Italianate Fox House was constructed in 1885 and may have attracted other residents to the area. Eleven houses were built on the Upper Bluff from 1888 through 1889, a trend that would continue through the 1890s. Joliet flourished in the early 20th century, further attracting residents to the region. The main commercial district was along Bluff Street, on the west side of the Des Plaines River. Upper Bluff's proximity to the commercial district likely influenced a period of growth of neighborhoods similar to the Joliet East Side Historic District. Some East Side families relocated to the Upper Bluff as pollution from industrial growth in the east increased. The demand for housing was large enough as to attract multiple-family dwellings on the west half of the district. However, Joliet was hit hard by the Great Depression in the 1930s, hampering further development. The Upper Bluff Historic District was added to the National Register of Historic Places on June 5, 1991.

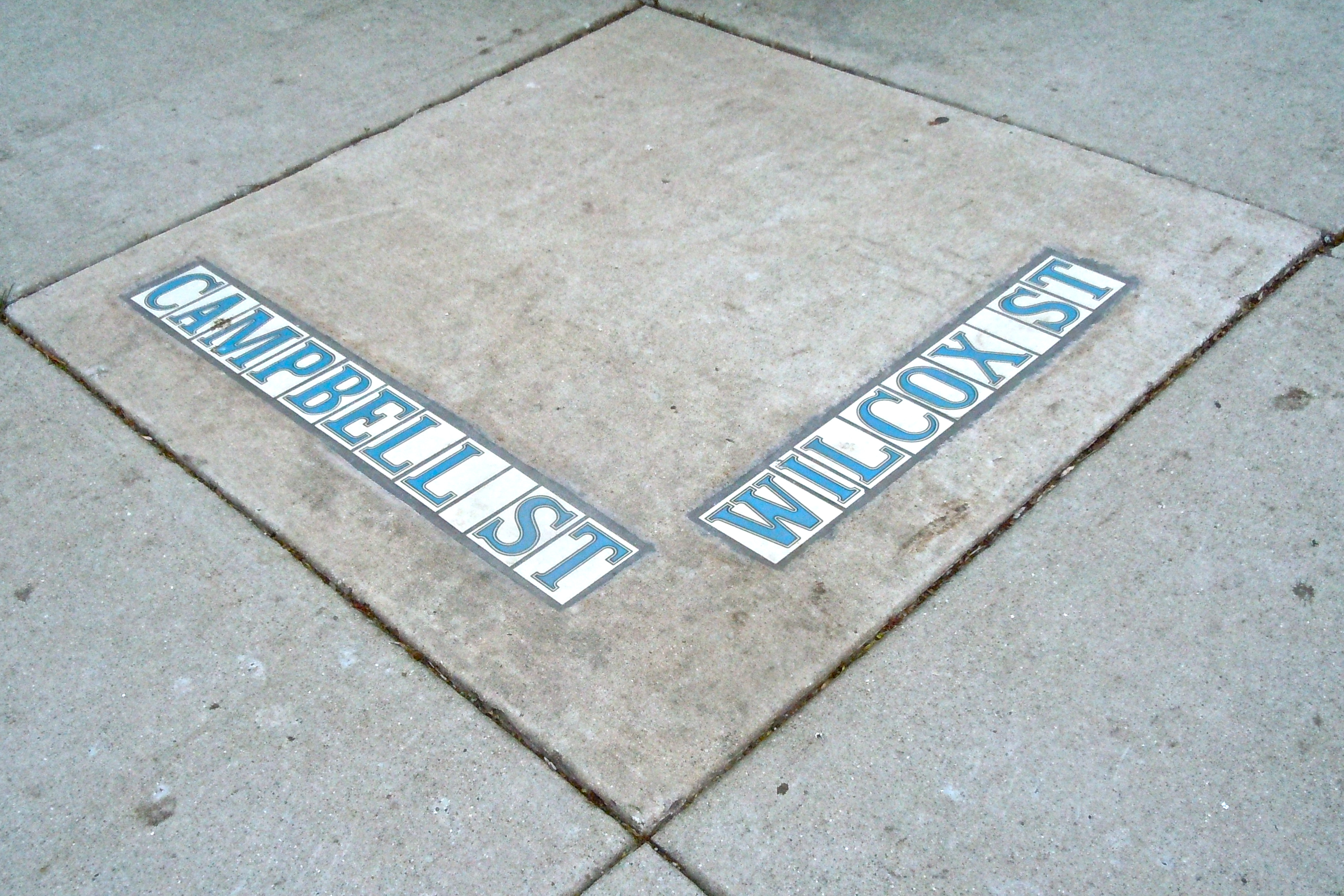
Corner of Campbell and Wilcox Streets

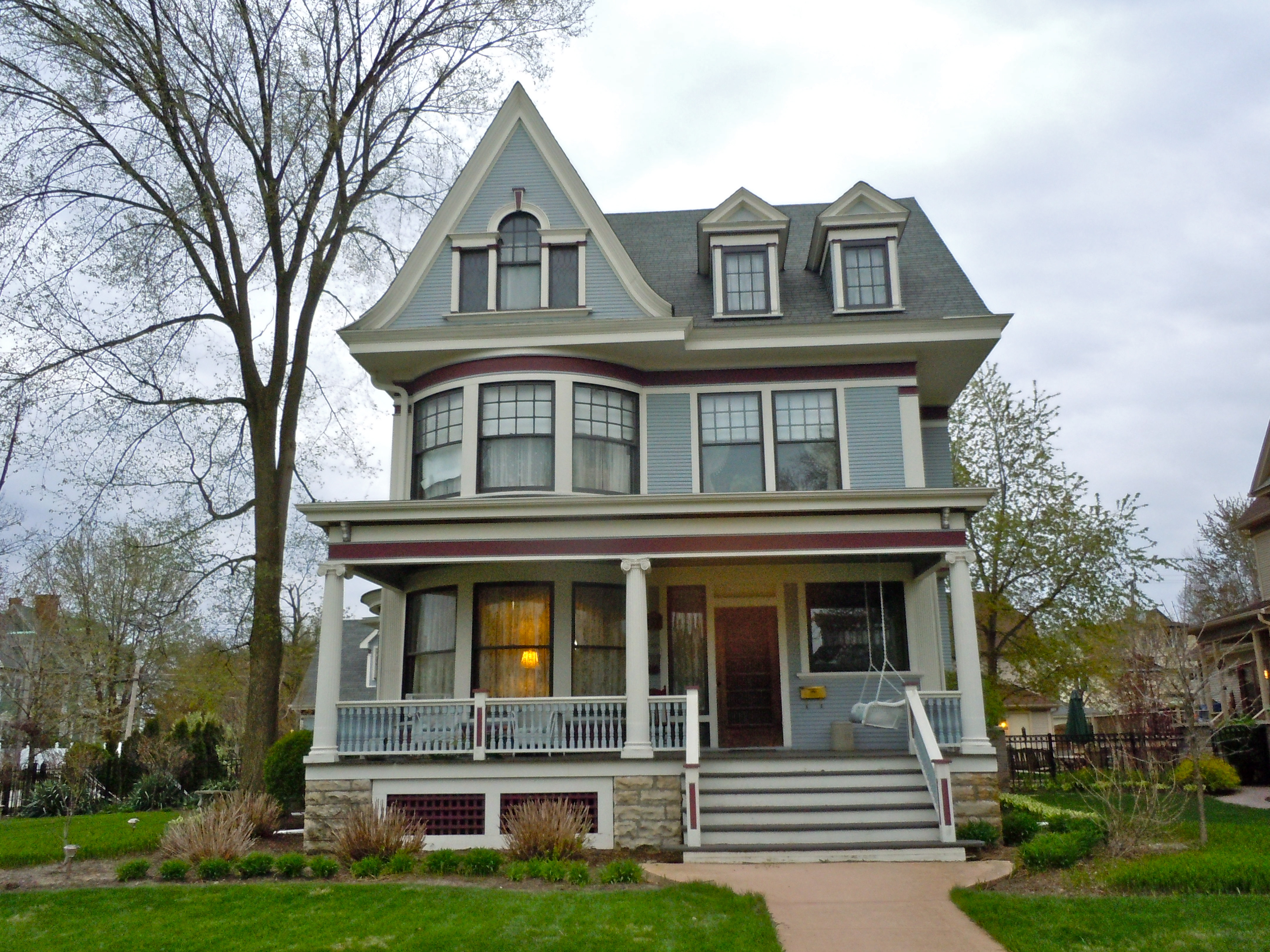

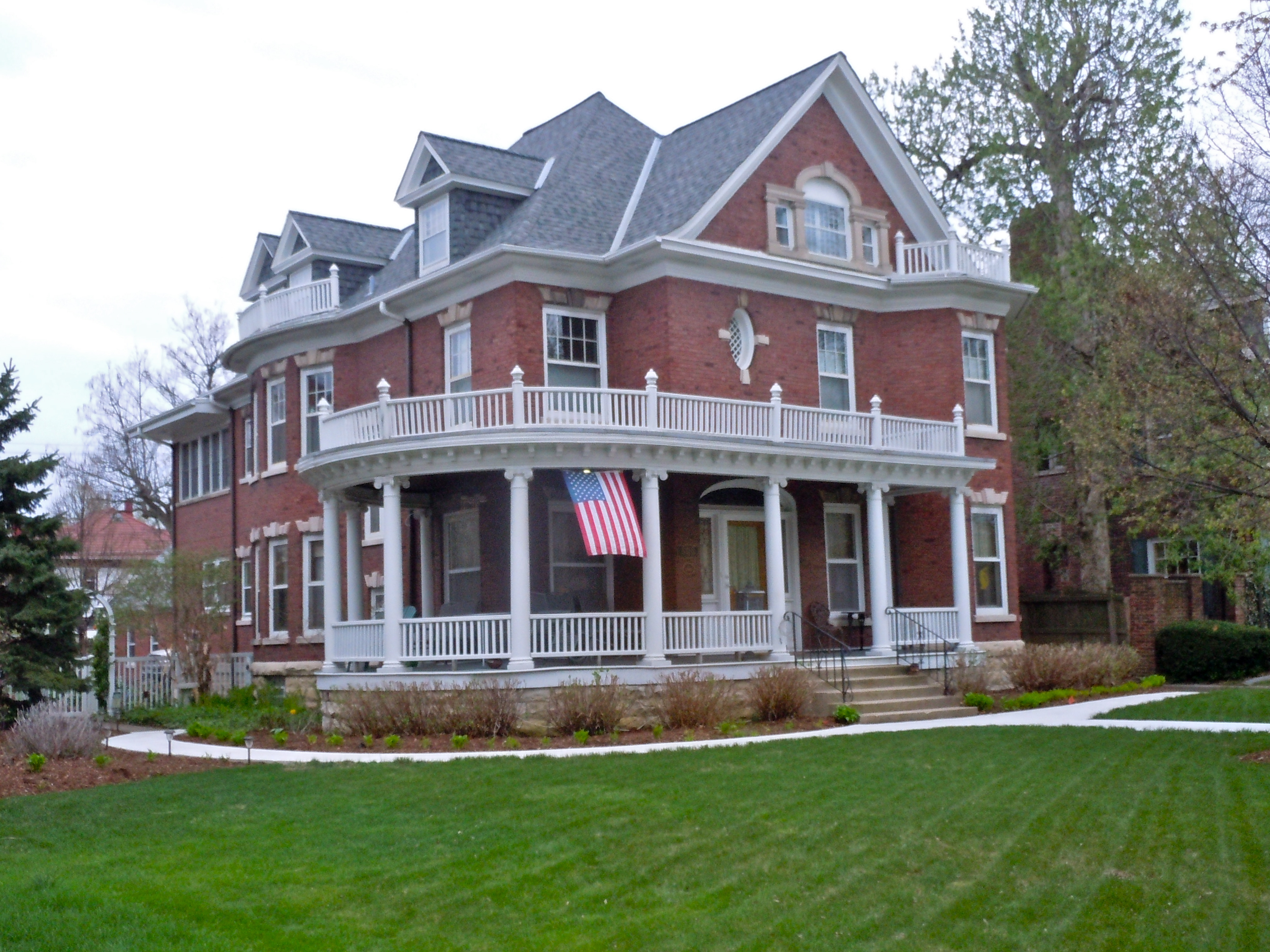

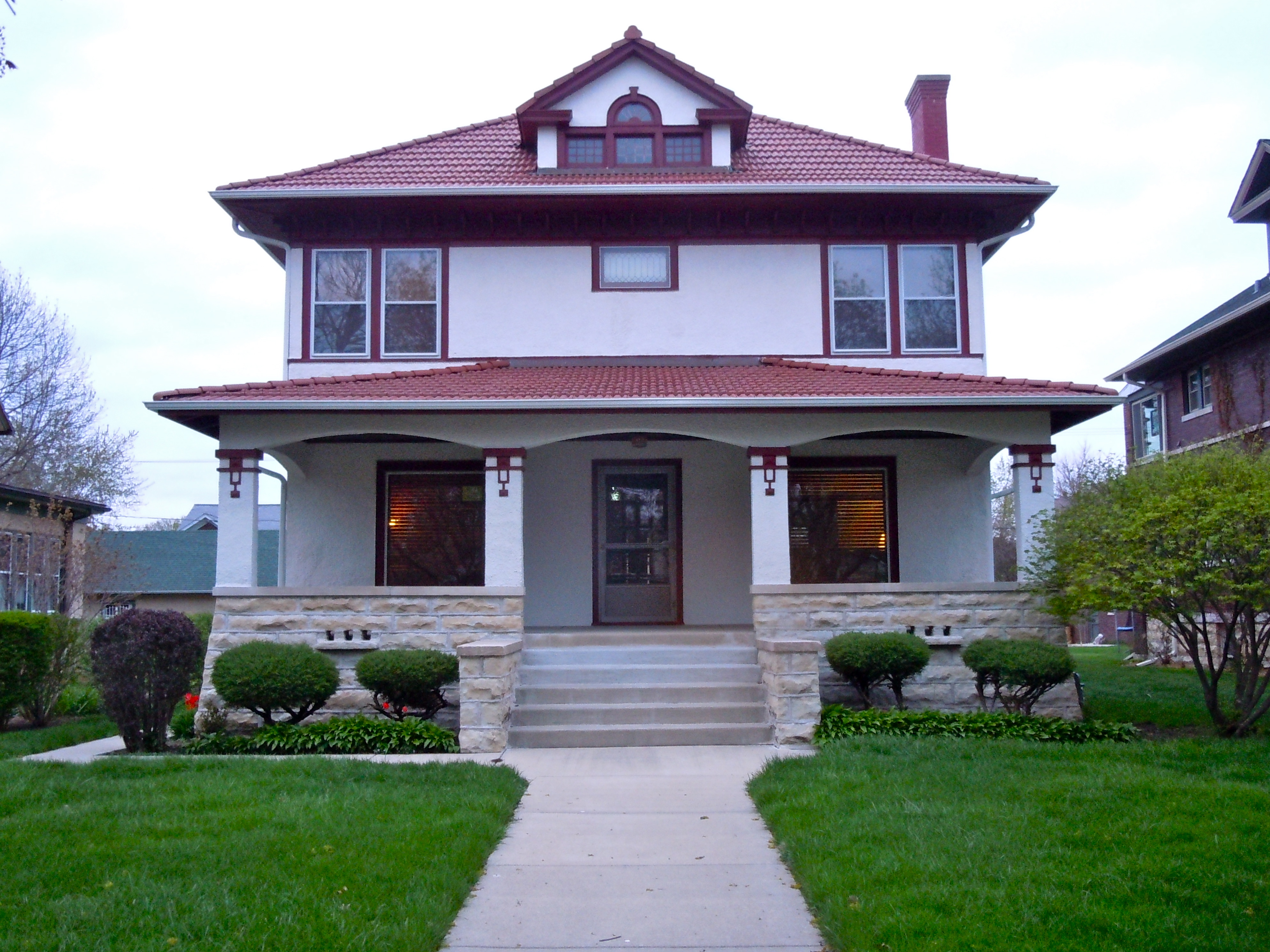

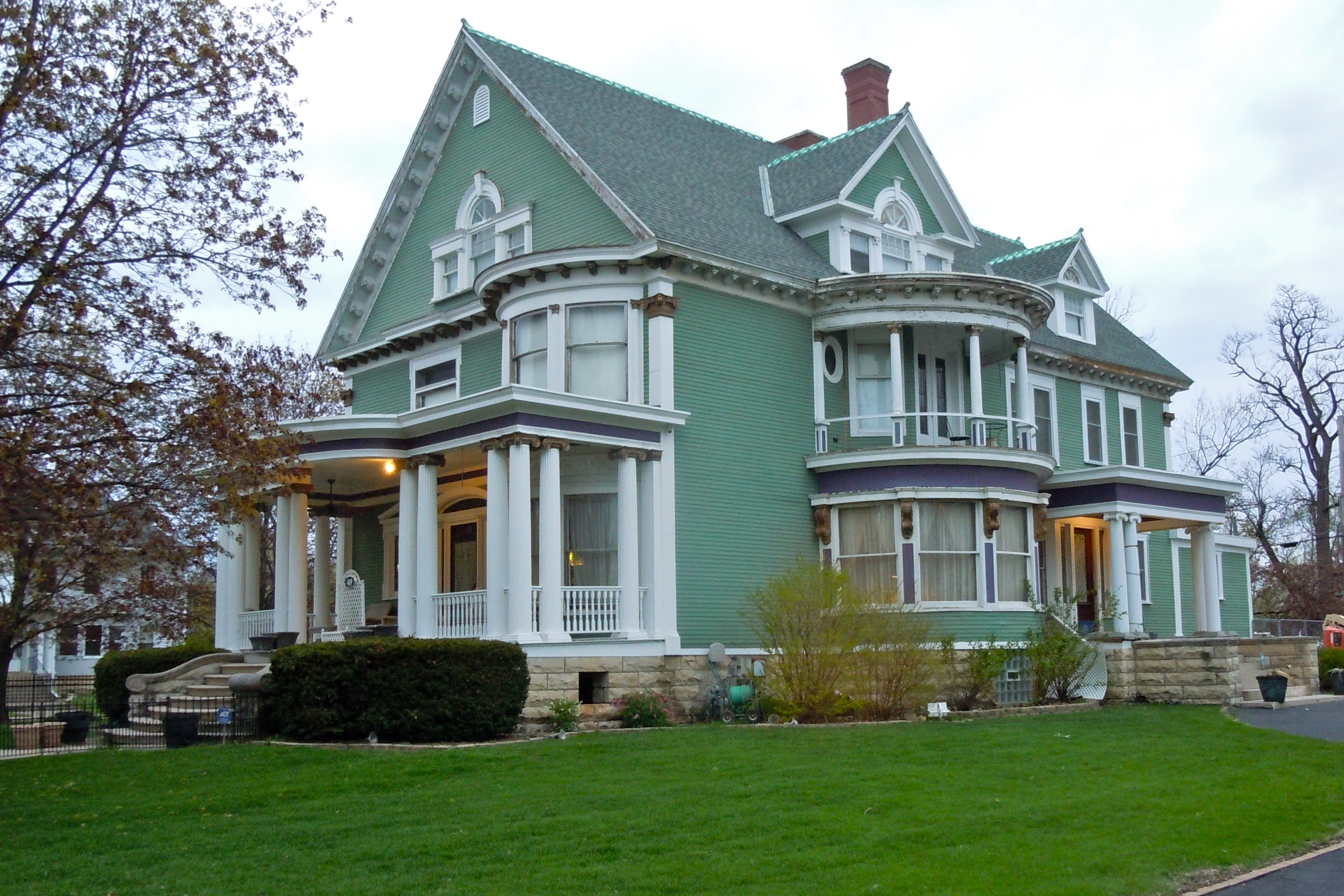
