= Joliet East Side Historic District =

Historic district in Illinois, United States

- U.S. National Register of Historic Places
- U.S. Historic district
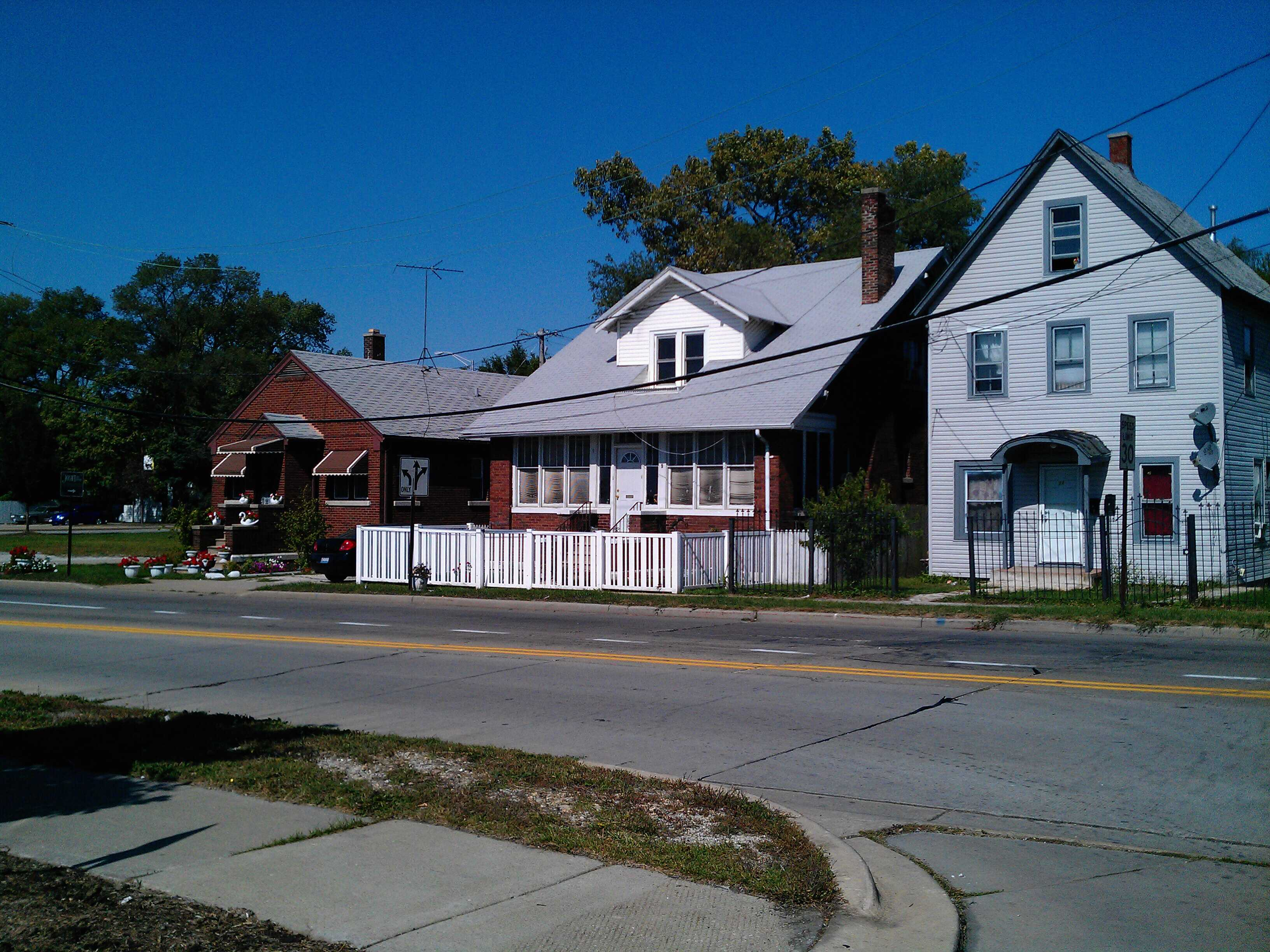

- Location within Illinois Location within the United States
- Location: Roughly bounded by Washington and Union Streets, 4th and Eastern Avenues; Joliet, Will County, Illinois, U.S.
- Coordinates: 41°31′8″N 88°4′28″W
- Architectural style: Late Victorian, Late 19th And 20th Century Revivals
- NRHP reference No.: 80001418
- Added to NRHP: August 15, 1980

The Joliet East Side Historic District is a set of 290 buildings in Joliet, Illinois. Of these 290 buildings, 281 contribute to the historical integrity of the area. Joliet was founded in 1831, deemed an ideal place for a settlement to reap the local natural resources. Most importantly, large beds of limestone provided a strong economic incentive to develop the area. Several important structures were constructed with Joliet limestone, including the Old State Capitol and Chicago Water Tower. Joliet incorporated in 1852 and prospered due to its location on the Illinois and Michigan Canal.

James B. Campbell platted the first East Side property in 1834 and named it Juliet. Two years later, Will County was formed and Juliet was chosen as the county seat. Citizens on the land renamed the area Joliet in 1845 after French explorer Louis Jolliet. Thirty-two houses were constructed on the East Side between 1852 and 1873. The area was sought after because of its proximity to the railway station. The first mayor of Joliet, Cornelius Van Horn, built his residence here in 1852. Van Horn's son William became a magnate in the Canadian railroad industry.

By 1873, the East Side had a reputation as the most prestigious in the city. The region was anchored by the Jacob A. Henry Mansion; Henry was a wealthy railroad tycoon. The first churches in the area, the Central Presbyterian Church and the Richards Street Methodist Church, were built soon afterward. Commerce flourished on Washington street after a row of commercial structures were constructed. However, the area was hit particularly hard by the Great Depression. Many mansions, including the Jacob A. Henry Mansion, were converted into boarding houses or funeral parlors. The east side failed to recover from the depression; remaining houses were converted into multiple-family homes or abandoned. The construction of Interstate 80 in the 1960s revitalized Washington Street, but did little for the residential areas. In 1975, Joliet financed a program to assist East Side home owners to rehabilitate their homes. The district was added to the National Register of Historic Places in 1980.

== Selected structures of significance ==
Joliet selected fifty-one sites and structures of particular value to exemplify the historical merit of the district. Most of the records concerning the dates of the contributing buildings were lost in a fire in 1912.

- Commercial Row (1875–1886) - Late Victorian storefronts with Greek Revival and Italianate details. The stores originally hosted bakeries, hardware stores, and other important services.
- Fisher Home (built between 1887 and 1891) - Queen Anne residence
- Jacob A. Henry House (1871) - Second Empire and Italianate residence. The house was the most expensive in Will County at the time of its construction. It is listed separately on the National Register of Historic Places.
- Dr. Salter Homme (1887) - Second Empire residence with an Eastlake porch.
- Julius W. Folk Home (1873) - Vernacular residence with Greek Revival and Italianate details. It was the first home to Jacob A. Henry. Folk was a contractor for Henry's railroads and married into the family.
- Central Presbyterian Church (1895) - Gothic Revival church constructed with limestone donated by Jacob A. Henry.
- Akin Home (built before 1898) - Edward C. Akin was a founder of the Joliet Valparaiso Railroad Company. He later served at Illinois State Attorney, Illinois Attorney General, and mayor of Joliet. House has been altered with vinyl siding.
- Goodspeed Home (built before 1877) - Italianate residence
- G. Ducker Home (built between 1890 and 1896) - Unusual building with Ionic columns and Classical Revival elements. George Ducker founded the Ducker Dry Goods Store. His daughter married Robert Stanton Baum, second son of L. Frank Baum, author of The Wonderful Wizard of Oz.
- Heggie Home (built before 1898) - Italianate residence. James Heggie founded the Heggie Manufacturing Company, producing boilers. He later served as Joliet City Councilman.
- 105-107 Eastern Avenue (built before 1898) - Vernacular and Georgian Revival residence.
- Woodruff Home/Brown Lincoln Hotel (1905) - Originally the house of George Woodruff, who was President of the First National Bank. He abolished private banks in Illinois in 1911, and assisted U.S. Senators with composing the Federal Reserve Act. He also founded the Illinois State Chamber of Commerce. The residence was later converted into a hotel.
- Rubens Home (built before 1898) - Louis M. Rubens built several theaters in Joliet, including the Rubens Rialto Square Theater, the first in Illinois to show motion pictures with sound. The house is noted for its Prairie School influences.
- 205 Eastern Avenue (built before 1898) - Queen Anne residence.
- Phelps Home (built before 1873) - Italiante residence. Egbert Phelps was a U.S. Army veteran and attorney. He worked to establish the Joliet Public Library.
- Dr. Werner Home (built between 1890 and 1896) - Residence with Romanesque Revival features.
- Dibell Home (built before 1898) - Dorrence Dibell was a circuit court judge and later elected to the Illinois Appellate Court. The house was later sided.
- Snapp Home (built before 1873) - Henry Snapp was the United States Assessor and served on the Illinois Senate before being elected to the United States House of Representatives, where he served for one term (1871–1873).
- Dr. Dougall Home (built before 1877) - Queen Anne residence. Dougall was the Chief Surgeon of the Illinois and Michigan Canal Division. His office is now a museum in Lockport.
- 212 Eastern Avenue (built between 1898 and 1924) - Residence with Adam style and Georgian Revival elements.
- Barr Home (built before 1898) - Vernacular residence. George Barr was an attorney who practiced with his brother, Illinois Senator Richard Barr, and became one of the most successful practices in the state. George Barr also served as mayor of Joliet, State Attorney, and as a trustee for the University of Illinois
- Van Horn Home (1852) - Vernacular residence. Home to Cornelius Van Horne, the first mayor of Joliet, and William Cornelius Van Horne, who built the Canadian Pacific Railway through the Canadian Rockies.
- 303 Richards (built before 1898) - Georgian Revival residence with Ionic columns
- 121 Union (built before 1898) - Vernacular residence
- Barber Home (built before 1898) - Queen Anne residence. William C. Barber was mayor of Joliet from 1915 to 1923.
- Bates Home (built before 1898) - Gothic Revival residence. William O. Bates founded the Bates Machine Company, which produced tracked vehicles.
- Maue Home (built before 1898) - Queen Anne, Gothic Revival, and Stick-Eastlake residence. August Maue was a school principal and author.
- 209 Bartleson (built before 1898) - Queen Anne residence
- A. J. Bates Home (built before 1898) - Residence of no particular style. Bates as an inventor who created the Bates Woven Wire Fence Machine for use in steel mills.
- G. Julian Barnes Home (1890) - Richardsonian Romanesque residence. Barnes was an architect who designed many Joliet homes, including his own.
- 320 Richards (built between 1910 and 1924) - Mission Revival Style residence
- King Home (1889) - Substantially altered Queen Anne residence. J. P. King was a California Gold Rush prospector who later operated a lumber business.
- M. Calmer Home (built before 1887) - Italianate residence with Greek Revival elements designed by James Weese. Michael Calmer was a dry goods merchant and later president of the Will County National Banka and Joliet Sheet Rolling Mill Co.
- Snapp Home (1898) - Georgian Revival residence designed by C. W. Webster. Howard M. Snapp served as a Republican in the United States House of Representatives from 1903 to 1911.
- Morrison Home (built between 1890 and 1896) - Altered Queen Anne residence. Robert J. Morrison was a colonel in the Civil War.
- Hill Home (built before 1877) - Italianate residence with Greek Revival features. Hill served as State Attorney.
- Washington Junior High School (1898) - Collegiate Gothic school designed by C. W. Webster
- 23 Eastern (c. 1859) - Altered Italianate residence with Greek Revival details.
- 110 Union (built before 1898) - Residence with Gothic Revival features.
- 208-210 Lincoln (built between 1900 and 1924) - Residence of no particular style
- Alpline Home (c. 1884) - Queen Anne residence
- 117-119 Eastern (built before 1898) - Vernacular residence with Italianate and Greek Revival details.
- 207 Eastern (built before 1898) - Queen Anne residence with Classical Revival elements
- Richards Street Methodist Church (1890) - Gothic and Romanesque Revival church designed by J. H. Barnes.
- 208-110 Osgood (built between 1898 and 1924) - Georgian Revival residence
- 216-218 Eastern (built between 1910 and 1924) - Spanish Colonial Revival residence
- 306 Union (built before 1898) - Vernacular residence with Italianate and Greek Revival elements
- Wagner Home (built before 1898) - Vernacular residence with Greek Revival elements
- 315 Sherman (built before 1898) - Queen Anne residence
- 308-310 Richards (built before 1898) - Queen Anne residence
