= Joliet Regional Airport =

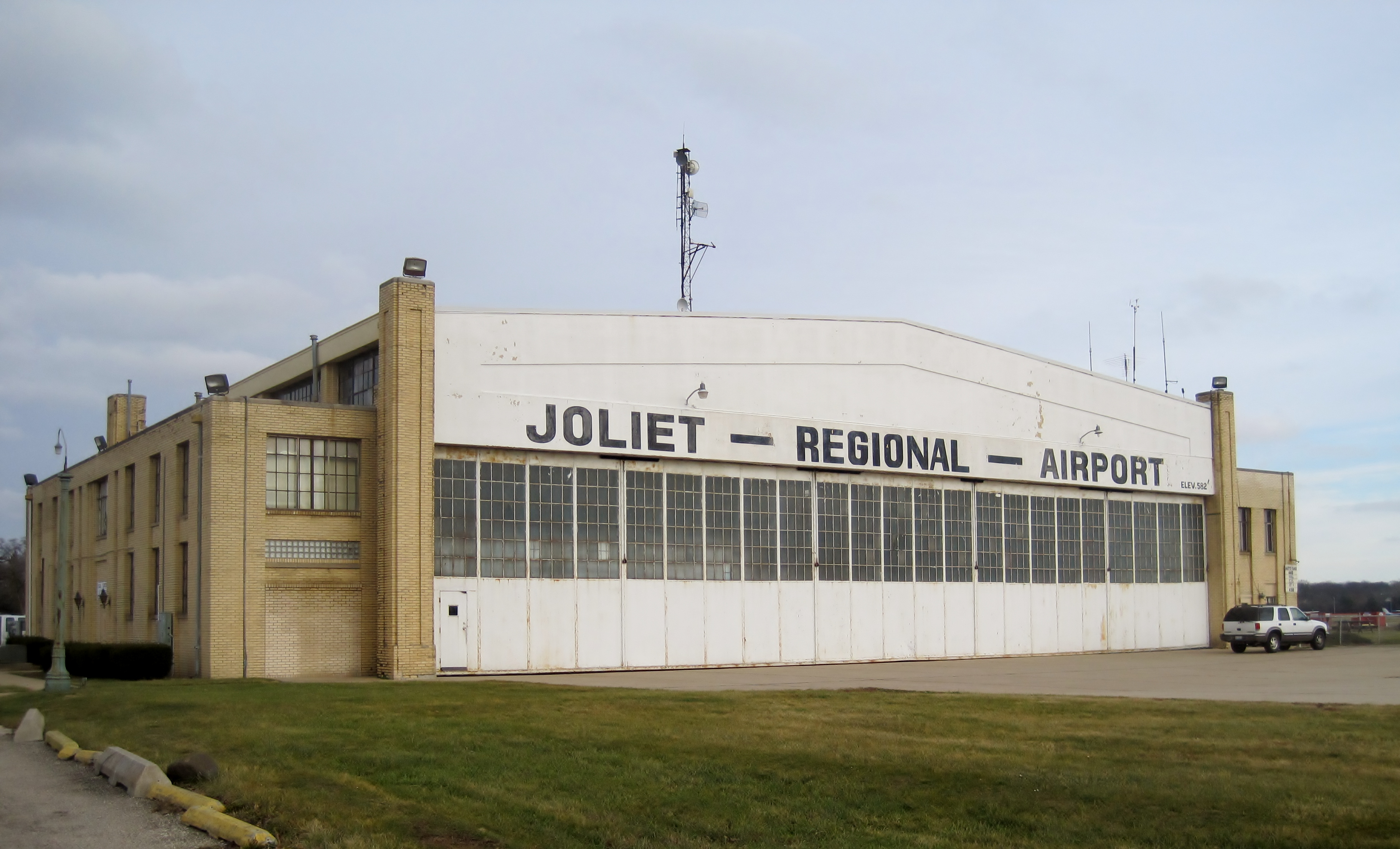
- IATA: JOT; ICAO: KJOT; FAA LID: JOT

Summary
- Airport type: Public
- Owner/Operator: Joliet Park District
- Serves: Joliet, Illinois
- Elevation AMSL: 582 ft (177 m)
- Coordinates: 41°31′04″N 088°10′32″W
- Website: Official site
- Interactive map of Joliet Regional Airport

Runways
Direction	Length		Surface
Direction	ft	m	Surface
12/30	2,937	895	Asphalt
4/22	2,746	837	Turf

Statistics (2019)
- Aircraft operations: 25,000
- Based aircraft: 114
- Sources: airport web site and FAA

- Joliet Park District Airport Hangar Building
- U.S. National Register of Historic Places
- Location within Illinois Location within the United States
- Location: Joliet, Illinois
- Coordinates: 41°31′04″N 88°10′32″W
- Built: 1930
- Architectural style: Art Deco with Streamline Moderne
- NRHP reference No.: 80001419
- Added to NRHP: 1980

Joliet Regional Airport (IATA: JOT, ICAO: KJOT, FAA LID: JOT) is a public use airport located four nautical miles (7 km) west of the central business district of Joliet, a city in Will County, Illinois, United States. It is owned by the Joliet Park District.

The airport is also 37 miles (60 kilometers) southwest of Chicago. It opened in April 1930.

== History ==
Joliet's first airport, Originally known as Joliet Municipal Airport, was proposed by Illinois Senator Richard Barr in the mid-1920s. It was operated by the Joliet Park District, the first airport in the country to be operated by such an authority. The land was purchased in September 1928, and the airport was built with assistance from the United States Department of Commerce. The airport was dedicated in September 1930, with an aerobatics show and bomb-dropping. The Park District relocated their main office to the airport.

Most operations were transferred to a new airfield in 1940. A transmitter is still functional at the old airport, and the hangar was added to the National Register of Historic Places in 1980.

== Facilities and aircraft ==
Joliet Regional Airport covers an area of 178 acres (72 ha) at an elevation of 581 feet (177 m) above mean sea level. It has two runways: 13/31 is 2,937 by 100 feet (895 x 30 m) with an asphalt pavement and 4/22 is 2,746 by 150 feet (837 x 45m) with a turf surface.

The airport has a fixed-base operator operated by the city. It offers line services like fuel and ground handling as well as a lounge, restroom, work stations, and a courtesy car.

For the 12-month period ending December 31, 2019, the airport had 25,000 aircraft operations, an average of 68 per day: 89% general aviation, 8% air taxi, and 3% military. At that time, there were 63 aircraft based at this airport, all airplanes: 62 single-engine and 1 multi-engine.

== Accidents & Incidents ==
- On February 16, 1975, four lawyers were killed when their plane crashed at Joliet.
- On July 1, 1976, a Piper Twin Comanche on a training flight crashed while attempting a go-around at Joliet. The airplane exceeded its performance capabilities and entered a stall, eventually spinning into the ground.
- On September 21, 2003, a Cessna 182 Skylane overran a runway at Joliet and impacted a ravine over the edge. The pilot made a statement that they started to lose electrical power 12 miles west of the airport and returned for an emergency landing. All electrical power was lost just under 10 miles from the airport. Further, the pilot reported that the engine did not respond to throttle inputs, and the pilot had to land without flaps. The pilot failed to obtain a proper touchdown point due to another plane taxiing onto the runway during his approach, and the probable cause of the accident was the pilot's decision not to perform a go-around and floating far down the runway. Contributing factors include an alternator failure, a complete loss of electrical power, and the ravine.
- On May 25, 2005, a Temco GC-1B crashed while taking off from Joliet when the pilot's seat moved aft, causing the pilot to lose control on the runway. The probable cause of the accident was found to be a malfunction of the pilot seat positioning mechanism for unknown reasons, resulting in loss of control of the aircraft.
- On January 1, 2009, a Lancair kit plane crashed after taking off from the airport. Two people on board were killed. The plane reportedly "took a hard left," flipped over, and crashed into a field.
- On July 21, 2016, a plane crashed into an empty house after taking off from Joliet. The sole pilot on board was killed. Witnesses report the engine sounded normal and that the plane entered a very sharp turn before going down.

== Ground transportation ==
Public transit service to the airport is provided by Pace.

== See also ==
- List of airports in Illinois
- Joliet station
