= Lewis University Airport =

- IATA: LOT; ICAO: KLOT; FAA LID: LOT

Summary
- Airport type: Public
- Owner/Operator: Joliet Regional Port Dist.
- Serves: Chicago, Romeoville, Illinois
- Location: Romeoville, Illinois
- Time zone: UTC−06:00 (-6)
  - Summer (DST): UTC−05:00 (-5)
- Elevation AMSL: 679 ft (207 m)
- Coordinates: 41°36′21″N 88°05′38″W
- Website: www.flylot.com

Map
- Location of airport in Illinois LOT (the United States)

Runways
Direction	Length		Surface
Direction	ft	m	Surface
2/20	6,500	1,981	Concrete
9/27	5,500	1,676	Asphalt

Statistics (2022)
- Aircraft operations: 104,000
- Based aircraft: 129
- Source: FAA and airport website

Lewis University Airport (IATA: LOT, ICAO: KLOT, FAA LID: LOT) is a public use airport located 20 miles (32 km) southwest of Chicago, adjacent to Lewis University in the village of Romeoville in Will County, Illinois, United States. The Joliet Regional Port District assumed ownership of the airport in 1989. The National Weather Service Chicago, Illinois (Chicago Forecast Office) is adjacent to the airport.

== History ==
Lewis University Airport was the original base for Clarence A. "Clancy" Hess's operation "Wings of Hope".

The airport has had numerous upgrades in recent years, including widening and reconstructing of taxiways, updating airport lights, construction of a control tower, and renovation of ramps. With construction of the control tower, the airport hopes to attract more business aviation and more business jets to be based at Lewis University Airport.

The airport's new control tower was completed in November 2022, and the tower opened on December 29 of that year. The project was supported by the Rebuild Illinois program, which was an economic bill sponsored by the State of Illinois to help recover from the Coronavirus pandemic. The state covered 75% of the $8 million project.

== Facilities and aircraft ==
Lewis University Airport covers an area of 1,000 acres (400 ha) which contains two runways:

- Runway 2/20: 6,500 x 100 ft (1,981 x 30 m), surface: concrete
- Runway 9/27: 5,500 x 75 ft (1,676 x 23 m), surface: asphalt

For 12-month period ending July 31, 2022, the airport had 104,000 aircraft operations, an average of 285 per day: 96% general aviation and 4% air taxi. For the same time period, there were 129 aircraft based at this airport: 107 single-engine and 11 multi-engine airplanes, 7 jet airplanes, and 4 helicopters.

== Accidents and incidents ==
- On July 14, 1989, three people were killed when a Cessna 177 Cardinal crashed into a factory shortly after takeoff from Lewis. The engine reportedly was running but developing little power. All three aboard died, and two people on the ground were injured.
- On June 26, 2011, a Cessna 210 crashed while attempting to land at Lewis. Witnesses said the plane appeared to be having troubles and wanted to divert to Lewis. The aircraft impacted power lines, and crashed, killing one passenger and seriously wounding another.
- On May 13, 2021, the pilot of a Beechcraft B24R Sierra 200 reported that engine speed "suddenly dipped down" on climbout after takeoff from Lewis. Attempts to restore power were unsuccessful, and the plane landed on a nearby highway.

== Ground transportation ==
While no public transit service is provided directly to the airport, Pace provides bus service nearby.

== See also ==
- List of airports in Illinois
- Lewis University
- Romeoville station
