= Rialto Square Theatre =

Theater in Joliet, Illinois, U.S.

Coordinates: 41°31′33.52″N 88°4′52.88″W

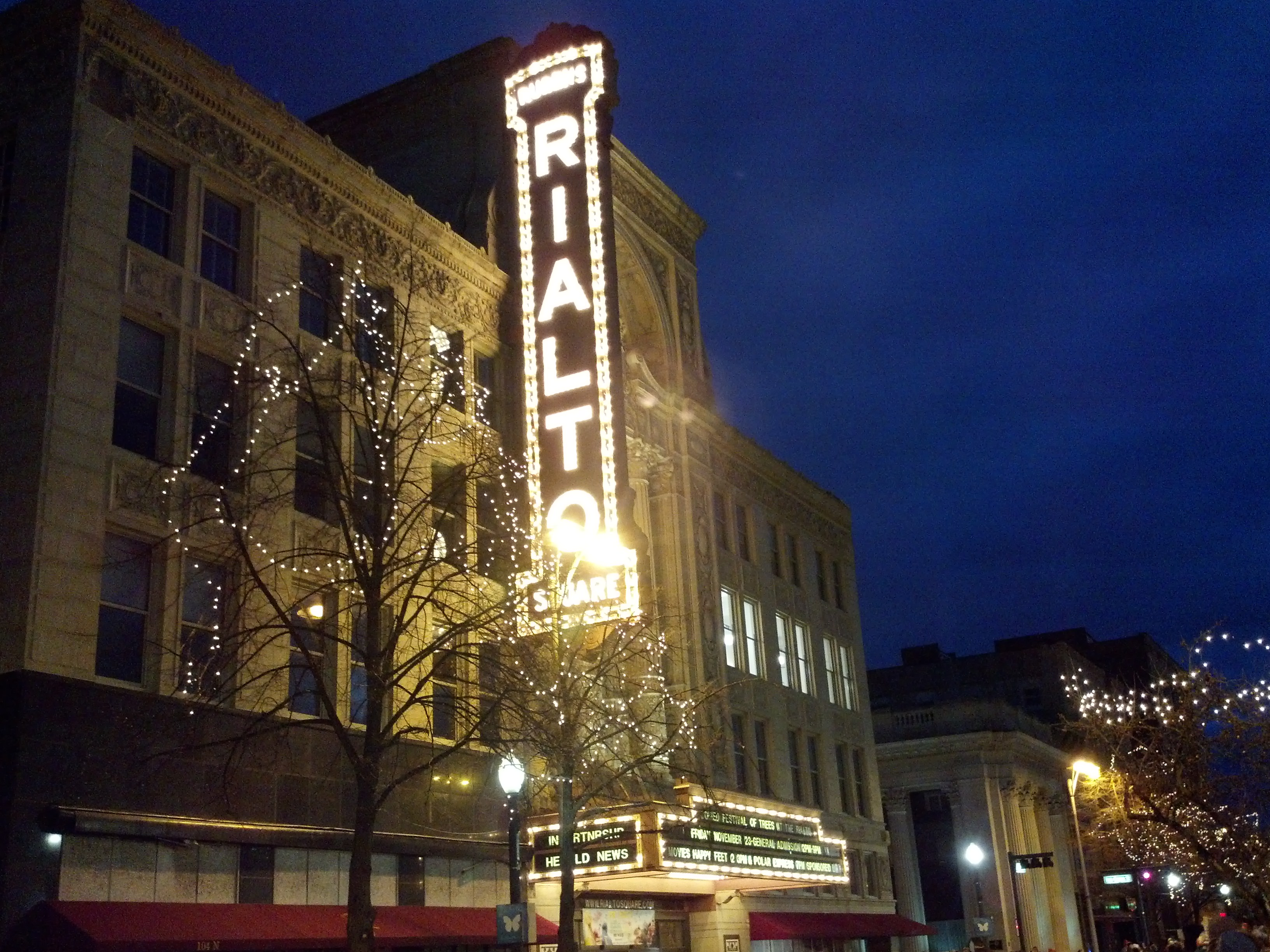
- Interactive map of Rialto Square Theatre
- Address: 102 N. Chicago St
- Location: Joliet, Illinois
- Owner: Will County Metropolitan Exposition & Auditorium Authority
- Operator: VenuWorks
- Capacity: 1,966
- Type: Movie palace

Construction
- Built: 1926
- Renovated: 1978
- Architect: Rapp & Rapp
- General contractor: Kaiser-Ducett

Website
- Venue Website
- Rubens Rialto Square Theater
- U.S. National Register of Historic Places
- NRHP reference No.: 78001199
- Added to NRHP: July 24, 1978

The Rialto Square Theatre is a theater in Joliet, Illinois (U.S.). Opening in 1926, it was originally designed and operated as a vaudeville movie palace, but it now houses mainly musicals, plays, concerts, and standup comedy. It is also available for public and private functions. Designed in the Neo-Baroque style, it is considered one of "150 great places in Illinois" by the American Institute of Architects.

== Description ==
Inside Rialto Square Theatre, which opened in 1926 and underwent a restoration in the 1980s, shining scagliola columns rise into a celestial dome full of intricate sculptures. A Duchess chandelier dominates the rotunda. Cream-colored marble walls line the lobby and cherubim flutter into the auditorium. The lobby's marble walls were polished by Conrad Schmitt Studios, the same company that did major restoration work at the Rialto in 1980. The black marble base on the walls of the esplanade, fashioned after the Hall of Mirrors in the Palace of Versailles in France, has been polished, as has the elegant red, pink and gray scagliola above the base.

C.W. and George Rapp designed the Rialto Square Theatre in 1924, and the theatre opened May 24, 1926, featuring the production "The Evolution of Joliet". The first talking picture at the Rialto was shown on October 9, 1928, with Lights of New York. In 1953 stereophonic sound was installed in the theatre.

As one of the theatre's original purposes was to exhibit silent films, which typically required musical accompaniment and sound effects, a four manual, 28 rank Barton theatre organ was included in the building's design, with the pipework installed into two chambers that flank the stage. The organ's console is mounted on a movable platform that can be raised to stage level or lowered into the orchestra pit. This instrument underwent an extensive restoration and is the focal point of the organ extravaganza concert held each year in the spring.

In 1972, a campaign to "Save the Rialto" was initiated and led by Miss Dorothy Mavrich. As the campaign became more organized the group became known as the Rialto Square Arts Association. Assisted by local businessman Christo Dragatsis, Miss Maverich began to garner support from City, State, and Federal Officials. In the meantime, a student campaign began at a local High School, Joliet Township High School East Campus, under the direction of ROTC Cadet Lt. Colonel Don Probst who joined with Miss Mavrich in starting preliminary work towards the restoration. Mr. Probst helped organize student volunteers to repaint dressing rooms, clean the theatre, and act as ushers for some of the initial shows before major restoration began. Among these were "Hasting and Hays On Love" featuring soap opera stars Don Hastings and Kathryn Hays, presented at the 51st Anniversary Celebration held July 30 and July 31, 1977. It was at this time that The Rialto stage featured the choirs and Swing Groups from East, Central, and West Campuses as a joint tribute to the restoration and return to live stage productions.

In 1978 the Rialto complex became public property and the Joliet Metropolitan Exposition and Auditorium Authority was established to provide leadership for the impending restoration of the theatre property.

The Will County Cultural Arts Association, which sponsored the "Hastings and Hays on Love" concert was headed by President Dorothy Mavrich, 1st Vice President Eugene Gaskin, 2nd Vice President Dan Curtin, Secretary Sue Curtin, and Treasurer Dorothy Gross. The Board of Directors included Hal Carlson, Jan Challander, Marge Challander, Dan Cyrtin, Sue Curtin, Eugene Gaskin, Delores Gross, Matthew Gross, Chet Kondratowicz, Andrea Magosky, Brenda Merchant, Dorothy Mavrich, Robert Myers, Sue Revels, Bro. David O.F.M., Bob Russ, Rosemarie Sandenwater, Claudette Soltis, Richard Teas, Diane Wurzinger, and Vivian Ziech. Association Affiliates were Rob Calcaterra, Paul Lockwood, and Don Probst.

The Rialto was the place where Christopher Knight and Adrianne Curry held their wedding reception in the final episode of My Fair Brady.

The theatre used to be home to the Rialto School of the Arts, an art, choir, and drama educational program for children. A Visual Arts Camp explored different media, tools, and techniques. Additionally, A Choir camp was offered giving kids a chance to sing and dance, with a final performance on the magnificent Rialto Square Theatre stage. Children's Theatre Workshops were also held at the Rialto by Our Town Productions, a professional theatre company based out of Downers Grove, IL.
