= Joliet Regional Port District =

Coordinates: 41°36′18″N 88°05′31″W

The Joliet Regional Port District is a special-purpose district in Will County, Illinois. The District includes all territory in DuPage, Lockport, Joliet, Troy, and Channahon townships and operates Lewis University Airport.
