= List of Midwestern cities by size =

The following table lists all of the cities in the Midwestern United States with at least 100,000 people in the 2020 census. These numbers were taken directly from the United States Census Bureau. Note that only people living in the city itself are counted. People living in suburbs are not included.

There are a total of fifty cities in this list, the largest of which is Chicago with more than two million people. All twelve states in the Midwest are represented. Illinois and Michigan appear most often (eight times each) while North Dakota and South Dakota each appear just once under Fargo and Sioux Falls.

City	State	Census Population		Change
City	State	2010	2020	Change
Chicago	Illinois	2,695,598	2,746,388	+1.9%
Columbus	Ohio	787,033	905,748	+15.1%
Indianapolis	Indiana	820,445	887,642	+8.2%
Detroit	Michigan	713,777	639,111	−10.5%
Milwaukee	Wisconsin	594,833	577,222	−3.0%
Kansas City	Missouri	459,787	508,090	+10.5%
Omaha	Nebraska	408,958	486,051	+18.9%
Minneapolis	Minnesota	382,578	429,954	+12.4%
Wichita	Kansas	382,368	397,532	+4.0%
Cleveland	Ohio	396,815	372,624	−6.1%
Saint Paul	Minnesota	285,068	311,527	+9.3%
Cincinnati	Ohio	296,943	309,317	+4.2%
St. Louis	Missouri	319,294	301,578	−5.5%
Lincoln	Nebraska	258,379	291,082	+12.7%
Toledo	Ohio	287,208	270,871	−5.7%
Madison	Wisconsin	233,209	269,840	+15.7%
Fort Wayne	Indiana	253,691	263,886	+4.0%
Des Moines	Iowa	203,433	214,133	+5.3%
Grand Rapids	Michigan	188,040	198,917	+5.8%
Overland Park	Kansas	173,372	197,238	+13.8%
Sioux Falls	South Dakota	153,888	192,517	+25.1%
Akron	Ohio	199,110	190,469	−4.3%
Aurora	Illinois	197,899	180,542	−8.8%
Springfield	Missouri	159,498	169,176	+6.1%
Kansas City	Kansas	145,786	156,607	+7.4%
Joliet	Illinois	147,433	150,362	+2.0%
Naperville	Illinois	141,853	149,540	+5.4%
Rockford	Illinois	152,871	148,655	−2.8%
Olathe	Kansas	125,872	141,290	+12.2%
Warren	Michigan	134,056	139,387	+4.0%
Cedar Rapids	Iowa	126,326	137,710	+9.0%
Dayton	Ohio	141,527	137,644	−2.7%
Sterling Heights	Michigan	129,699	134,346	+3.6%
Topeka	Kansas	127,473	126,587	−0.7%
Columbia	Missouri	108,500	126,254	+16.4%
Fargo	North Dakota	105,549	125,990	+19.4%
Ann Arbor	Michigan	113,934	123,851	+8.7%
Independence	Missouri	116,830	123,011	+5.3%
Rochester	Minnesota	106,769	121,395	+13.7%
Evansville	Indiana	117,429	117,298	−0.1%
Elgin	Illinois	108,188	114,797	+6.1%
Springfield	Illinois	116,250	114,394	−1.6%
Peoria	Illinois	115,007	113,150	−1.6%
Lansing	Michigan	114,297	112,644	−1.4%
Dearborn	Michigan	98,153	109,976	+12.0%
Green Bay	Wisconsin	104,057	107,395	+3.2%
South Bend	Indiana	101,168	103,453	+2.3%
Davenport	Iowa	99,685	101,724	+2.0%
Lee's Summit	Missouri	91,364	101,108	+10.7%
Clinton Township	Michigan	96,796	100,513	+3.8%
