= List of muffler men =

Muffler men are large molded fiberglass sculptures that are placed as advertising icons, roadside attractions, or for decorative purposes, predominantly in the United States. They are often used to display mufflers, tires, or other products to advertise local businesses.

== Arizona ==
- Two Louie the Lumberjacks at Northern Arizona University in Flagstaff - one inside J. Lawrence Walkup Skydome and one outside
- Paul Bunyan at Leo's Auto and Home Supply/Don's Hot Rod Shop in Tucson
- Big Ed at Cumming's Plumbing in Tucson. Originally Stamper Miner in Rapid City, South Dakota, he moved to Tucson and was refurbished in December 2015.
- Big Johnson (B.J.) at Big Johnson's Store in Prescott

== Arkansas ==
- "Lee the Tow Man", custom-built for Driven Towing and Recovery in Hot Springs.
- "Big John", Driven Towing and Recovery, Hot Springs. This muffler man was originally in St. George, Utah from 1964 to 2001. It was transported to Cheshire, Connecticut, then to Bache, Oklahoma in 2019, before being brought to Hot Springs in 2022.
- "Muffler Mr. Spock", Driven Towing and Recovery, Hot Springs. Depicts Spock from Star Trek.

== California ==
- "Willy Willits," Willits Frontier Days Rodeo Grounds, Willits, CA
- "Big Bert", River Bend Resort, Forestville.
- "Big Josh" in Joshua Tree (formerly "Mecca Man" at El Tompa Mini Mart in Mecca).

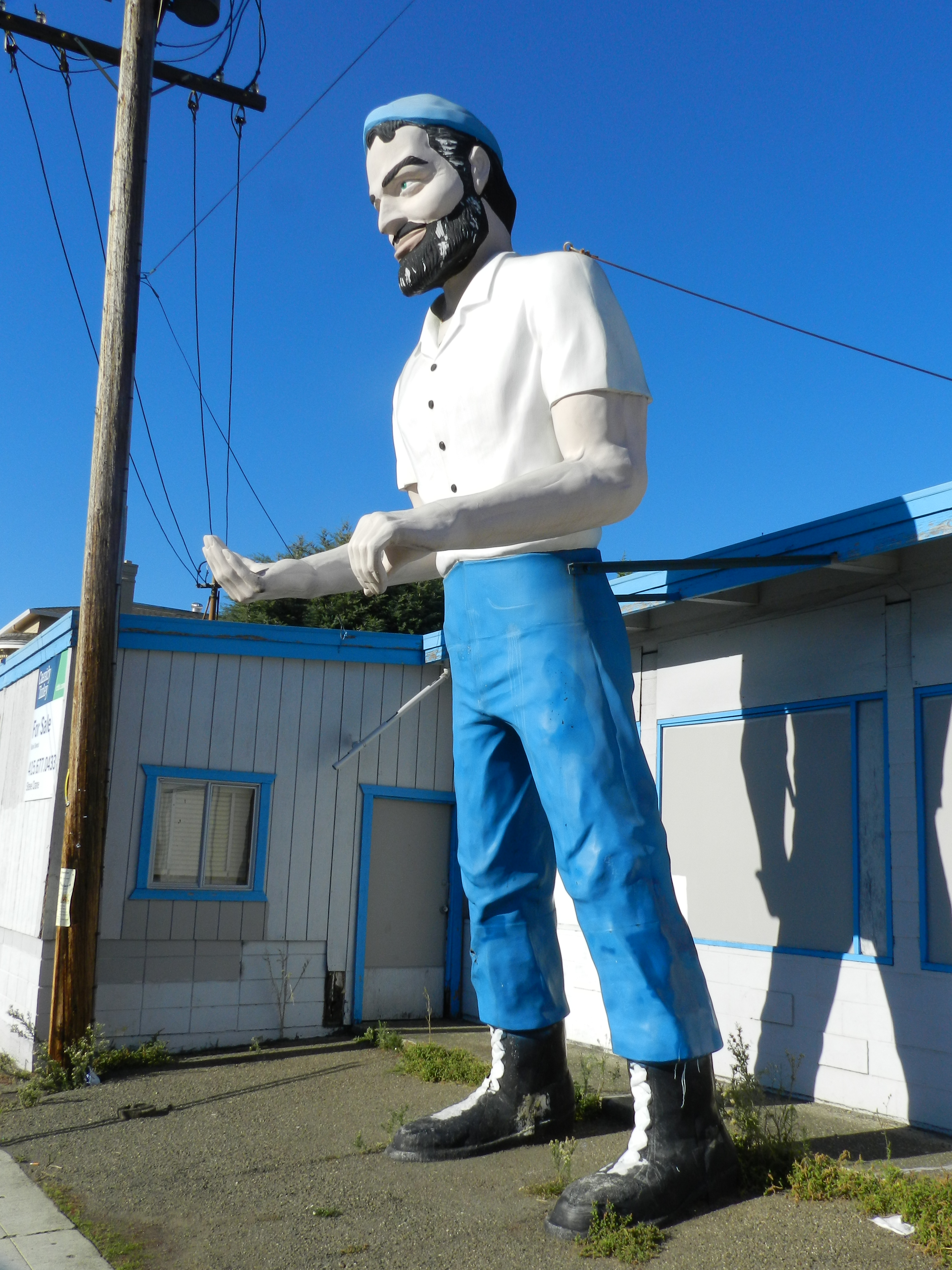
Big Mike, Hayward, California

- "Big Mike", formerly at Big Mike's Muffler, Hayward.
- "Babe Royer" at Babe's Lightning & Muffler in San Jose.
- "Chicken Boy" in Highland Park.
- "El Salsero" muffler man at 22800 Pacific Coast Highway, Malibu
- "Edwin", a golfer, at El Monte Sign Company, 2710 Santa Anita Avenue, El Monte.
- "The Big Man", originally a lumberjack with axe at the intersection of highways 88 and 104 (Lower Ridge Road), in Martell.
- "The Guy," a race car driver holding a checkered flag, off the 405 freeway, at the west coast Porsche Experience Center in Carson. Originally a golfer for the Dominguez Golf Course.
- Unnamed, King's Auto Repair in Compton.
- "Sergio," at Automotive Alley in Boyle Heights.
- "Tony" at Tony's Transmissions in City Terrace.
- "Kevin" at Tuneup Masters in Van Nuys.
- "Joor Muffler Man" at Joor Muffler in Escondido.
- "The Indian Warrior" at Ethel's Old Corral Cafe in Bakersfield.
- "Rodeo Man" in Livermore.

== Colorado ==
- "Trailer Park Cowboy" at Rustic Ranch Mobile Home Park, 5565 Federal Blvd., Denver.
- "Ranch Cowboy" stands guard with a pitchfork at Lazy T Ranch, 12765 N. 63rd St., Longmont.
- "Greeley Muffler Man" in front of Just Bob's Auto, 500 1st Ave, Greeley.

== Connecticut ==
- When the 26-foot "Muffler Man" Paul Bunyan was erected in front of a Cheshire lumber business in the 1980s, the town objected to the statue, citing that it was a violation of town codes given its substantial height. Finding no limitation on flagpole height on the books, the owners of the statue replaced Bunyan's axe with an American flag.
- "Big Bob", Norwich. A cowboy muffler man with an American flag and cowboy hat that has been in Norwich since the mid-1960s. For his first 20 years he was on the other side of town. Previously belonged to amusement park owner Alex Cohen. The owners of Surplus Unlimited bought Big Bob in 1982.

== Florida ==
- In front of CSD Truck Repairs in Palm River-Clair Mel
- In front of Aufo Air Muffler & Brake City in Dade City

== Kansas ==
- Muffler Man in front of Brown's Tire in Wichita.
- Big A at Gearhead Curios in Galena.

== Indiana ==
- Paul Bunyan, MacAllister Rental outside of Muncie. The Paul Bunyan stands outside the main building, facing towards Interstate 69.
- "Mr. Bendo", Ralph's Muffler shop in Indianapolis.
- Frank-N-Stein a similar giant to the Muffler Men but designed by a noted Muncie, Indiana Artist. This artist also designed the Paul Bunyan at MacAllister Rental. It was displayed in Lake County, Indiana from 1967 to 1982.

== Idaho ==
- The World's Largest Janitor, "Big Don", at the Museum of Clean in Pocatello.
- The "lumberjack" at Heyburn Elementary School in St. Maries.

== Illinois ==
- Gemini Giant in Wilmington
- A Giant Hot Dog Statue on Route 66 in Atlanta, Illinois was relocated from Bunyon's in Cicero upon that restaurateur's retirement.
- Lauterbach Man at Lauterbach Service Center in Springfield
- Spartan at Southeast High School in Springfield.
- BIG FAT in Evergreen Park, Paul Bunyan statue on top of Guardian Auto Re-builders.
- Blind Without Glasses at 6300 S. Pulaski in Chicago, Indian on top of an eye clinic.
- Paul Bunyan at Lamb's Farm in Libertyville.
- Two muffler men, Paul Bunyan and Beach Boy, at the Pink Elephant Antique Mall in Livingston.
- Stogie Man at Cigars and Stripes in Berwyn.
- "Carl" holds a vanilla cone & burger outside of the College Ave location of Carl's Ice Cream Factory in Normal

== Iowa ==
- Giant "Phil", Williamsburg. A Phillips 66 Cowboy, Muffler Man, once stood at the Landmark Truck Stop in Williamsburg, at the intersection of I-80 and IA-149. It appears on a vintage postcard and possibly now stands with a large fiberglass bull in Waukon.

== Louisiana ==
- In front of Topps Western World, 3003 Topps Trail, Bossier City (facing I-20, near exit 23).

== Maine ==
- Paul Bunyan and Babe the Blue Ox in J. Eugene Boivin Park, Rumford.

== Maryland ==
Paul Bunyan aka Uncle Harve. Located at the Anne Arundel County Fairgrounds in Crownsville, Md

== Massachusetts ==
- Plantation Man, East Longmeadow. It was originally made for a restaurant in Framingham, then as Uncle Sam for a car dealership in Springfield before being moved to another car dealership in Chicopee.
- There is a Muffler Man with a large ax and lumberman's hard hat at the entrance to Valley Tree Service on the east side of Route 97 in Groveland.
- A muffler man depicted in rural attire and baseball cap stands at Green Valley Equipment Company, on Route 43 in Hancock.

== Michigan ==
- Greg E. Normous: Golfer, stands at a putt putt golf course, named for Greg Norman, 23 Mile Road, New Baltimore.
- Golf Giant: Golfer at driving range, 1/2 mile west of Greg E. Normous, New Baltimore.
- Manistique: Paul Bunyan statue at Manistique Chamber of Commerce Visitor Center.

== Mississippi ==
- Muffler Man (Held two bags of "groceries" at Giant Food Stores, painted as a clerk in the 1960s) now at Boom City Fireworks, 9199 HY 61, Walls.

== Missouri ==
- Bunyan (a Mr. Bendo): Stones Last Resort, Cleveland.
- Bunyan (no job too big): Skyline Motors Tractor Trailer Repair, Foristell.
- Injun Joe and Country Bumpkin: Bagnell Dam Strip, Lake Ozark. (One was gone from 2013 until 2024 but suffered damage a few weeks after returning.)
- Muffler Man: Chief Wappalese: Chaonia Landing Resort and Marina, Lake Wappapello.
- Cowboy Muffler Man (in pieces): Croft Automotive and Trailer, Valley Park.
- Muffler Man (custom designed as a chef and erected in 2020) Route 66 Food-Truck Park (corner of St Louis St and Delaware Ave), Springfield.
- Mega Major: Opposite Uranus Fudge Factory, 14400 Hwy Z, St. Robert.

== Montana ==
- There is a muffler man in front of the tire store on Montana Avenue in Billings.

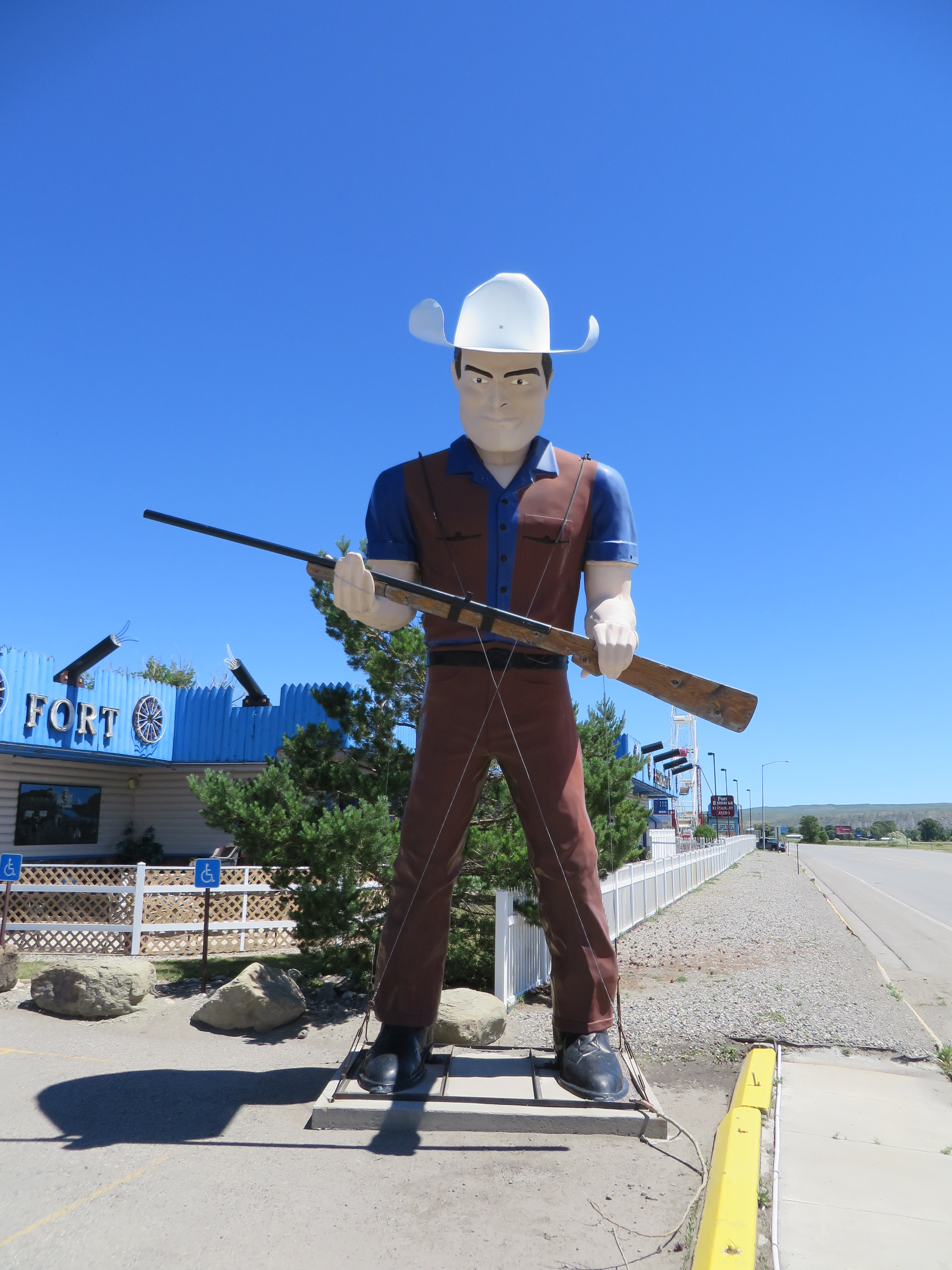
Casino Dude

== Nebraska ==
- "Indian" in the stockade behind Fort Cody Trading Post has been a fixture along I-80 for decades at North Platte, exit 177.

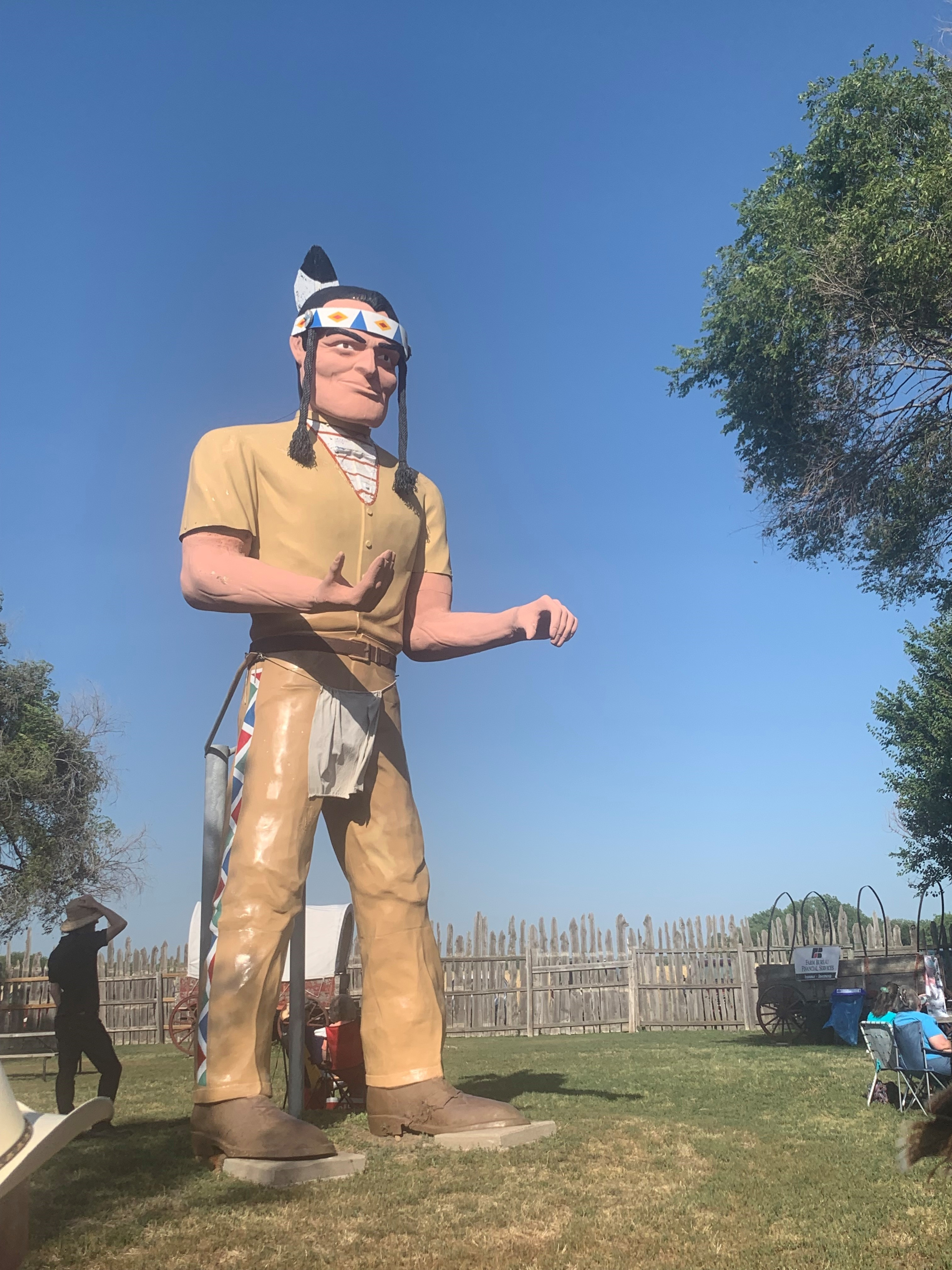
Fort Cody

== New Jersey ==
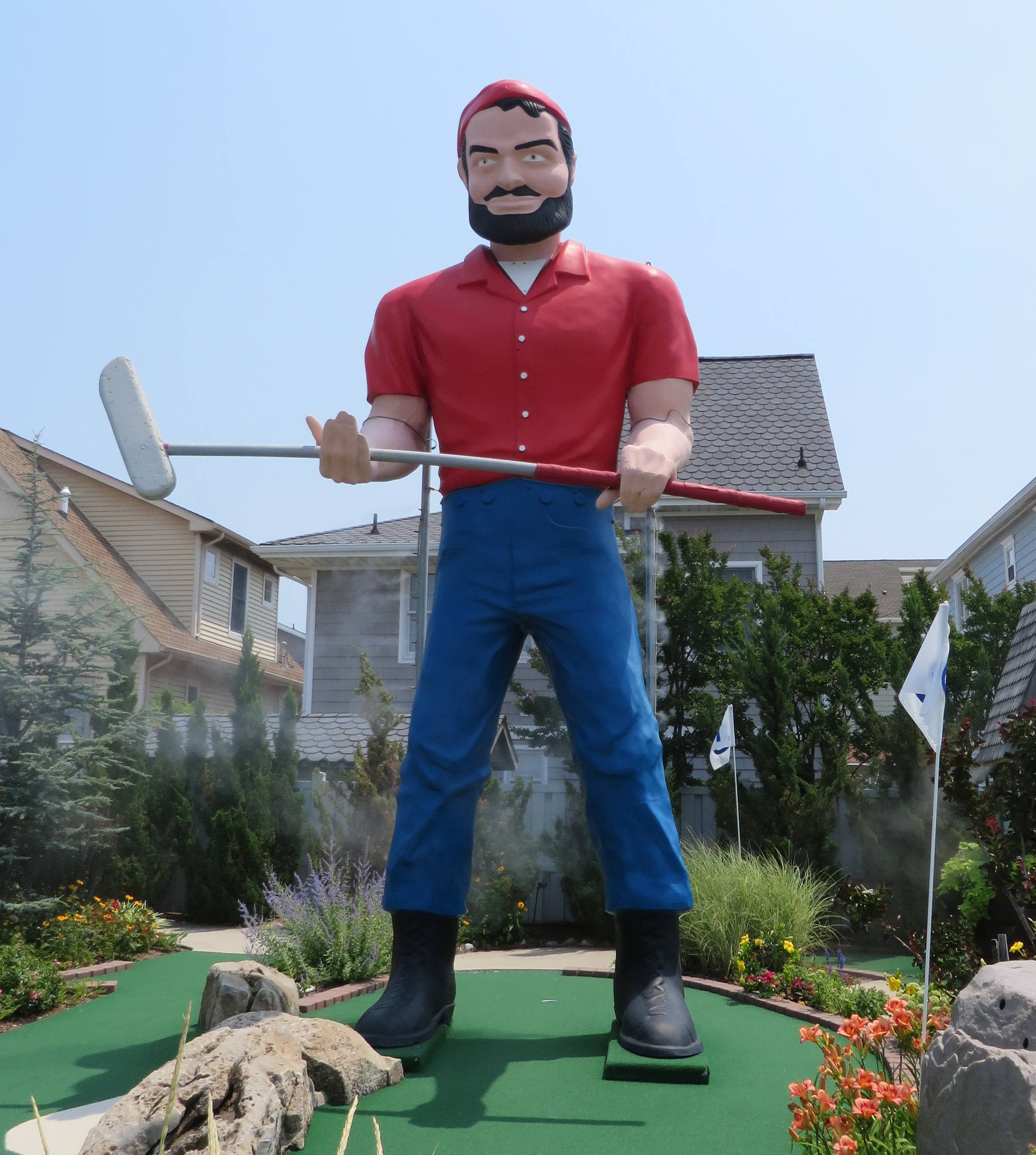
Barnacle Bill

- Nitro Girl, Black Horse Pike, Blackwood.
- Carpet Viking Statue, Route 77, Deerfield.
- Muffler man collection - Halfwit, Halfwit head paintball target, Dracula head, Monmoth Road, Holmeston.
- Carpet-clutching Muffler Man, Broadway, Jersey City.
- Tire Man in Pink, White Horse Pike, Magnolia.
- Pirate, Boardwalk, Ocean City.
- Barnacle Bill's Amusements, Highway 35, Ortley Beach.
- Muffler Man collection, Ocean Terrace, Seaside Heights.
- Happy Halfwit, Highway 73, Winslow.
- Cowtown Rodeo, Highway 40, Woodstown.

== New Mexico ==
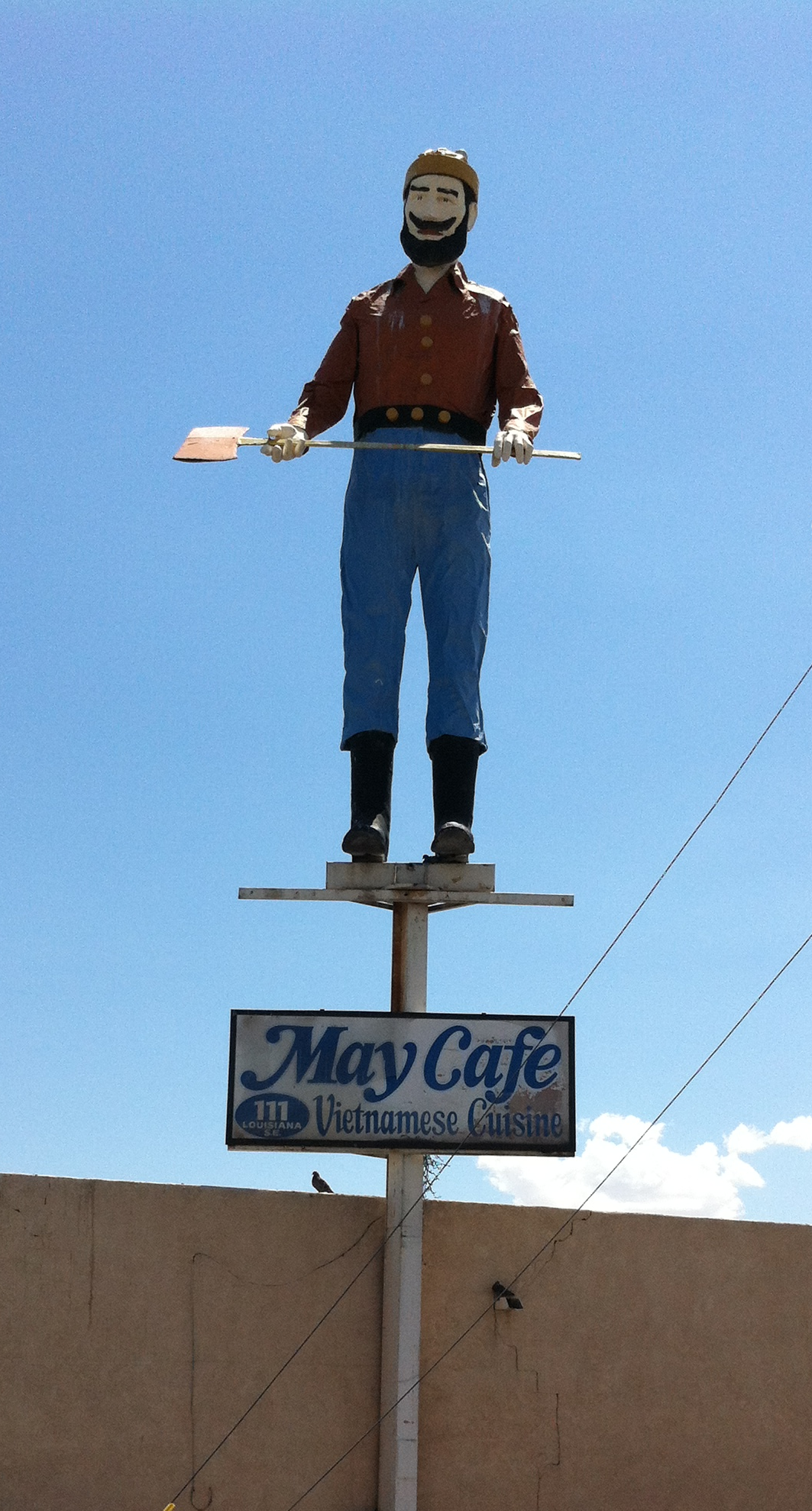
May Cafe

- Sun Glass, Farmington.
- Big Daddy's Flea Market, Las Cruces.
- Franciscan RV Inc., Hatch.
- Cowboy Muffler Man, John's Used Cars, Gallup.

== New York ==
- Gas station in Westchester County 135 N Saw Mill River Road, Elmsford (yellow shirt, green pants).
- Mountain Air Campground 1265 Lake Ave, Lake Luzerne (red shirt, blue pants).
- Camp Bullowa Boy Scout Camp, Rockland County (classic Paul Bunyan, red shirt with blue pants and ax).

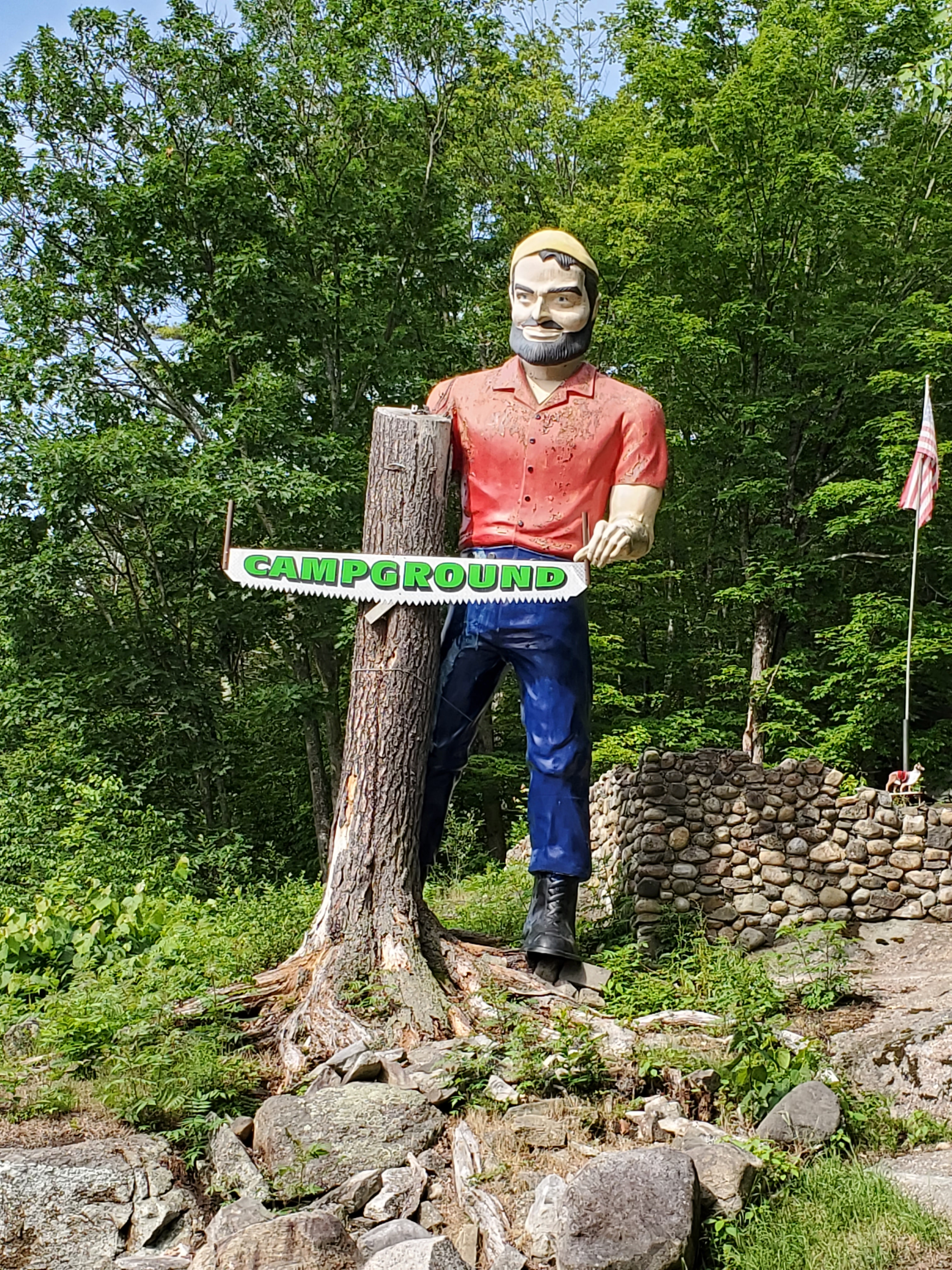
Muffler Man

- Riverhead Raceway 1797 Old Country Rd, Riverhead, NY 11901
- Around the World Miniature Golf, 58 Beach Rd, Lake George, NY

== North Carolina ==
- Bradsher Landscape Supply, Raleigh (blue jeans and baseball cap).

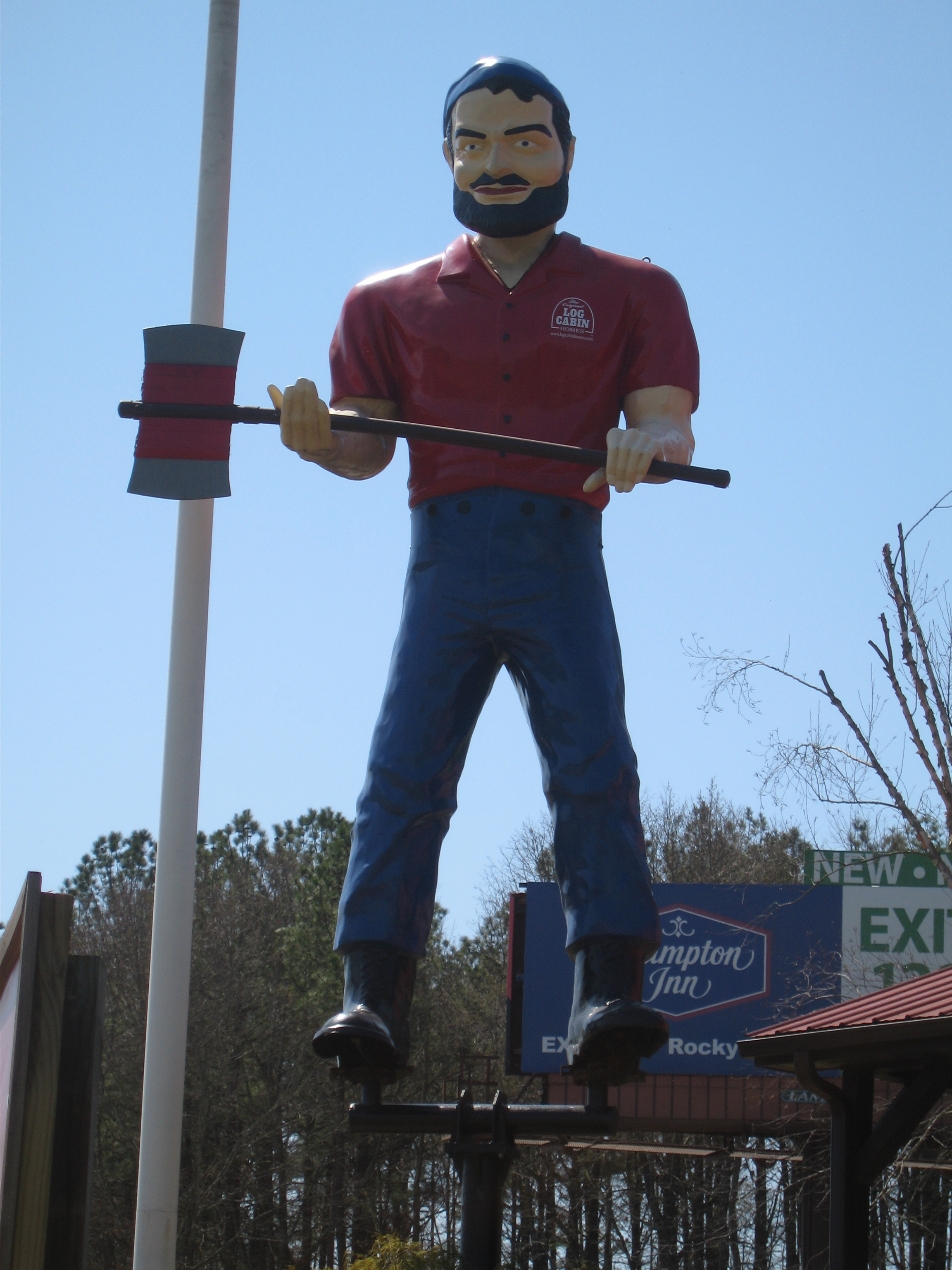
Rocky Mount, North Carolina

- Harry's On The Hill Cadillac GMC, Asheville (Chief Pontiac).
- Paul Bunyan holding an axe, with Babe the Blue Ox, Original Log Cabin Company, Rocky Mount.
- White's Tire Company, Wilson.
- Native Brews Tap & Grill, Cherokee.
- Daniel Boone in Daniel Boone Village, Hillsborough (removed in 2022)

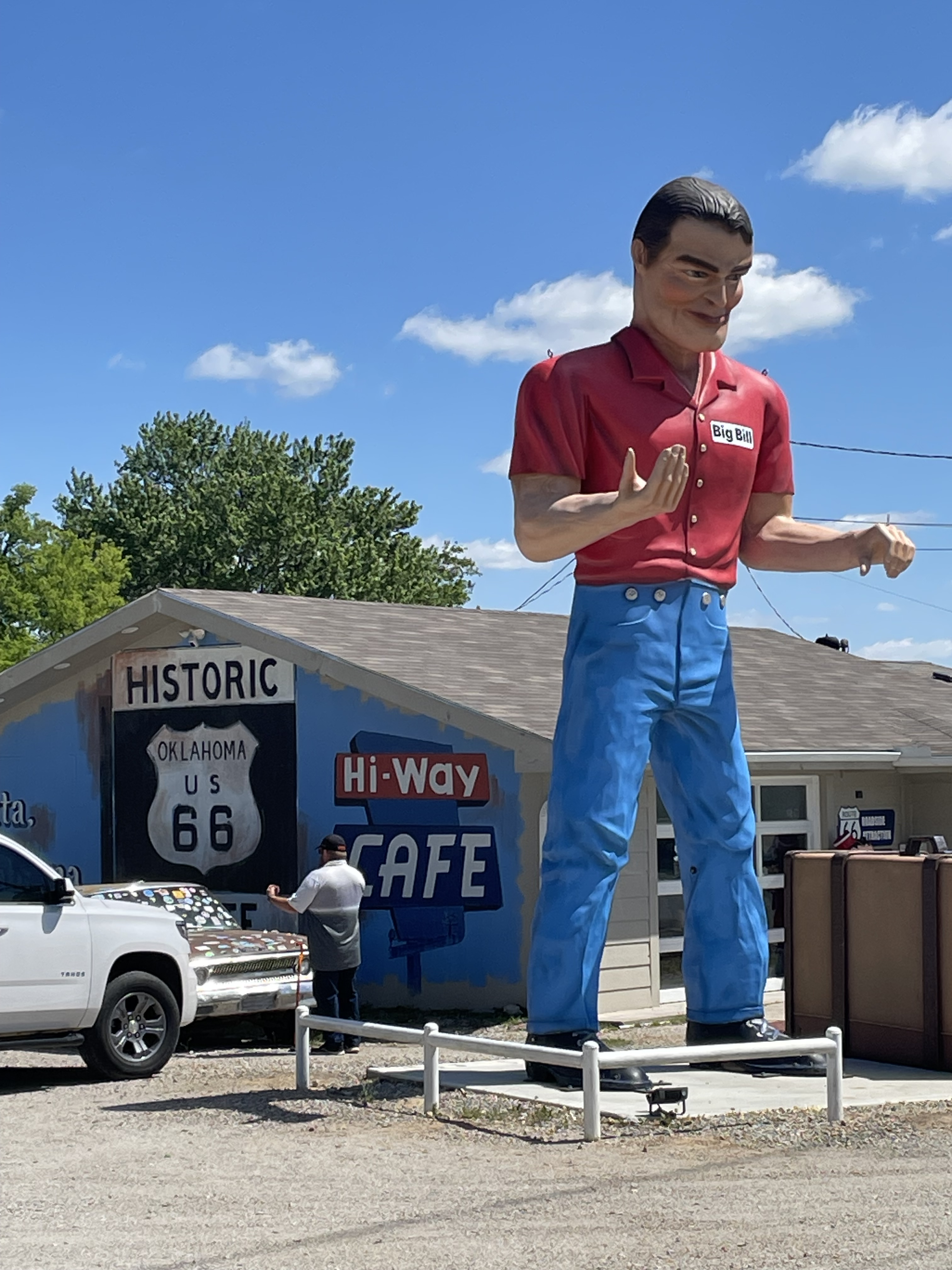
Big Bill, Vinita, OK

== North Dakota ==
- Chieftain Motel, Carrington (figure is a Native American with upraised arm)

== Oklahoma ==
- Buck Atom the Space Cowboy, Stella Atom, and Meadow Gold Mack Tulsa.
- Native American with arm stretched out at Indian Trading Post in Calumet.
- Big Bill, at Hi-Way Cafe, Vinita, on old US-66.
- Copeland cowboy #1, at Copeland Switch Antique Shop.
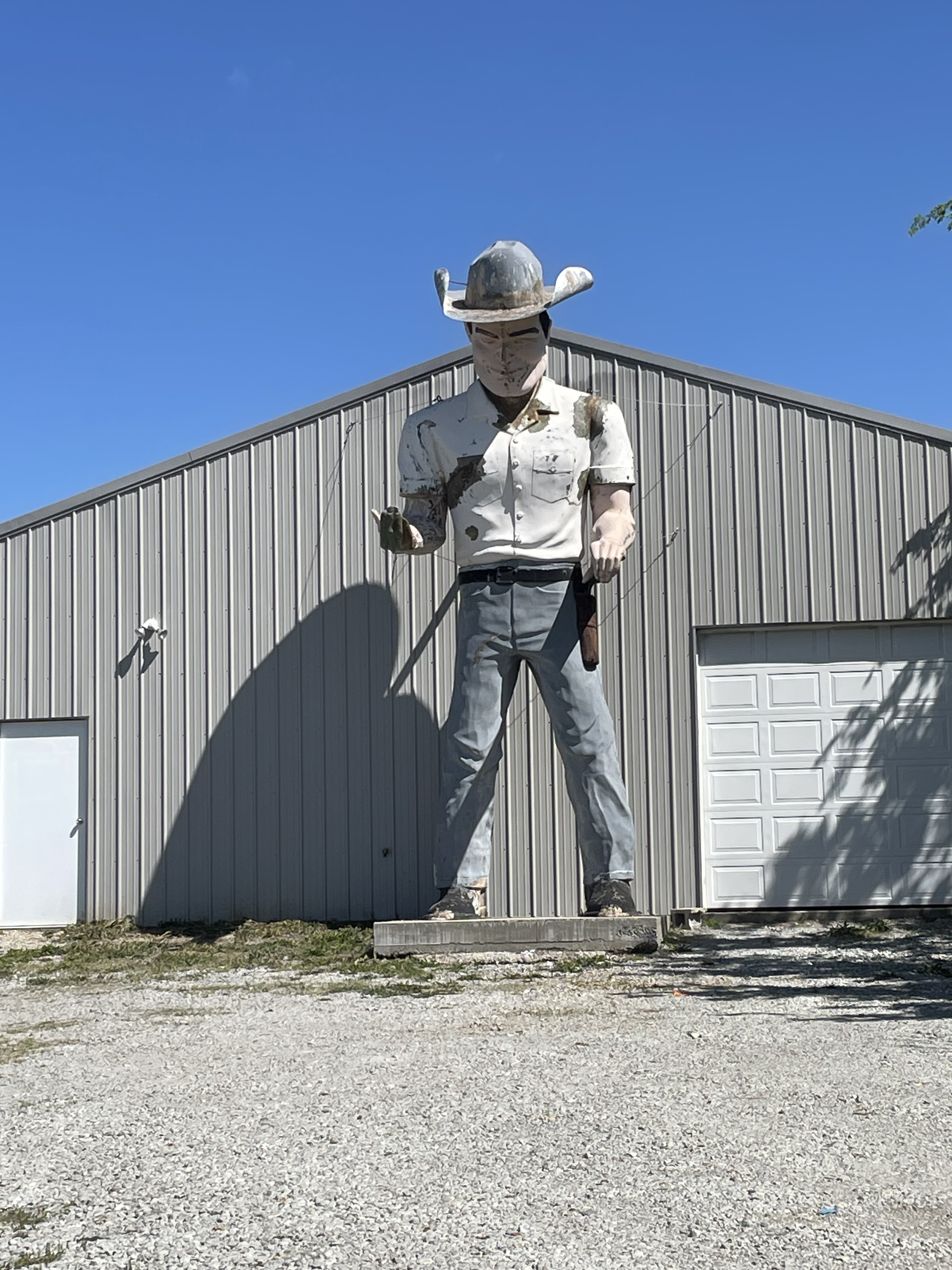
- Copeland cowboy #1
  Copeland cowboy #2, at Copeland Switch Antique Shop.

== Oregon ==
- Harvey the Giant Rabbit (originally The Texaco Big Friend) in Reedville.

== Pennsylvania ==
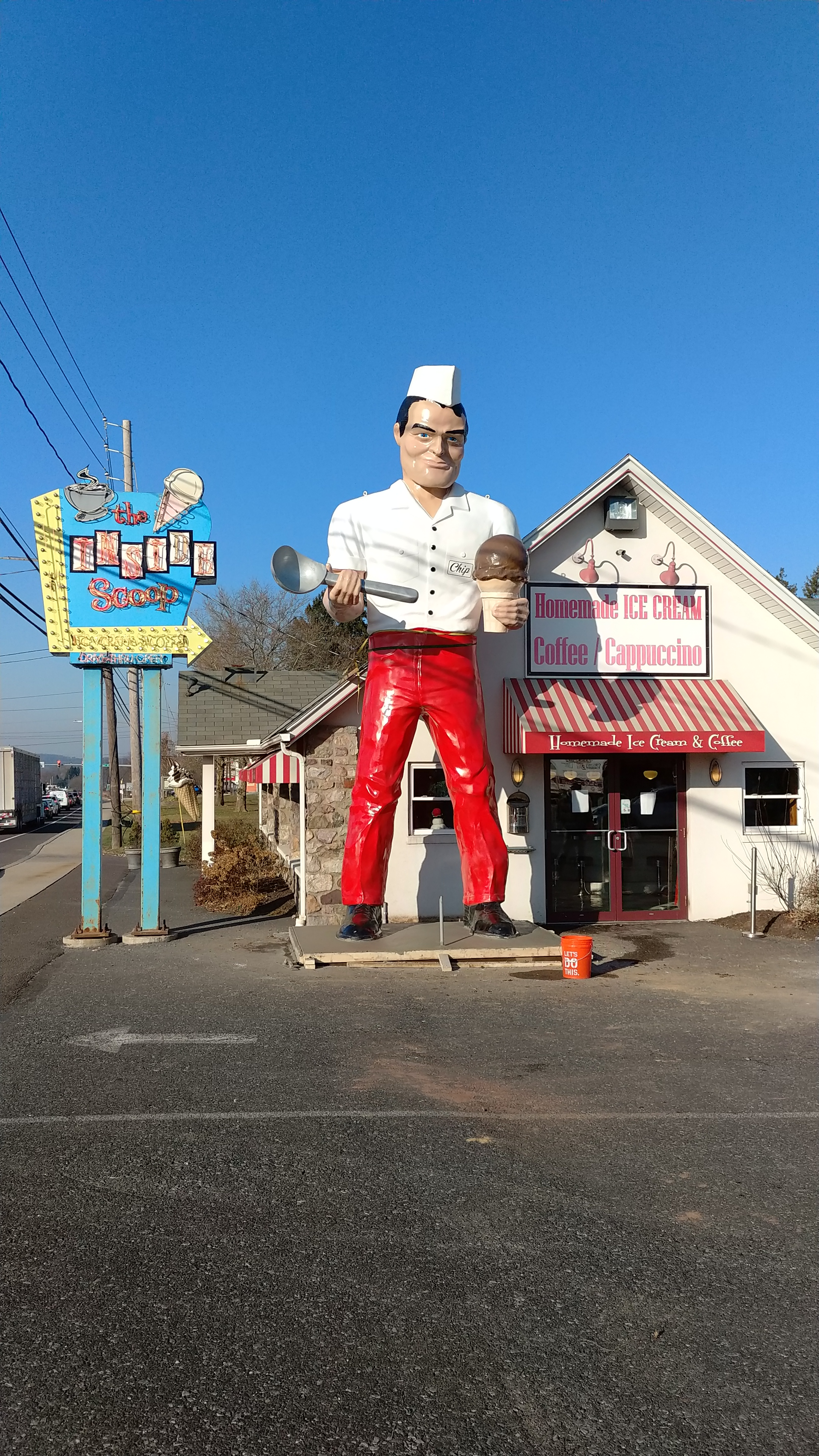
"Chip" at The Inside Scoop ice cream shop

- Cadet Restaurant, Kittanning.
- Lugnutz Tire Service, Greensburg.
- The Inside Scoop ice cream shop in Coopersburg.
- Muffler Man at Mr. Tire, Uniontown.

== South Dakota ==
- Automotive Brake & Exhaust, Sioux Falls - 'Mr. Bendo', arm upraised holding an exhaust pipe in one hand.
- Full Throttle Saloon (new location), 'Windover Willie' originally from Winnemucca, Nevada. Located at 19942 Hwy 79, Vale - Cowboy holding a cigar in his left hand and a mug of beer in his right.

== Texas ==
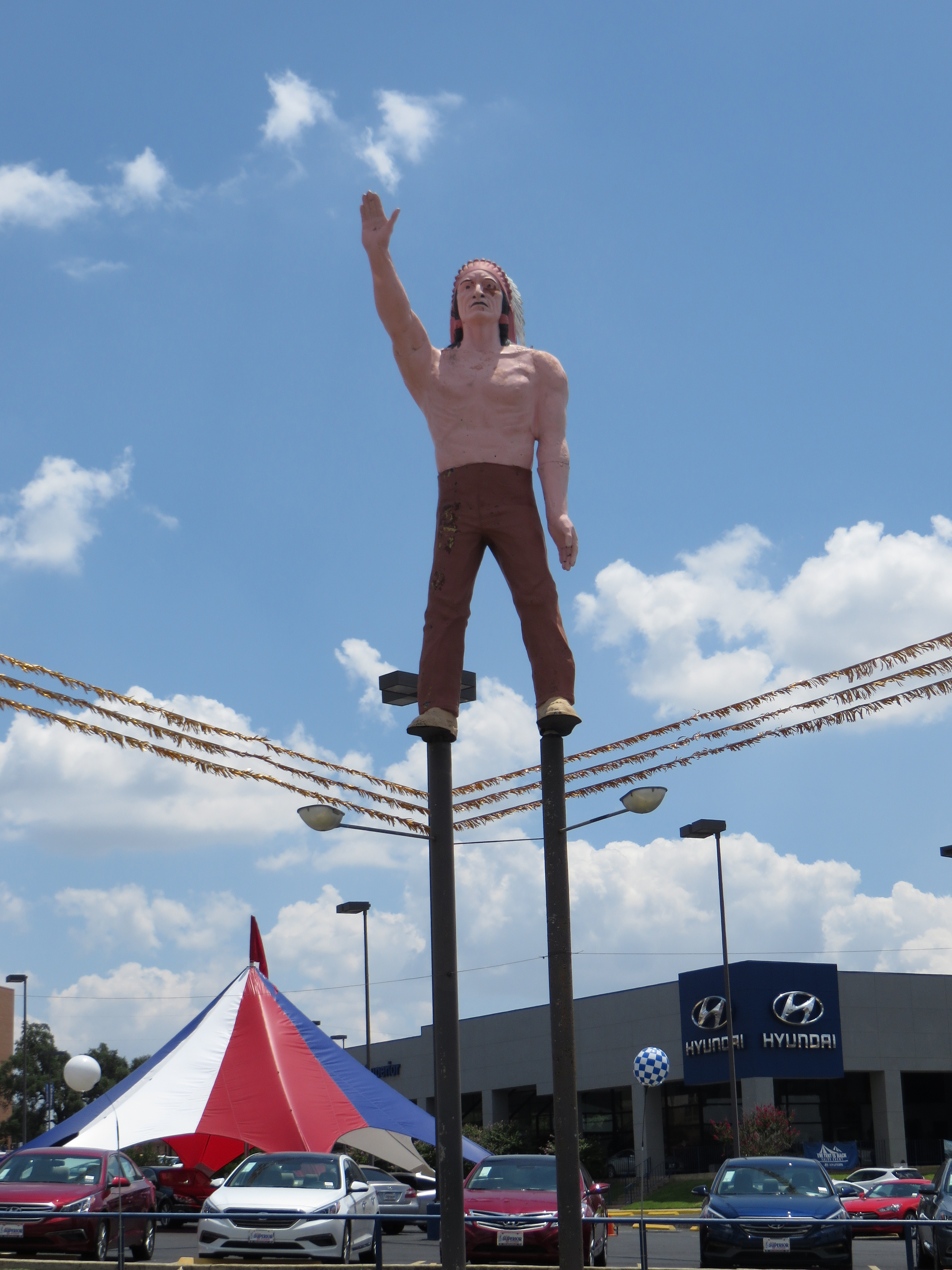
Red McCombs

- Red McCombs Big Chief in downtown San Antonio.
- Mr. Bendo, Paul Bunyan, at San Angelo.
- Glenn Goode and Mary Jean Goode's "Big People!": Cowboy, two Big Johns and a Uniroyal Gal in Gainesville.
- Happy The Halfwit at Kenn's Muffler Shop in Beaumont.
- 2nd Amendment Cowboy at Cadillac RV Park in Amarillo.
- Fat Ass Brewery, east of Fredericksburg on US-290.
- A giant with an Alfred E. Neuman head holds an absurdly large muffler at Ken's Muffler and Brake in Dallas.
- Big Chief located in the north end zone of Stuart B. Lumpkins Stadium, home of the Waxahachie High School Indians and Lady Indians, in Waxahachie, Texas.

== Tennessee ==
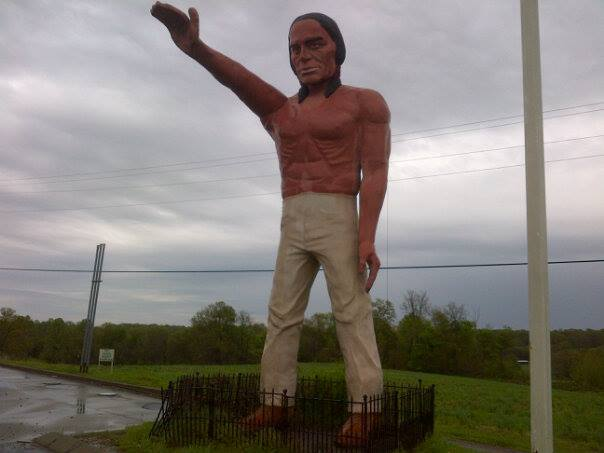
Native American in chinos

- Native American in Chinos - Beside Sad Sam's at Exit 112 off of I-65, near Cross Plains.
- Pal's, Kingsport - Man carrying a hamburger.
- Muffler Man at Four Way Mufflers & Motors, 1368 E Broadway, Gallatin.

== Utah ==
- "Big John", a coal miner on South Main Street in front of the Helper Civic Auditorium and city library (formerly the city hall) in Helper.
- "Mr. Spock," a muffler man repainted to resemble Mr. Spock sits atop a business in Salt Lake City.

== Virginia ==
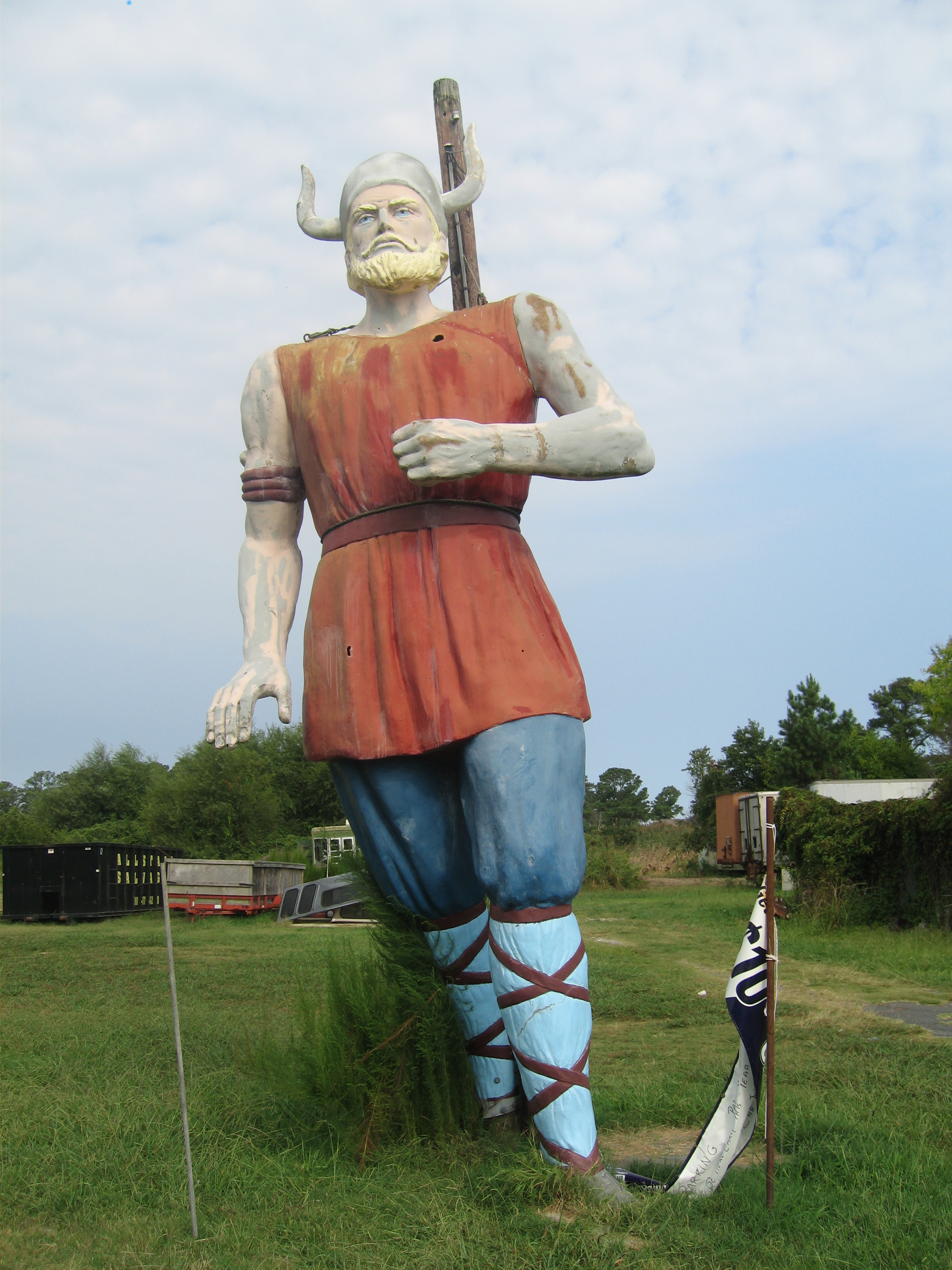
Chincoteaque Viking

- Chincoteague Viking, Chincoteague Island.
- Auto Muffler King at 5835 Jefferson Avenue in Newport News.
- Williamson Road Service Center at 3110 Williamson Road, Roanoke.
- Coeburn Red Oak Trading Company.

== Washington ==
- Paul Bunyan, Shelton.
- One on the roof of the SSA Marine building, 1105 Hewitt Avenue, Everett.
- 22-foot cowboy muffler man on Highway 12, lower east Pomeroy.

== West Virginia ==
- Big Red stands at hau in Parkersburg near the South Parkersburg Shopping Plaza. Erected in the early 1980's, Red has served as a landmark for Cherokee Village Auto Center and other businesses at its location.

During the mid 2010's Parkersburg Big Reds Head Football Coach, Don Reeves attempted to relocate Big Red to PHS Stadium Field.

== Wisconsin ==
- Gus's Drive-In, East Troy - Gus's Giant.

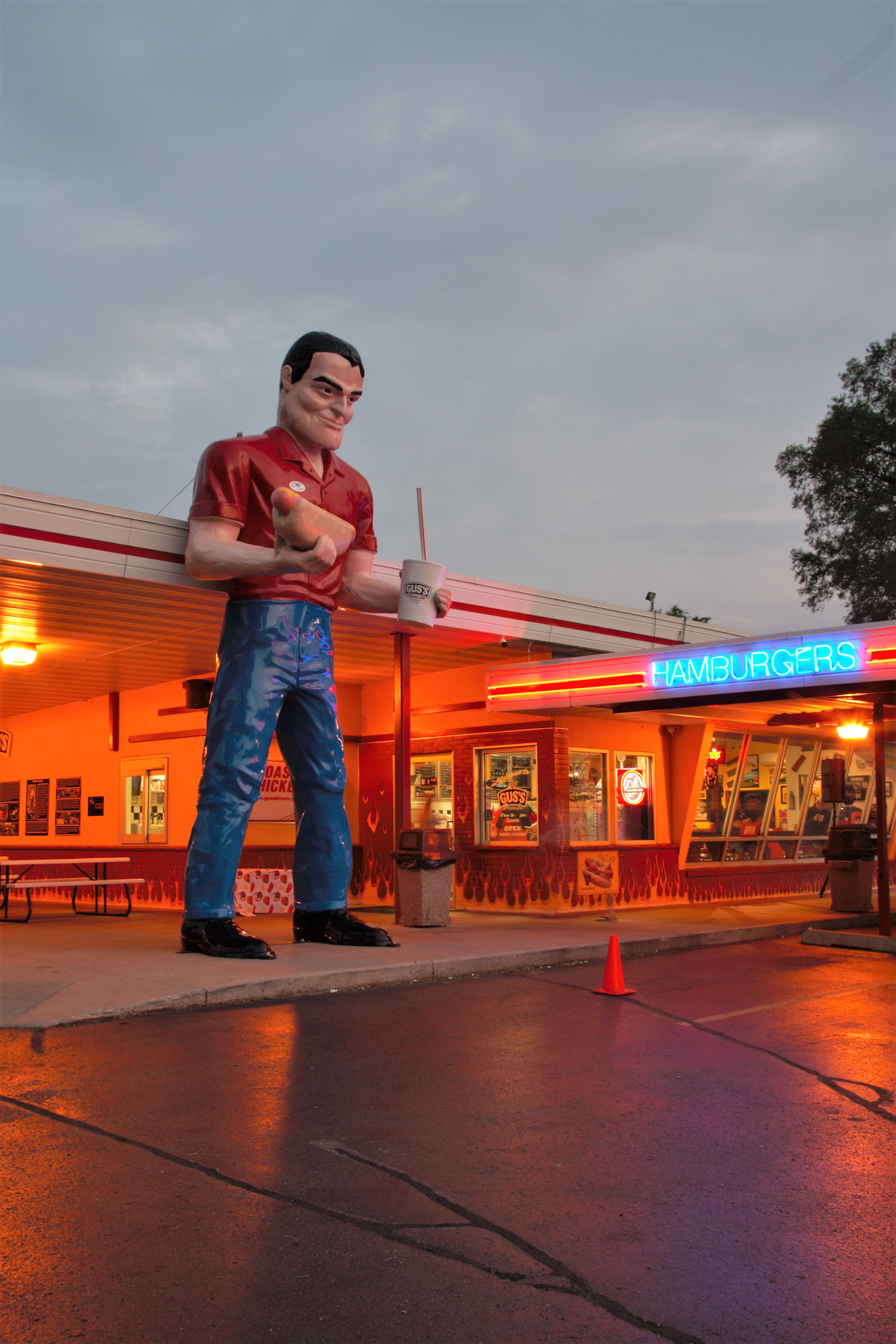
Gus's Drive-In, East Troy, WI

- Bulik's Amusement Center, Spooner - Cowboy.
- Fasco Appliance, Oshkosh - Paul Bunyan.
- Larry the Logroller, a 22-foot (6.7 m) a logroller muffler man with a pike pole in Wabeno.
