= International Fiberglass =

Defunct American fiberglass mold sculpture manufacturer

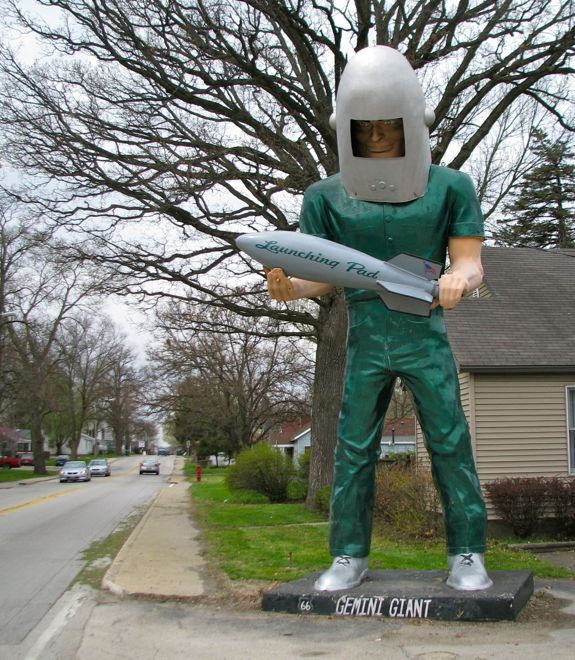
The Gemini Giant at the Launching Pad, a drive-in restaurant in Illinois

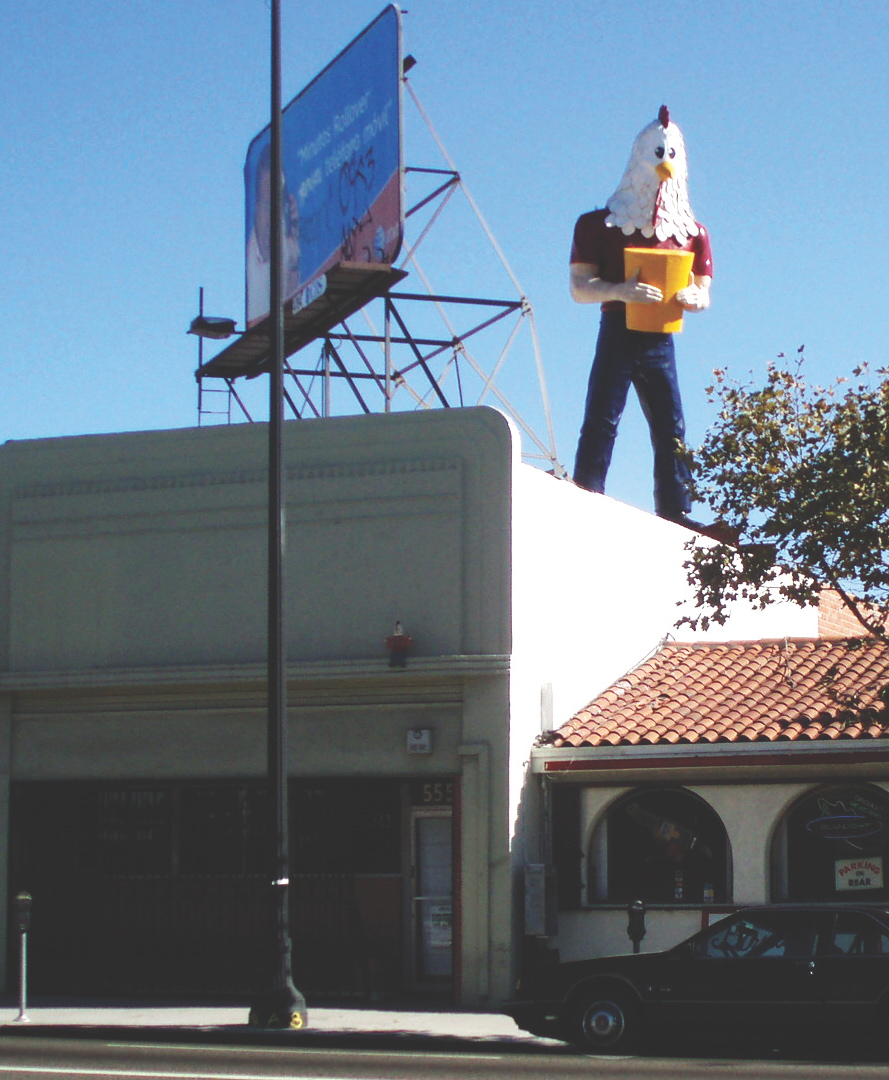
Chicken Boy in Highland Park, Los Angeles

International Fiberglass was a fiberglass molding company founded in Venice, California in about 1963, best known for their large molded fiberglass roadside advertising sculptures commonly called "Muffler Men".

The company was formed when Steve Dashew purchased Prewitt Fiberglass Animals and acquired all of the molds created by Bob Prewitt. One of the molds which Dashew acquired in the transaction was a 20-foot human figure, which Prewitt had used in 1962 to create an oversized statue for the Paul Bunyan Cafe in Flagstaff, Arizona. The company had made fiberglass boats, but Dashew decided to use the mold to create some business during slow boatbuilding periods.

He began advertising his outsize figure-making capability, and began selling his giant figures in 1964. The outsize figures eventually included a female, who could be fitted with either a bikini swimsuit or a dress. In 10 years of production, International Fiberglass sold hundreds of oversized figures, including cowboys, Indians, astronauts, giant chickens, dinosaurs, Yogi Bears, and tigers, selling each for $1,800 to $2,800 (or as low as $1,000 when ordered in bulk, as when Texaco ordered a batch of 300).

Dashew ceased production in 1974, and sold the company's assets in 1976. The outsized molds were destroyed after the sale.
