= Eagle Hotel =

Eagle Hotel may refer to:

- Eagle Hotel (Wilmington, Illinois)
- Eagle Hotel (Concord, New Hampshire)
- Eagle Hotel (Waterford, Pennsylvania)
