= Joliet Area Historical Museum =

Historical museum in Joliet, Illinois

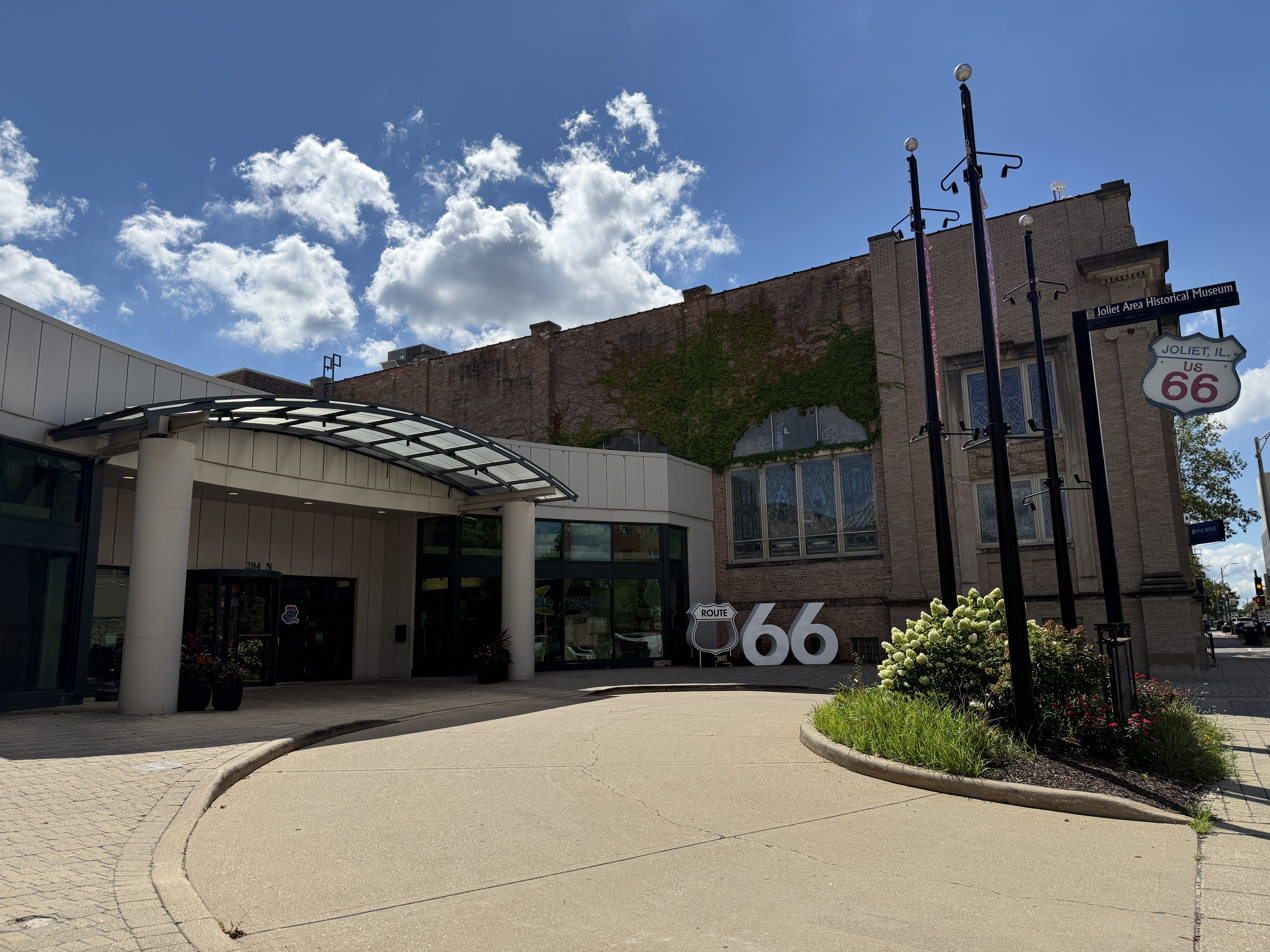
- Established: 1977
- Location: 204 N Ottawa Street; Joliet, Illinois
- Coordinates: 41.5280°N 88.0827°W
- Type: Local history
- Website: www.jolietmuseum.org

The Joliet Area Historical Museum is a historical museum located in Joliet, Illinois. The museum documents the history of Joliet and surrounding Will County.

== Description and history ==
The museum adaptively reuses an urban space formerly occupied by the Ottawa Street Methodist Church, which was designed by Joliet architect G. Julian Barnes, and built in 1909. Located on one of the alternate paths of old historic U.S. Route 66, the museum's modern ground-floor addition features the Route 66 Welcome Center, which presents a permanent exhibit called the Route 66 Experience. This newer part of the museum also connects to the historic Joliet Chamber of Commerce Clubhouse next door (now known as the Renaissance Center of the City Center campus of Joliet Junior College) and to the JJC Renaissance Center's main dining room, which is staffed by the college's hospitality and culinary school students and open to the public.

During the late 20th century, formerly rural Will County townships grew rapidly, while properties in central city Joliet were threatened. In 2002, the former church's urban space was reconfigured as a historic museum. A separate wing is home to an exhibit about the Joliet-raised NASA engineer and JJC graduate John C. Houbolt, honored as the chief conceptualizer of the lunar orbit rendezvous segment of the U.S. Apollo program and the use of a lunar module to shuttle astronauts to and from the surface of the Moon.

The museum is located at 204 N. Ottawa Street in central Joliet. An admission fee is charged.

=== Joliet Prison ===
As of 2014, the museum was seeking to establish guided tours of the landmark former Joliet Correctional Center, originally built in 1858, for Route 66 travelers and other interested tourists. It opened for tours in 2018, referred to as the Old Joliet Prison Historical Site on its website.

=== Gemini Giant ===
The museum entered into negotiations to purchase the Gemini Giant and Launching Pad Restaurant in Wilmington, IL in early 2023. The owner of the property, Holly Barker, posted images of a signed contract in October 2023, showing the museum agreed to a purchase price of $420,000 for the real estate, $150,000 for the Gemini Giant itself, and $50,000 for all equipment and inventory remaining at the property, along with a separate agreement to purchase the house next door for $200,000. The following day, Barker posted a letter from the museum's lawyers to her own, revealing she refused to extend a closing deadline. In response, the museum voted to make no further offers, allow the contract to expire, and walk away from the deal.

In the months after, the museum received the $1 million grant from the Illinois Department of Commerce and Economic Opportunity that was holding up the closing. However, by the time this grant was received, the Launching Pad, without the house next door, was now listed for sale for $1.4 million. Local newspapers reported the museum was still looking to purchase the entire property as of December 2023. Greg Peerbolte, executive director of the museum, confirmed the reports but said the museum would only be interested if the owner "is willing to substantially lower her asking price." The museum would run a visitor center and gift shop out of the building, and lease the restaurant operation to another party.

On December 5, the Joliet City Council tabled a vote on a $250,000 grant to the museum for 2024 operations. City officials want to look further into the dismissal of 13 employees and volunteers earlier in the year. The inspector general, Sean Connolly, advised the city to conduct an audit of the museum before providing any additional funding. Connolly was removed from the position on January 24, and the Joliet city council approved the grant to the museum on February 6.

The museum won the auction of the Gemini Giant for $275,000 and has loaned it to the City of Wilmington until February 2045.
