= Eagle Hotel (Wilmington, Illinois) =

- U.S. National Register of Historic Places
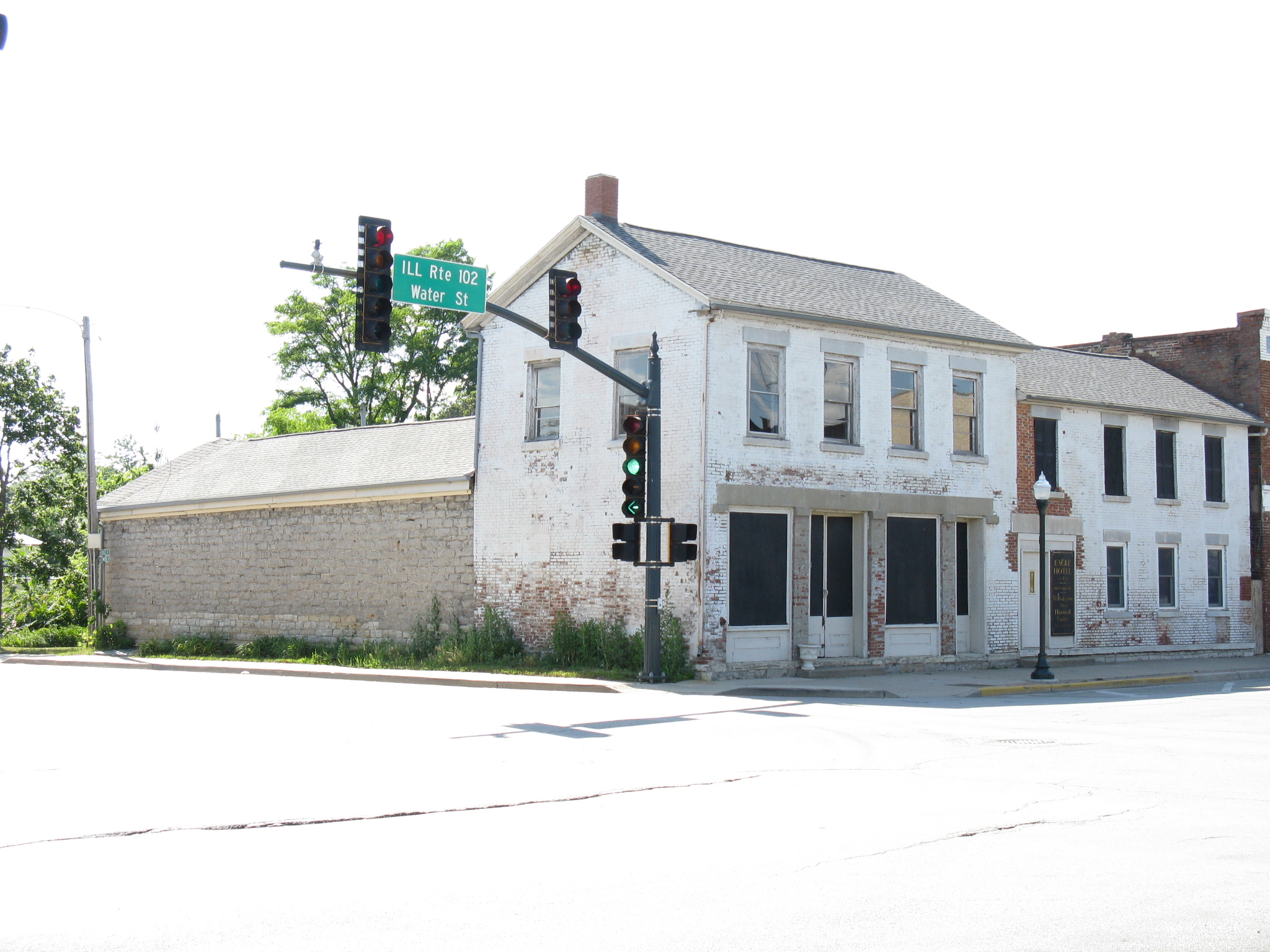

- Location within Illinois Location within the United States
- Location: 100 N. Water St., Wilmington, Will County, Illinois, U.S.
- Coordinates: 41°18′28″N 88°8′51″W
- Built: c. 1837
- Architectural style: Mid 19th Century Revival
- NRHP reference No.: 94000021
- Added to NRHP: February 16, 1994

The Eagle Hotel is a historic former hotel in Wilmington, Illinois.

== History ==
The first settlers in Wilmington arrived in 1836, favoring the land's abundance of streams and lumber. Thomas Cox platted the land and constructed the first grist mill in the region. Farmers traveled to the mill from long distances and required a place to stay while the corn and wheat was being ground. The land on which the hotel stood was purchased by David Lizer in 1836 and likely organized the project himself. The exact date when the building was constructed was not recorded, but it probably was built after the first general store in 1837. The building was likely used first to house goods for the mills in the region and may have served as a trading post.

Henry Brown, who owned the town's general store, build the two-story hotel across the street from the store on Water Street. The hotel is of no particular style, but is most strongly influenced by the Greek Revival movement. An addition was added to the hotel in the 1840s, which connected the hotel to the warehouse. This addition featured a storefront where independent businesses could rent space to sell their goods.

The hotel business flourished following the connection of Wilmington to the Chicago and Alton Railroad in the early 1850s. However, the more luxurious Exchange Hotel was constructed across the street in 1844, and the Eagle Hotel failed to see the same increase in business. The Eagle Hotel managed be profitable by offering cheap rooms to families who recently moved to the region. U.S. Route 66 provided more customers upon its completion, but the hotel nonetheless was forced to convert to a boarding house to stay in business. The building was converted to apartments in the 1940s, retaining small businesses in the storefront until 1982. The Wilmington Area Historical Society purchased the building that year and converted it into a museum. A fire badly damaged the structure in 1990. It was added to the National Register of Historic Places in 1994. As of 2023, the Eagle Hotel is owned by Mark Nielsen.
