= Chicken Boy =

Fiberglass statue in Highland Park, Los Angeles

Coordinates: 34.10848°N 118.1942°W

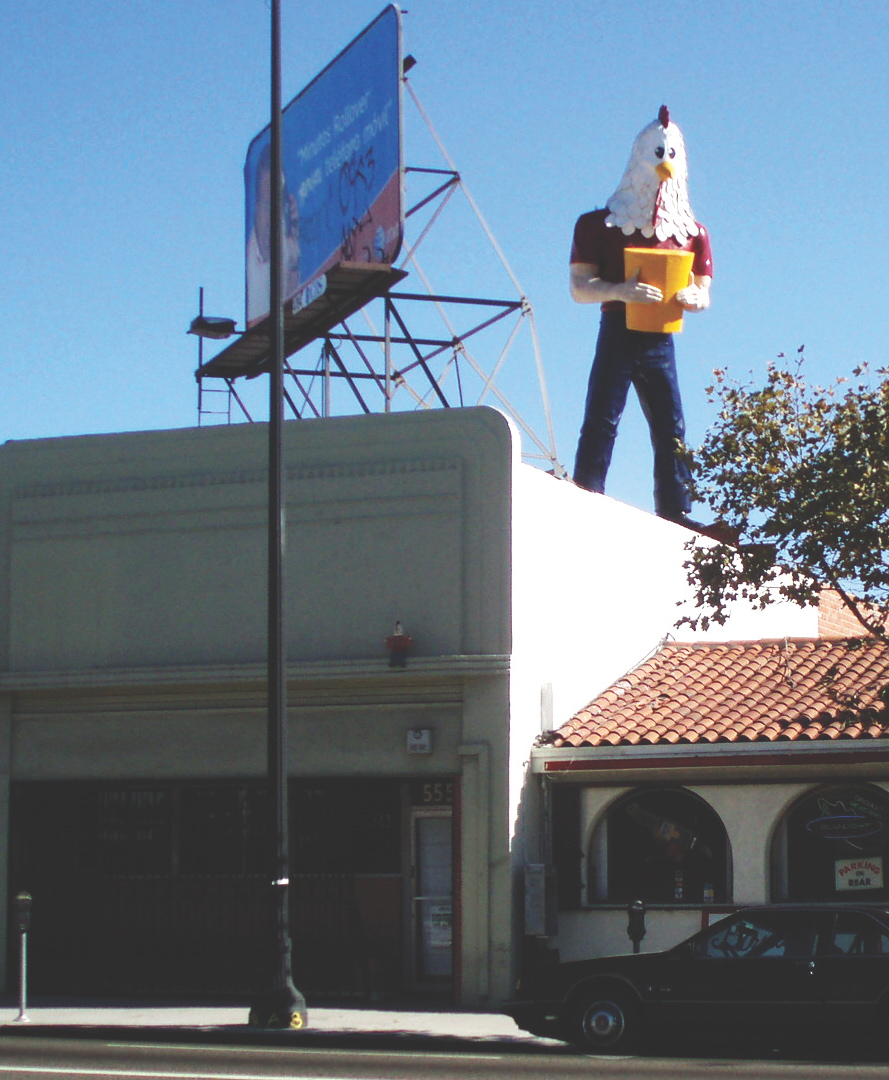
Chicken Boy

Chicken Boy is a statue located on North Figueroa Street in the Highland Park district of Los Angeles. The 22-foot tall fiberglass statue was recognized by Governor Arnold Schwarzenegger with the Governor's Historic Preservation Award in 2010.

== History ==
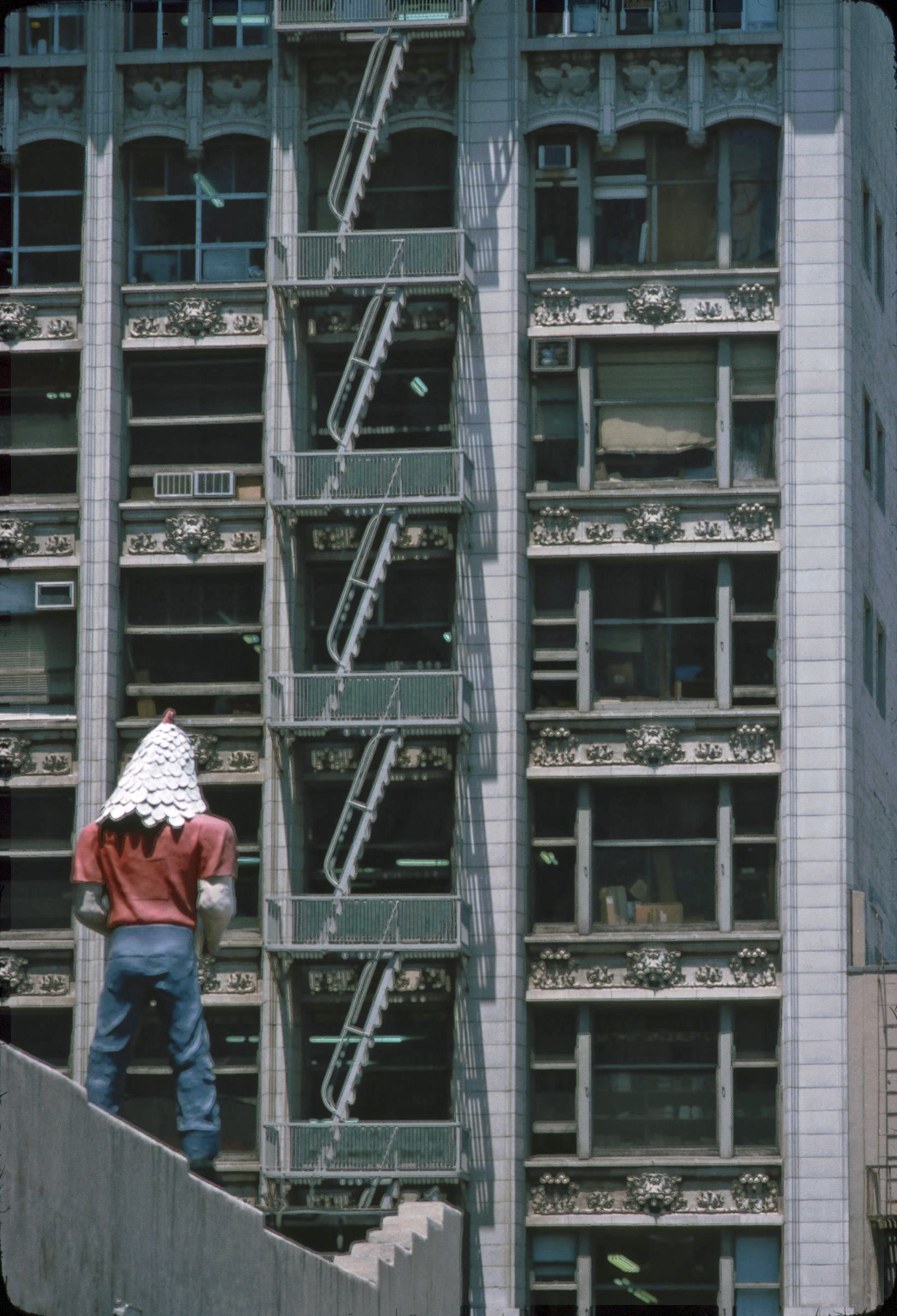
Chicken Boy at the original location in July 1977

The statue was originally built in the 1960s for the Chicken Boy Fried Chicken Restaurant, which was located in Downtown Los Angeles on Broadway between 4th and 5th streets, near the Grand Central Market. At that time, International Fiberglass Company of Venice was manufacturing roadside Paul Bunyan and Muffler Man statues for use as outdoor advertising. The Chicken Boy restaurant bought one and hired an artist to customize it. A chicken head was fabricated to replace the man's head. The arms were re-worked to face forward and hold a bucket, rather than an axe. The statue remained in place until 1984 when the restaurant owner died. The statue was eventually given to artist Amy Inouye. She stored it until 2007, when she moved the Chicken Boy statue to its current location at 5558 North Figueroa Street. Her design firm, Future Studio, had relocated to a commercial space that had a reinforced roof strong enough to support the statue. The Chicken Boy statue was preserved as a result of community effort and donated funds.

== Awards ==
- Governor's Historic Preservation Award, Sacramento, California, 2010.
- Community Beautification Grant, City of Los Angeles, 2005-2006.
- California Preservation Foundation, Three Minute Success Story, 2009.
- Highland Park Heritage Trust Preservation Award, 2009-2010.
- Commendation, City of Los Angeles, 2009.
- Commendation, California State Assembly, Sacramento, California, 2010.
