= Muffler man =

Large fiberglass roadside advertising figure

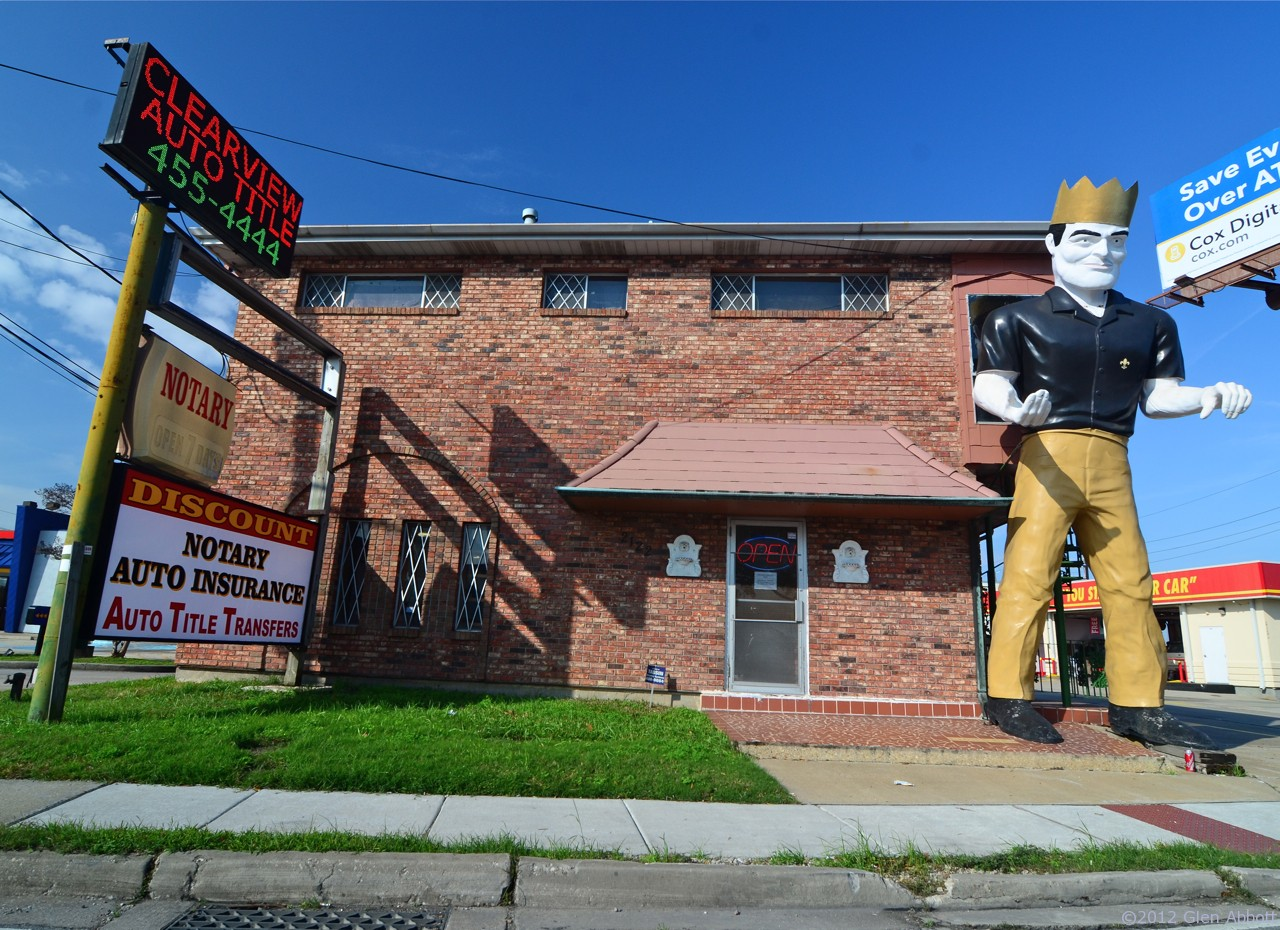
A muffler man that used to hold a Cozy Coupe car at Clearview Auto Title & Notary in Metairie, Louisiana

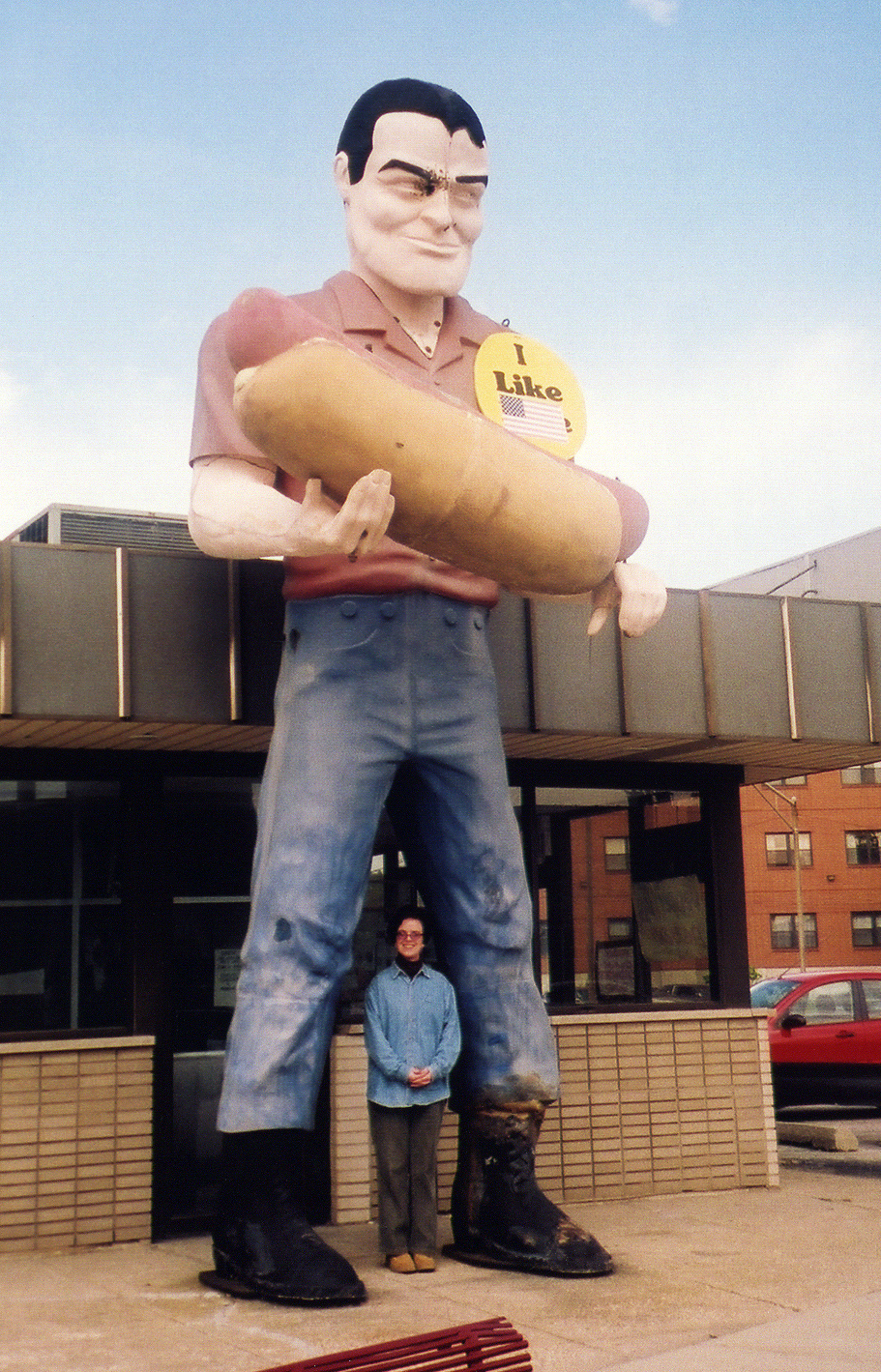
A muffler man holding a hot dog at Bunyon's in Cicero, Illinois

Muffler men are large molded fiberglass sculptures that are placed as advertising icons, roadside attractions, or for decorative purposes, predominantly in the United States. Standing approximately 18–25 ft (5.5–7.6 m) tall, the first figure was a Paul Bunyan character designed to hold an axe. Derivatives of that figure were widely used to hold full-sized car mufflers, tires, or other items promoting various roadside businesses.

International Fiberglass of Venice, California constructed most Muffler men. While the fiberglass figures are no longer manufactured, many still exist throughout a number of states across the United States with some also in Canada. At least four remain on U.S. Route 66, including Chicken Boy and Gemini Giant.

Muffler men have made appearances as characters in the comic strip "Zippy the Pinhead" by Bill Griffith, often in conversation with Zippy. Two books have been devoted to the distinctive roadside figures and the July 2012 issue of AAA New Mexico Journey devoted its front cover to their 50th anniversary.

== History ==
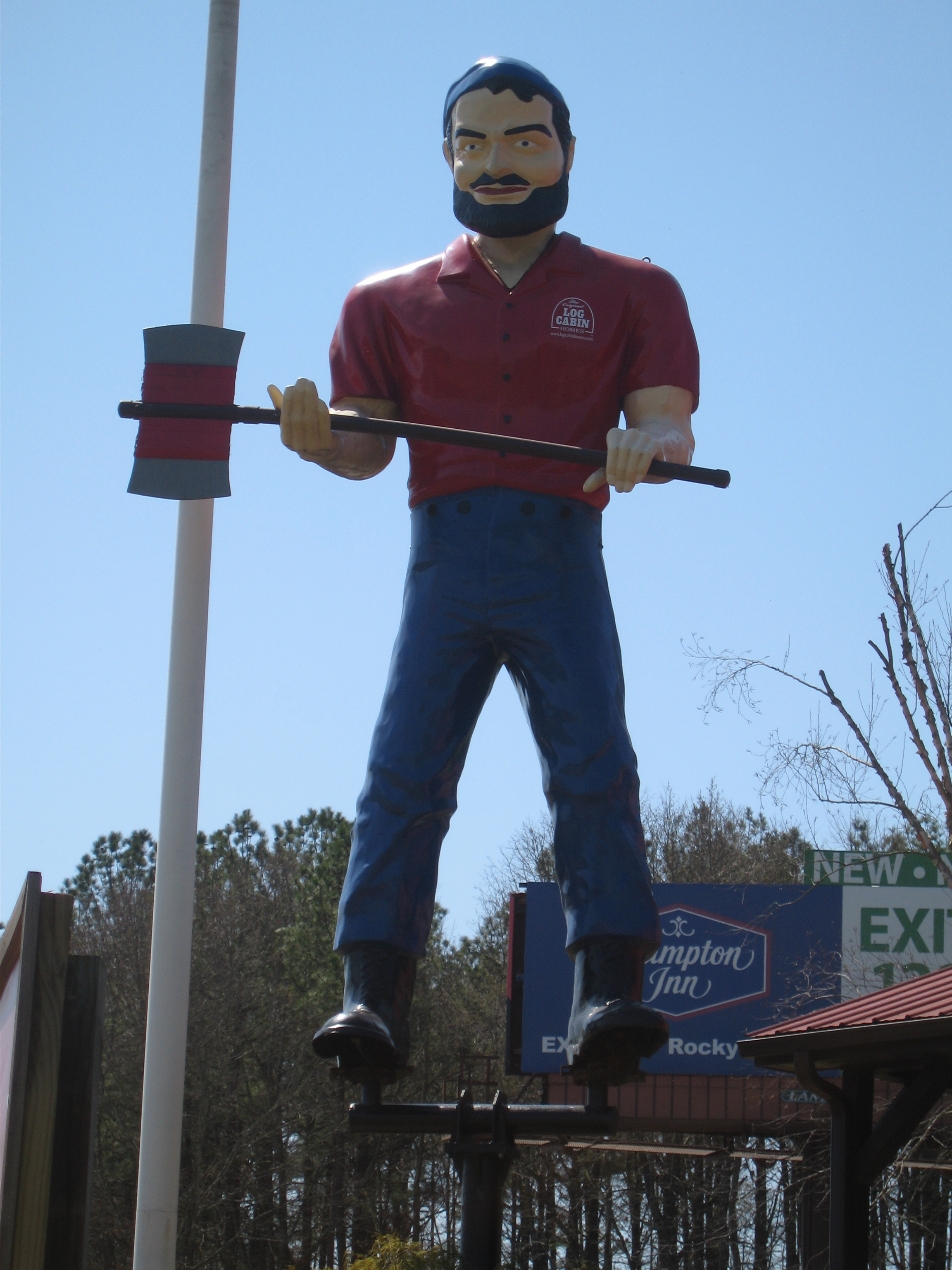
Paul Bunyan muffler man in Rocky Mount, North Carolina

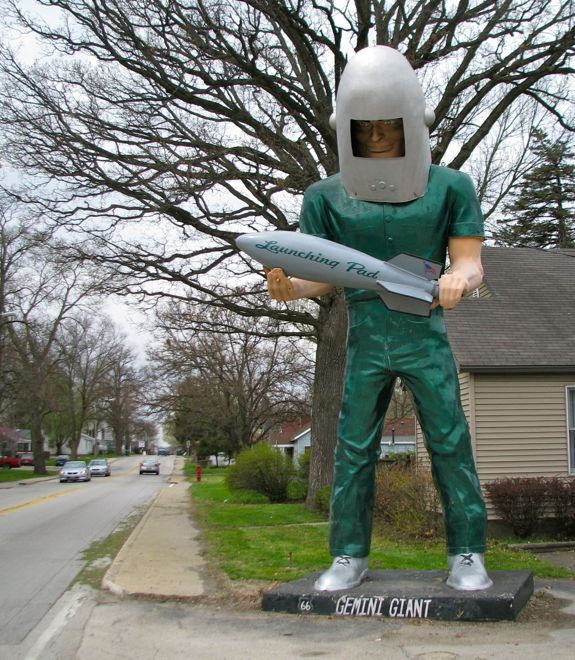
The Gemini Giant at the Launching Pad, a now-closed restaurant in Wilmington, Illinois

Boatbuilder Steve Dashew established International Fiberglass in 1963 by purchasing and renaming Bob Prewitt's workshop, Prewitt Fiberglass. The oversized fiberglass men, women, and dinosaurs began as a sideline.

The first of the figures, a Paul Bunyan holding an oversized axe to promote a restaurant, was created by Bob Prewitt in 1962 for the Lumberjack Café on Route 66 in Flagstaff, Arizona. Bill Swan, who worked for Prewitt, helped to design the face of the first Paul Bunyan muffler man.

As the fiberglass molds for this initial figure existed when Dashew acquired the company, similar characters could be readily created by keeping the same basic characteristics (such as the right palm up, left palm down position in which the original Bunyan lumberjack figure held his axe) with minor variation. Various fiberglass molds allowed different heads, limbs, or torsos to be substituted to create multiple variant characters. Some would promote food, others automotive products. A fifteen-foot Amish man standing over a diner in Lancaster County, Pennsylvania and a Uniroyal gal in a skirt or bikini were among the many variants.

Thousands of the oversize figures would be deployed in a little over a decade at a typical cost of $1000–$2800 each. Some would be customised as promotions of individual roadside businesses on the US Highway system. Many were created to advertise franchise and chain brands, such as the Enco and Humble tigers and the Philips Petroleum cowboys. A novelty fiberglass dinosaur figure was most often seen promoting Sinclair Oil stations, but also appeared at various miniature golf courses.

When businesses closed or were sold, often the figures would be repainted and adapted to represent different characters or were relocated. The statues have become natives, Vikings, football players and sports mascots, country bumpkins, cooks and chefs, cowboys, soldiers, sea pirates, and astronauts. One Native American-themed muffler man in Bemidji, Minnesota was eventually identified with Nanabozho, a figure in Ojibwe folklore. The use of roadside novelties represented a means for independent businesses to differentiate themselves in an era before two-lane highways were bypassed by freeways; businesses located directly on the main road would rely heavily on neon signage, promotional displays, and gimmicks to make themselves more visible to passing motorists.

Increases in costs to deliver the lightweight but oversized figures proved problematic and business declined with the 1973 oil crisis. International Fiberglass was sold and closed permanently in 1976. Many of the characters, such as a Texaco Big Friend, initially created for a cancelled service station chain promotion, would become rare after International Fiberglass ceased operations.

== See also ==
- Big Tex
- Chicken Boy in Highland Park, California
- Gemini Giant in Wilmington, Illinois
- Frank-N-Stein, a unique fiberglass sculpture made by an Indiana artist
- Vegas Vic
