= Gemini Giant =

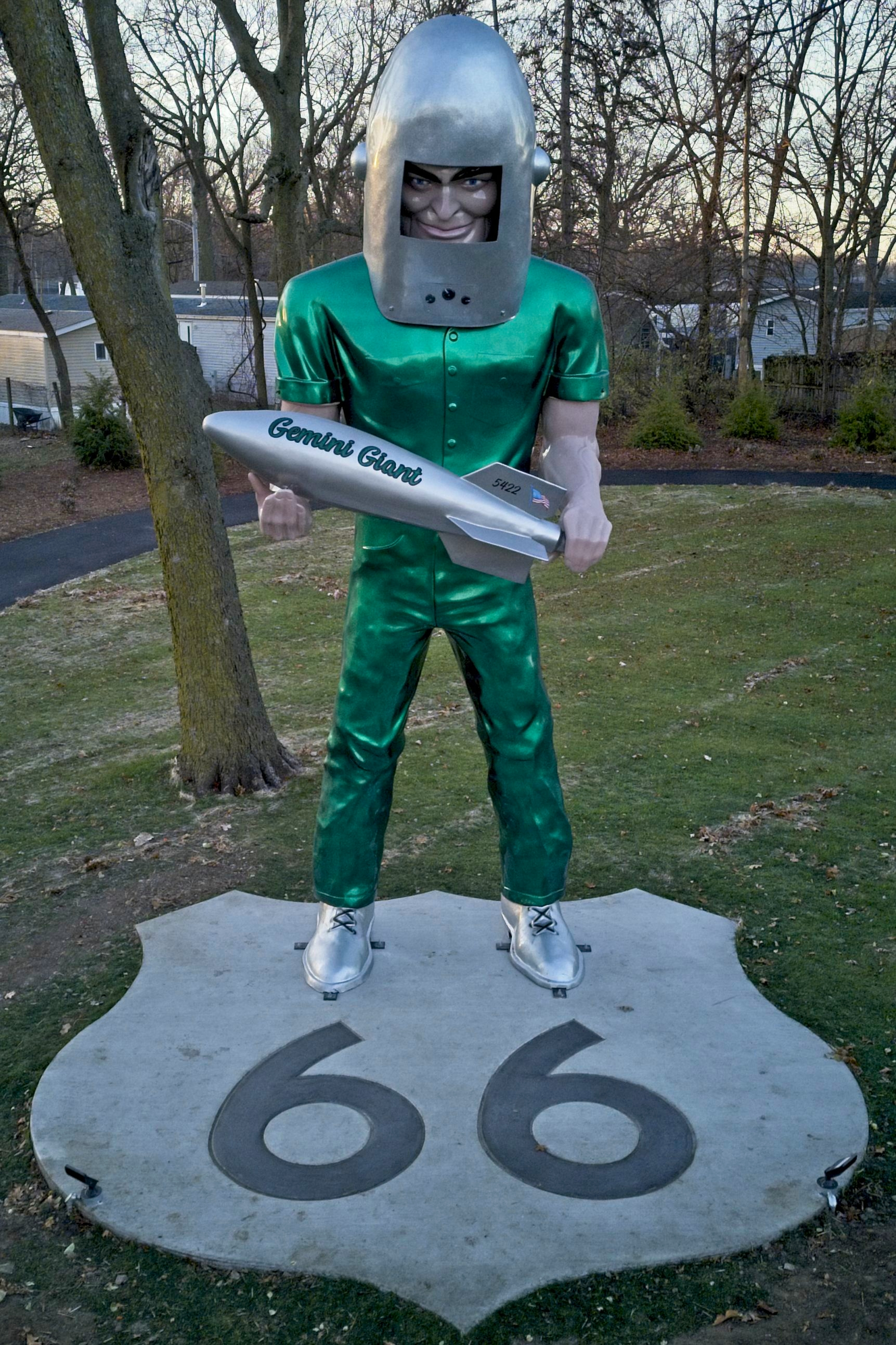

General information
- Type: Statue
- Location: Entrance to South Island Park, Wilmington IL, 201 Bridge St. Wilmington, IL 60481
- Coordinates: 41°18′21.8334″N 88°8′58.9272″W
- Year built: 1964; 62 years ago
- Relocated: November 29, 2024
- Renovated: 2019; 7 years ago 2024; 2 years ago
- Owner: Joliet Area Historical Museum

Height
- Height: 30 ft

Dimensions
- Weight: 438 lbs

Technical details
- Material: Fiberglass

Design and construction
- Awards and prizes: Illinois Route 66 Hall of Fame

Renovating team
- Main contractor: 2019: John Mercer 2024: [Re]Giant

The Gemini Giant is a fiberglass roadside statue located in Wilmington, IL along historic U.S. Route 66. The statue depicts a helmeted astronaut holding a rocket and is a variation of the "Muffler Man" figures popularized in the 1960s.

== History ==
=== The Launching Pad Years, 1960-2022 ===
John and Bernice Korelc opened a Dari-Delite restaurant in 1960. The proprietors bought a 438-pound fiberglass Muffler Man figure for $3,500 at the annual National Restaurant Association convention. Seeking to capitalize on America's fascination with the Space Race, they rebranded the restaurant as the "Launching Pad" and had the statue outfitted as an astronaut. A naming contest was held at the local grade school, resulting in the "Gemini Giant" moniker. The Giant often appeared in national and international media alongside stories about the Mother Road, and became one of the most photographed destinations for travelers making the Route 66 journey.

The Gemini Giant was inducted into the Illinois Route 66 Hall of Fame in 2000.

The restaurant remained family owned until 2007, but struggled afterwards even with the Gemini Giant's continued popularity. The restaurant was abandoned for years beginning in 2010, and changed ownership again in late 2017.

After a briefly successful reopening, the business was forced to close as a result of the COVID-19 pandemic. Despite receiving over a half million dollars in federal grants and forgiven loans between the Paycheck Protection Program and the Restaurant Revitalization Fund, the restaurant would close permanently in July 2022.

=== 2024 Auction and relocation ===
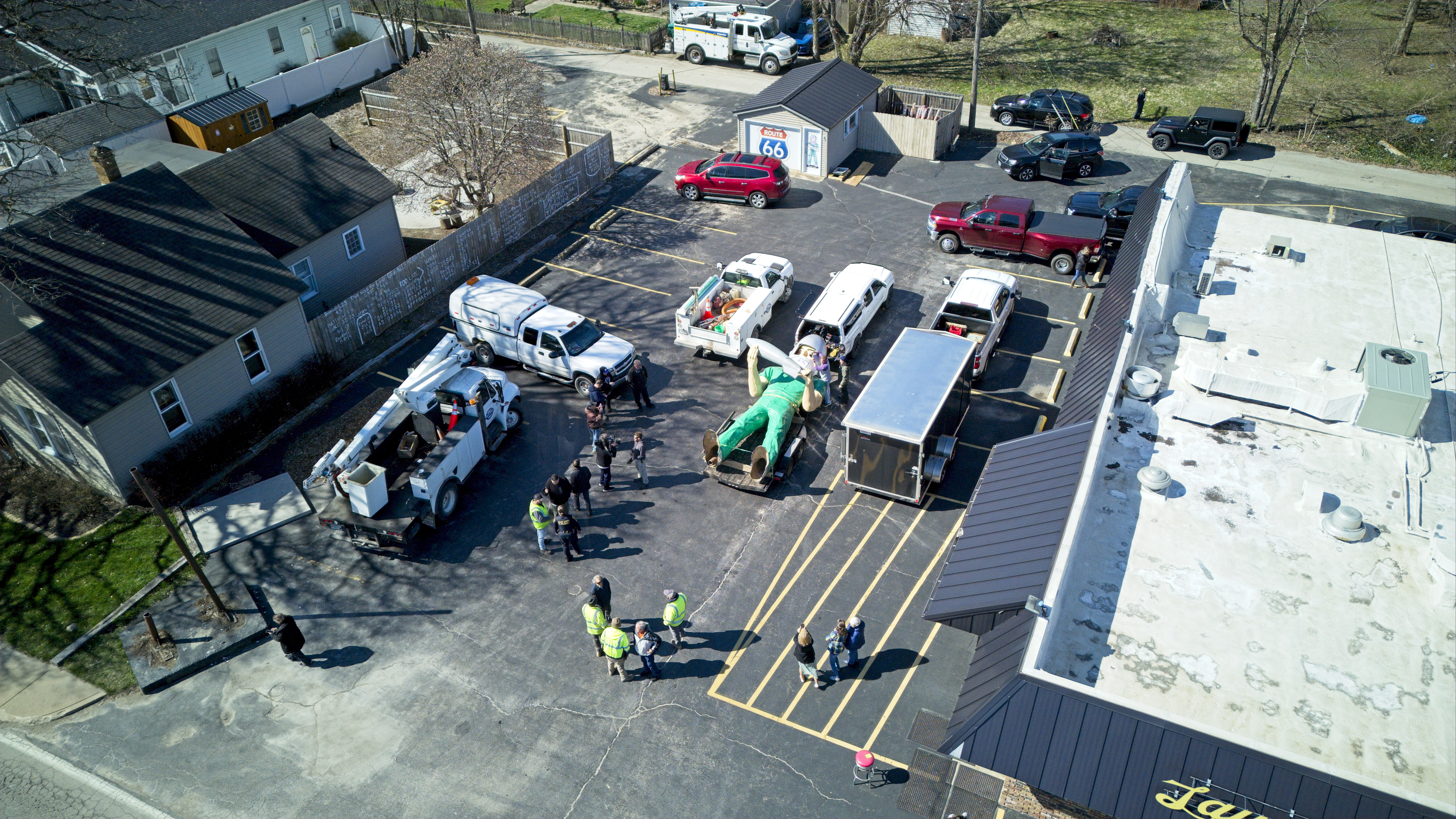
Removal of Gemini Giant from Launching Pad after auction

After a potential sale of the property to the Joliet Area Historical Museum (JAHM) for $420,000 fell through, the owner damaged the restaurant and littered the parking lot.

The Gemini Giant and contents of the restaurant were auctioned off on March 20, 2024. The Giant sold for $275,000. The winning bid was made by JAHM utilizing funds provided by a state grant. The Gemini Giant was removed from the Launching Pad on the same day, while the newly former owner made threats to sue JAHM to take the statue back. After removal, the Route 66 landmark was sent downstate for restoration. It was installed at its new home, the entrance to South Island Park in Wilmington, on November 29, 2024. The next day the City of Wilmington hosted a Gemini Giant Homecoming party celebrating its return.

The written agreement between JAHM and the City of Wilmington was initially a two year loan, later extended to February 2045.

A JAHM funded visitor center called The Landing Pad opened nearby in May 2025, named after the Gemini Giant’s former home.

== Trademark disputes ==
Immediately after the 2017 sale of the restaurant became public, Jeffrey Vilt of neighboring Coal City filed a trademark application for the phrase "Launching Pad Gemini Giant" for use on merchandise. He had no connection to the new owner. His application was eventually abandoned in 2021 after failing to submit the necessary documentation. A similar fate met the various applications submitted by the then owner. As of January 2026, no active trademarks exist for the Gemini Giant.
