= Wilmington, Illinois =

- City
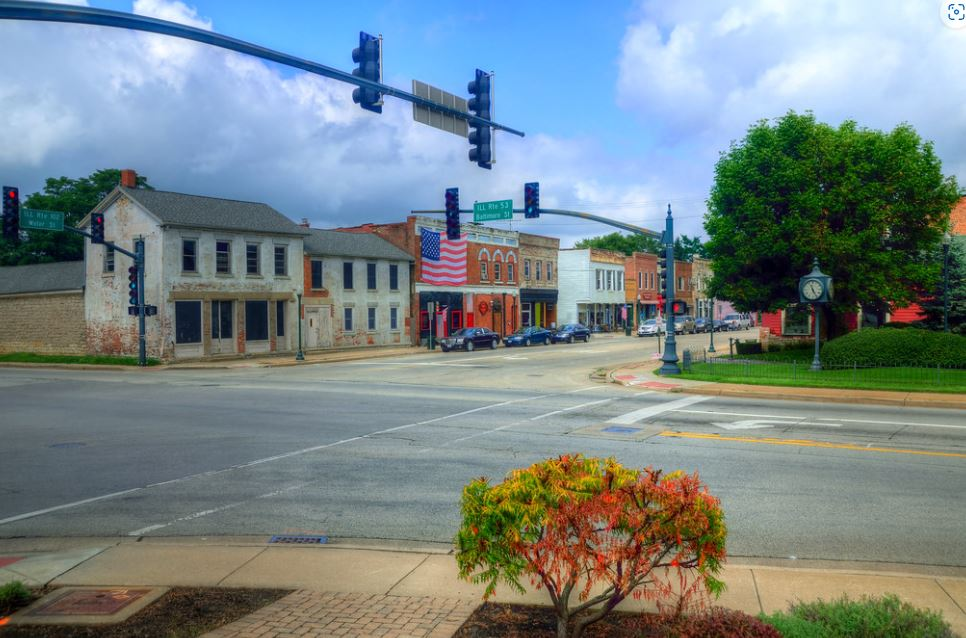
- Baltimore Street (IL-53)
- Nickname: The Island City
- Location of Wilmington in Will County, Illinois.
- Coordinates: 41°20′28″N 88°09′50″W
- Country: United States
- State: Illinois
- Counties: Will
- Founded: 1836
- Incorporated: 1854

Government
  - Mayor: Ben Dietz

Area
  - Total: 14.52 sq mi (37.61 km^{2})
  - Land: 13.80 sq mi (35.75 km^{2})
  - Water: 0.72 sq mi (1.86 km^{2})
- Elevation: 528 ft (161 m)

Population (2020)
  - Total: 5,664
  - Density: 410.4/sq mi (158.44/km^{2})
- Time zone: UTC-6 (CST)
  - Summer (DST): UTC-5 (CDT)
- ZIP code: 60481
- Area code: 815
- FIPS code: 17-82101
- GNIS feature ID: 2397328
- Website: wilmington-il.gov

Wilmington is a city in Will County, Illinois, United States. Located on Illinois Route 53 and Historic U.S. Route 66 along the east bank of the Kankakee River, it is approximately 60 miles (97 km) south-west from downtown Chicago. The population was 5,664 at the 2020 census. Wilmington is just south of Midewin National Tallgrass Prairie, which is home to the largest bison herd in the state.

== History ==
Before European settlers arrived, much of Illinois was inhabited by the Illinois Confederation, a coalition of related Native American tribes. Unlike today’s fixed borders, tribal territories often overlapped, with members from various groups sometimes living together in the same village. The Illiniwek, meaning ‘men’ in the Algonquian language, formed an alliance with the French, who adapted their name to the present-day ‘Illinois.’ The Illini Confederation’s territory extended from Iowa in the west to the Ohio River in the south, and approximately to the current borders with Indiana in the east and Wisconsin in the north. Their alliance with the French ultimately contributed to their decline, as the French lost control of the land to the British following the French and Indian War. The Miami tribe also inhabited northeastern Illinois. Other tribal names familiar to Illinois residents include Peoria, Potawatomi, Kaskaskia, and Ottawa.

Thomas Cox purchased land near Alden's Island in 1834 and built a sawmill, corn cracker, gristmill, and a carding machine facility all of which were powered by water wheels situated on a mill right off of the Kankakee River which runs through Wilmington.

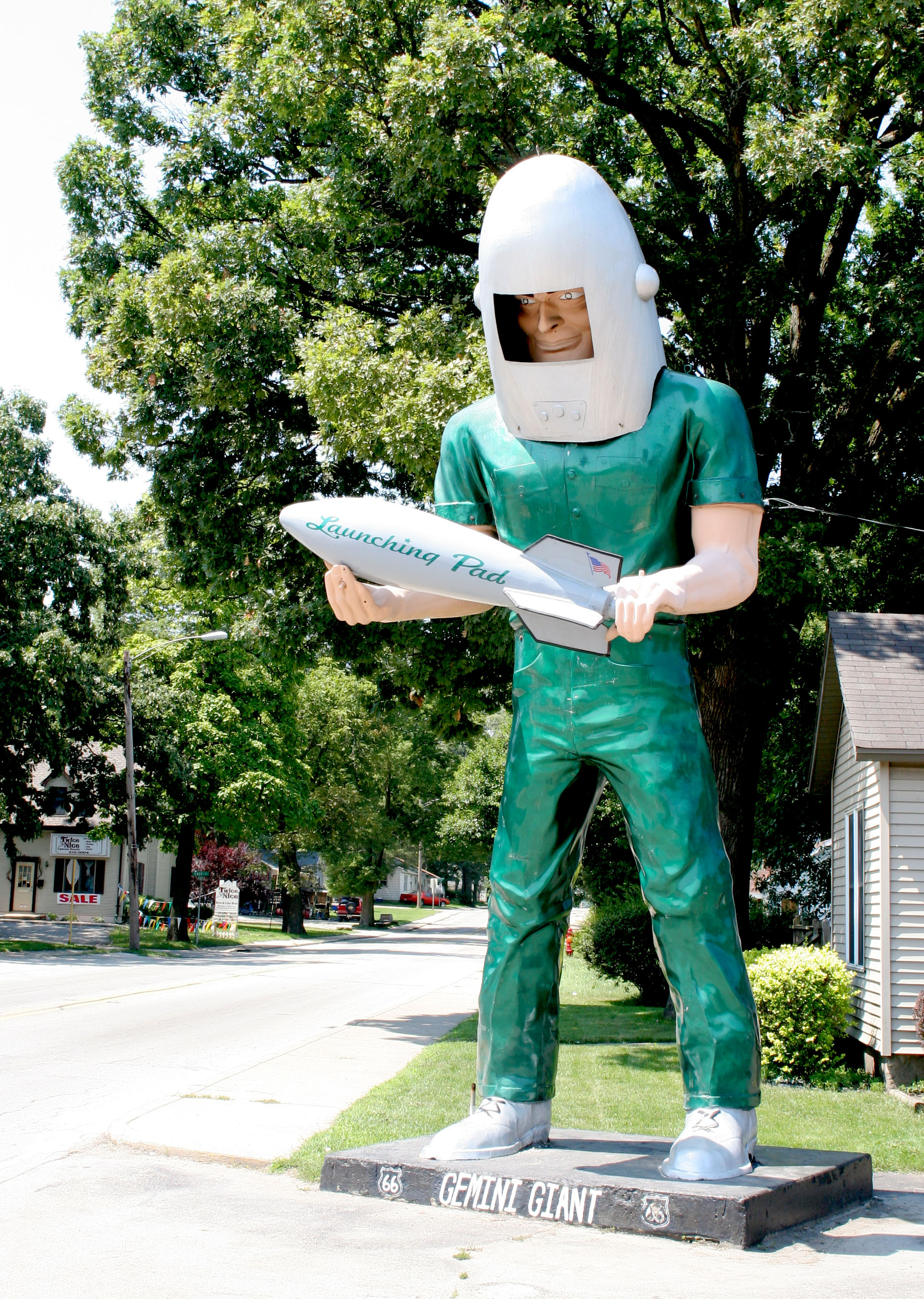
The Gemini Giant at its former location in Wilmington on U.S. Route 66

The city is home to the historic Eagle Hotel located on the northwest corner of state Rt 53 (Rt 66) and Water street (Rt 102). It later became famous as a stop on U.S. Route 66, which followed the route of modern-day Illinois Route 53. A notable attraction for travelers along this route is the Gemini Giant, a muffler man-type statue. Countless photos of travelers, both domestic and foreign, standing at the base of the Gemini Giant are taken each year. In March 2024, the Gemini Giant was moved to South Island Park.

Wilmington is also home to Cinder Ridge Golf Course, located off of I-55. Wilmington was the scene of the brutal murder of Riley Fox.

A mural depicting historic Downtown Wilmington was installed facing the Eagle Hotel in October 2023, in anticipation of the 100th anniversary of the establishment of Route 66 coming up in 2026.

== Geography ==
Wilmington is located on the banks of the Kankakee River, approximately 50 miles (80 km) southwest of Chicago and 15 miles (24 km) south of Joliet.

One of Wilmington's most notable geographical features is a large island in the Kankakee River, much of which is occupied by a city park. This island divides the river into a large channel and a smaller one which was used as a natural mill race during the early years of the city. The island is the source of the city's nickname, "The Island City."

According to the United States Census Bureau, the city has a total area of 4.5 square miles (12 km^{2}), of which 4.2 square miles (11 km^{2}) is land and 0.3 square miles (0.78 km^{2}) (6.86%) is water.

== Demographics ==
Historical population
Census	Pop.	Note	%±
1870	1,828		—
1880	1,872		2.4%
1890	1,576		−15.8%
1900	1,420		−9.9%
1910	1,450		2.1%
1920	1,384		−4.6%
1930	1,741		25.8%
1940	1,921		10.3%
1950	3,354		74.6%
1960	4,210		25.5%
1970	4,335		3.0%
1980	4,424		2.1%
1990	4,743		7.2%
2000	5,134		8.2%
2010	5,724		11.5%
2020	5,664		−1.0%
U.S. Decennial Census

=== Racial and ethnic composition ===
Wilmington city, Illinois – Racial and ethnic composition Note: the US Census treats Hispanic/Latino as an ethnic category. This table excludes Latinos from the racial categories and assigns them to a separate category. Hispanics/Latinos may be of any race.
Race / Ethnicity (NH = Non-Hispanic)	Pop 2000	Pop 2010	Pop 2020	% 2000	% 2010	% 2020
White alone (NH)	4,929	5,343	5,016	96.01%	93.34%	88.56%
Black or African American alone (NH)	38	46	64	0.74%	0.80%	1.13%
Native American or Alaska Native alone (NH)	17	12	16	0.33%	0.21%	0.28%
Asian alone (NH)	11	17	24	0.21%	0.30%	0.42%
Native Hawaiian or Pacific Islander alone (NH)	1	1	1	0.02%	0.02%	0.02%
Other race alone (NH)	1	2	14	0.02%	0.03%	0.25%
Mixed race or Multiracial (NH)	37	61	234	0.72%	1.07%	4.13%
Hispanic or Latino (any race)	100	242	295	1.95%	4.23%	5.21%
Total	5,134	5,724	5,664	100.00%	100.00%	100.00%

=== 2020 census ===
As of the 2020 census, Wilmington had a population of 5,664. The median age was 42.6 years. 19.8% of residents were under the age of 18 and 18.4% of residents were 65 years of age or older. For every 100 females there were 101.0 males, and for every 100 females age 18 and over there were 97.7 males age 18 and over.

92.1% of residents lived in urban areas, while 7.9% lived in rural areas.

There were 2,318 households in Wilmington, of which 27.7% had children under the age of 18 living in them. Of all households, 44.3% were married-couple households, 20.7% were households with a male householder and no spouse or partner present, and 26.8% were households with a female householder and no spouse or partner present. About 30.5% of all households were made up of individuals and 13.7% had someone living alone who was 65 years of age or older.

There were 2,475 housing units, of which 6.3% were vacant. The homeowner vacancy rate was 1.4% and the rental vacancy rate was 4.5%.

=== Income and poverty ===
The median income for a household in the city was $66,538. Males had a median income of $52,633 versus $32,783 for females. About 10.3% of the population were below the poverty line.

== Notable people ==
- Damien Anderson, National Football League player (born 1979)
- Harry Butcher, driver in the Indianapolis 500 (1892–1942)
- George Cutshaw, Major League Baseball player (1887–1973)
- John J. Feely, congressman (1875–1905)
- Leroy Ioas, Hand of the Cause of the Bahá'í Faith (1896–1965)
- Burt Keeley, Major League Baseball pitcher (1879–1952)
- Kiiara, singer (born 1995)
- Francis Joseph Magner, Roman Catholic bishop (1887–1947)
- Kelly Murphy (born 1989) Olympic Volleyball player
- Tanner Roark, Major League Baseball player (born 1986)
- Josephine Trott, composer (1874–1950)
