= List of settlements in Ogle County, Illinois =

This list of settlements in Ogle County, Illinois, United States, contains the names of incorporated cities in villages in the county, as well as unincorporated communities.

== Current communities ==
Image	Name	Type	Township	Area in miles (km^{2})	Date founded	Population
	Adeline	Village	Maryland Township	0.7 mi^{2} (1.81 km^{2})		139
	Baileyville	Unincorporated	Forreston Township			
	Brooks Isle	Unincorporated	Oregon-Nashua Township			
	Buffalo Grove	Unincorporated	Oregon-Nashua Township	NA	1830	NA
	Byron	City	Byron Township	6.4 mi^{2} (16.58 km^{2})		2,917
	Chana	Unincorporated	Pine Rock Township		1871	
	Creston	Village	Dement Township	1.1 mi^{2} (2.85 km^{2})		543
	Davis Junction	Village	Scott Township	9.8 mi^{2} (25.38 km^{2})		491
	Daysville	Unincorporated	Oregon-Nashua Township			
	Egan	Unincorporated	Leaf River Township			
	Flagg Center	Unincorporated	Flagg Township			
	Forreston	Village	Forreston Township	2.1 mi^{2} (5.44 km^{2})	1854	1,469
	Grand Detour	Unincorporated	Grand Detour Township			
	Haldane	Unincorporated	Lincoln Township			
	Harper	Unincorporated	Forreston Township			
	Hazelhurst	Unincorporated	Eagle Point Township			
	Hillcrest	Village	Flagg Township	0.6 mi^{2} (1.55 km^{2})		1,158
	Holcomb	Unincorporated	White Rock Township			
	Kings	Unincorporated	White Rock Township			
	Leaf River	Village	Leaf River Township	2.2 mi^{2} (5.7 km^{2})		555
	Lindenwood	Unincorporated	Lynnville Township			
	Monroe Center	Village	Monroe Township			504
	Mount Morris	Village	Mt. Morris Township	3.0 mi^{2} (7.77 km^{2})		3,013
	Oregon	City	Oregon-Nashua Township	2.1 mi^{2} (5.44 km^{2})		4,060
	Paynes Point	Unincorporated	Pine Rock Township			
	Polo	City	Buffalo Township	3.4 mi^{2} (8.81 km^{2})		2,477
	Rochelle	City	Flagg Township and Dement Township	19.4 mi^{2} (50.25 km^{2})		9,424
	Stillman Valley	Village	Marion Township	1.4 mi^{2} (3.63 km^{2})	1875	1,048
	Stratford	Unincorporated	Pine Creek Township			
	Woosung	Unincorporated	Woosung Township		June, 1855	

== See also ==
- Ogle County, Illinois
