= List of townships in Ogle County, Illinois =

This a complete list of townships in Ogle County, Illinois, United States.

== Current townships ==
Image	Name	Date organized	Population*	Area in miles (km^{2})	City/Village	Remarks
	Brookville Township	November 6, 1849	253			
	Buffalo Township	November 6, 1849	2,941			
	Byron Township	November 6, 1849	5,840			
	Dement Township	February 13, 1856	825			
	Eagle Point Township	September, 1869	249			
	Flagg Township	November 6, 1849	13,276			
	Forreston Township	March 4, 1857				
	Grand Detour Township	November 6, 1849				
	LaFayette Township	November 6, 1849				
	Leaf River Township	November 6, 1849				
	Lincoln Township	September, 1869				
	Lynnville Township	November 6, 1849				
	Marion Township	November 6, 1849				
	Maryland Township	November 12, 1850				
	Monroe Township	November 6, 1849				
	Mt. Morris Township	November 6, 1849				
	Oregon-Nashua Township	November 6, 1849				
	Pine Creek Township	November 6, 1849				
	Pine Rock Township	November 12, 1850				
	Rockvale Township	November 12, 1850	1,748			
	Scott Township	November 6, 1849	1,671			
	Taylor Township	November 6, 1849	784			
	White Rock Township	November 6, 1849	709			
	Woosung Township	September 15, 1880	392			

== See also ==
- Ogle County, Illinois
- Township
