= Chana School =

- U.S. National Register of Historic Places
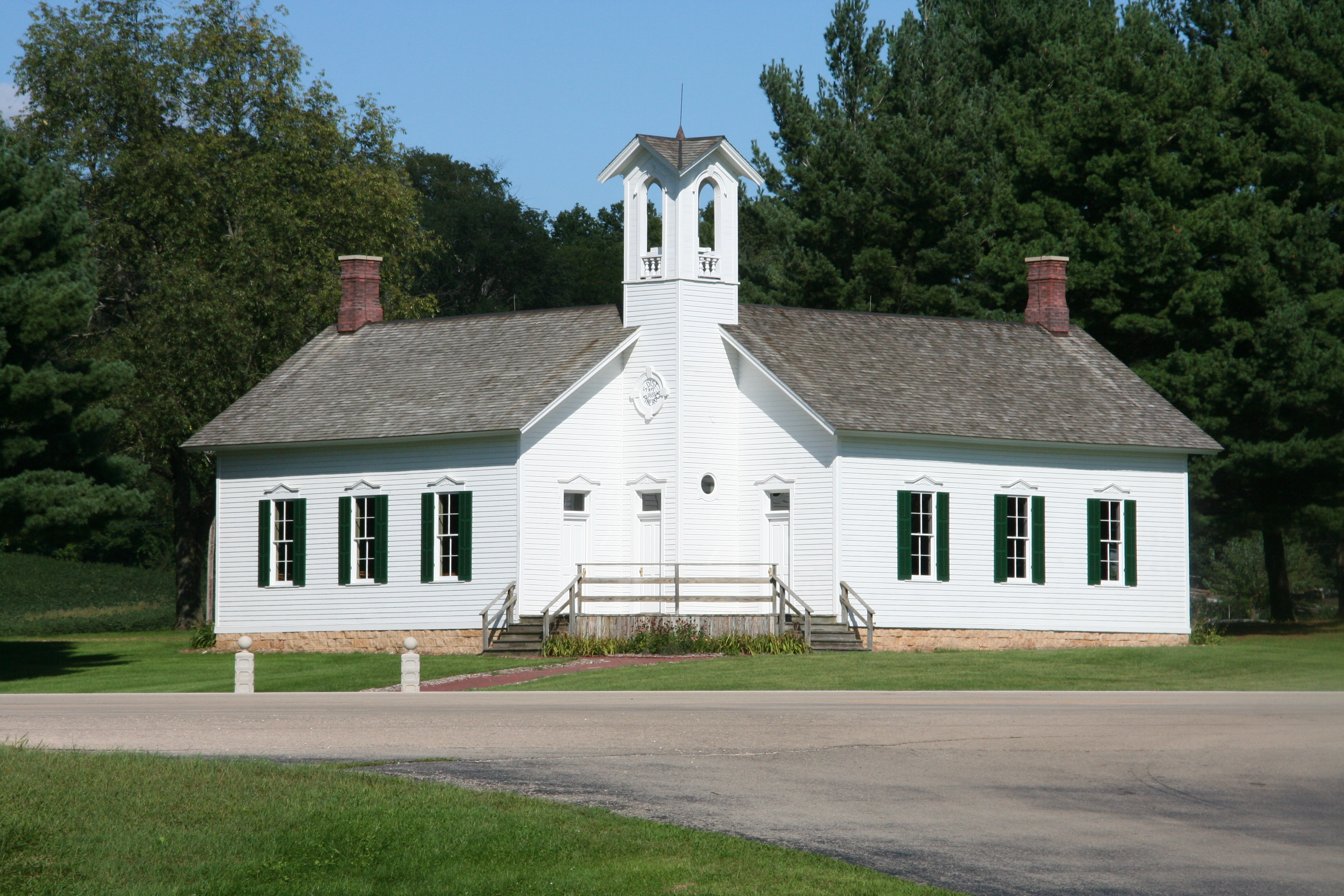
- Chana School is an example of a fully restored two-room schoolhouse in Oregon, Illinois.

- Location within Illinois Location within the United States
- Location: Oregon, Ogle County, Illinois, U.S.
- Coordinates: 42°01′03.58″N 89°19′26.26″W
- Area: 8 acres (3.2 ha)
- Built: 1883
- Architect: Joel Haymaker
- Architectural style: Italianate
- NRHP reference No.: 05001369
- Added to NRHP: December 6, 2005

Chana School is a Registered Historic Place in Ogle County, Illinois, in the county seat of Oregon, Illinois. One of six Oregon sites listed on the Register, the school is an oddly shaped, two-room schoolhouse which has been moved from its original location. Chana School joined the Register in 2005 as an education museum.

The schoolhouse was built in 1883, in the village of Chana, Illinois. Due to the elimination of the Chana School District, the school was abandoned by the 1960s. A restoration effort was undertaken in the late 1990s, ending with a move and refurbishment in 2002 and 2003. The building now stands in a public park along the Rock River in Oregon, Illinois. Its interior also features architectural elements which set it apart from the typical 19th-century schoolhouse. From a distance, the building is dominated by its bell tower.

== History ==
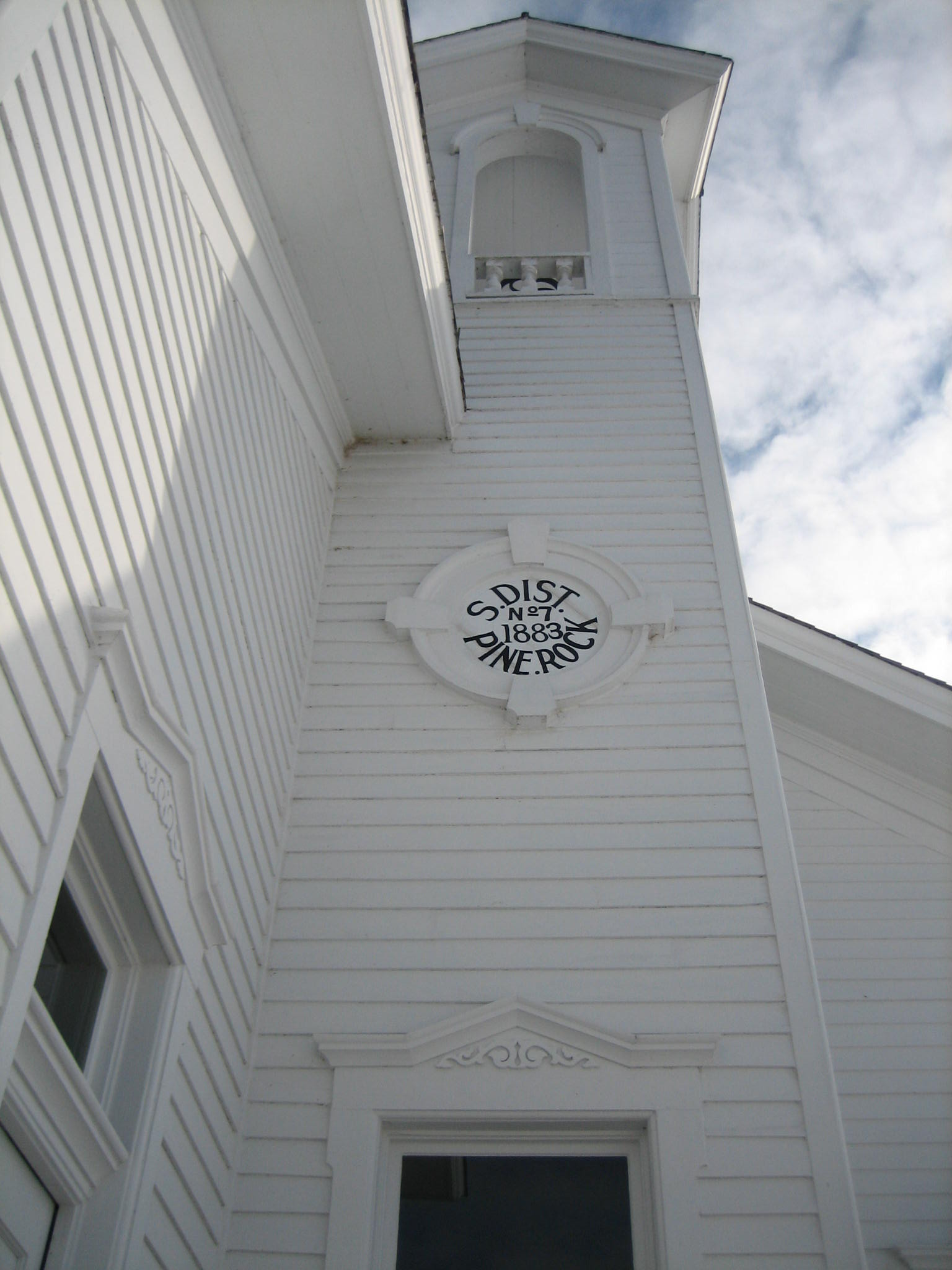
The bell tower of the 1883 Chana School.

The Chana Pine Rock School was founded in 1883. It operated until 1953, when the school was retired. It was the only wooden, two-room schoolhouse built in the area. One of the two classrooms was used by students in lower grades, the other by older students, up to eighth grade. Through the late early 1950s, one classroom was still used and the additional space used for storage.

=== Early years ===
The village of Chana was founded in 1871, half a mile northwest of White Oak School, which was built in 1869. Chana's early settlers sent their children to White Oak School up to eighth grade, but White Oak was abandoned in 1883 when Chana School was built in a park in Chana. The White Oak building was used as a storage barn for hay until a fire destroyed it in 1886. In 1893, a second classroom was added to the existing structure of Chana School.

Chana's first teacher was D.C. Sears, an Oregon, Illinois resident. The late 19th century saw at least ten individuals teach at Chana School at different times. By 1888, Pine Rock Township was ready to address the question of whether or not to build a high school; Chana students attended high school in Oregon. The question was brought to a vote but failed and Chana students continued to go to Oregon schools after eighth grade.

=== After closing ===
After the school closed in 1953, the larger, original room was converted into a bus garage by the Chana School District. A large garage door was cut into the building and the floor completely removed. The smaller, 1893 room became a storage area. In 1962, the Chana School District ran out of room and used the building as an overflow classroom. By the mid-1960s, the Chana District folded and was absorbed by the Oregon School District. Residents were allowed to remove any items from the school after the district shut down.

=== Restoration ===
In 1997, the property was sold and the Chana School was nearly demolished. Citizens formed the Chana School Foundation to save the building. It was relocated to City Park East in Oregon, Illinois and volunteers began the process of refurbishing the building in August 1998. Five years later, in September 2003, the school had its grand opening. Since then, it has operated as a museum to help illustrate 1880s education in the United States.

The moving and restoration of the Chana School was facilitated, in part, by a US$15,000 grant from the Illinois Department of Natural Resources. The grant was intended to help restore the building to its original state, restore a sand hill prairie on the site, develop museum exhibit space, and establish learning links to other museums in support of "the rural education focus" as part of the curriculum.

== Architecture ==
Chana School is, on one hand, typical of rural schoolhouses, with a gabled roof and trademark bell tower. On the other hand, the building is unique among 19th-century schoolhouses. It does have some stylistic elements, mostly of the Italianate style. Examples include pedimented window crows and pronounced hoods over the belfry openings. However, Chana School's architectural difference lies in its design and, thus, its floor plan.

=== Exterior ===
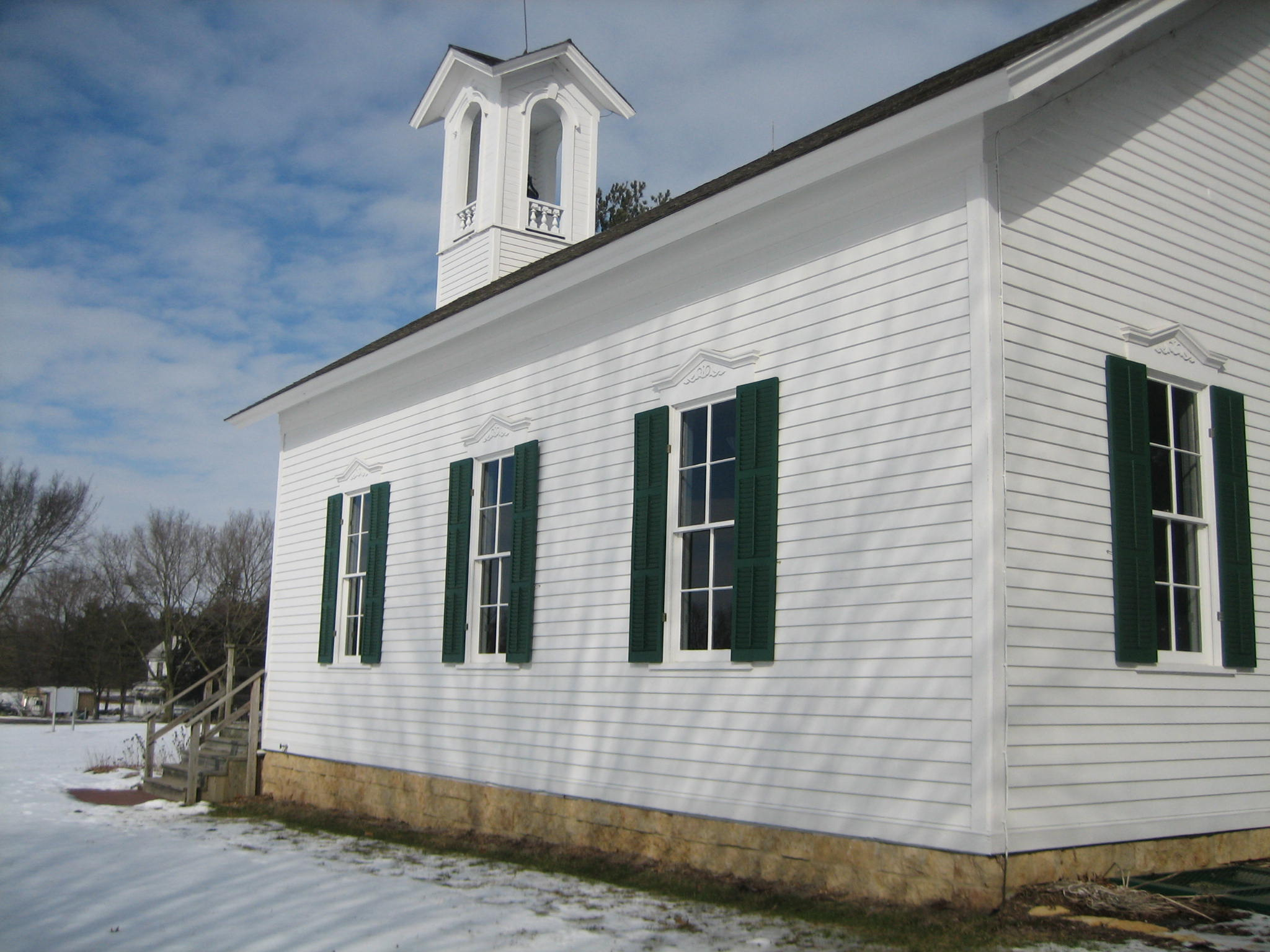
The arches and balustrades are visible, as well as four of the windows.

The building is designed in the Italianate style, with the specialty leanings demanded by a schoolhouse. The front facade, which faces southwest today, is adorned with three doorways—left, right, and center— which span a front porch beneath the bell tower. When the school was open, the use of the doors was restricted. The left and right doors were used by boys in first through eighth grades while the middle door was earmarked as an entry for girls of all ages. Each of the doors feature transoms topped with cornices.

The bell tower rises 43 feet (13 m), and halfway up its length is a large round sign. The sign denotes the school district, Pine Rock, and the year of the school's foundation. Originally, the sign graced the front exterior wall of the larger of the two rooms. The tower rises above the roof by about fifteen feet and at its top are four arches, one on each side. Wooden construction is found throughout the tower, its arches, and the rest of the schoolhouse, save the limestone and cement foundation. At the bottom of each of the four arches are balustrades decorated with spindles. Inside the tower is the school bell. The bell house is topped with a multi-gabled roof. The roof of the overall schoolhouse is covered with cedar shingles and features chimneys rising from each of the classrooms.

The building's southern facade, that of the original 1883 room, features three windows. The same room has two rear windows of the same style. The windows are all double hung and of four-over-four design.

=== Interior ===
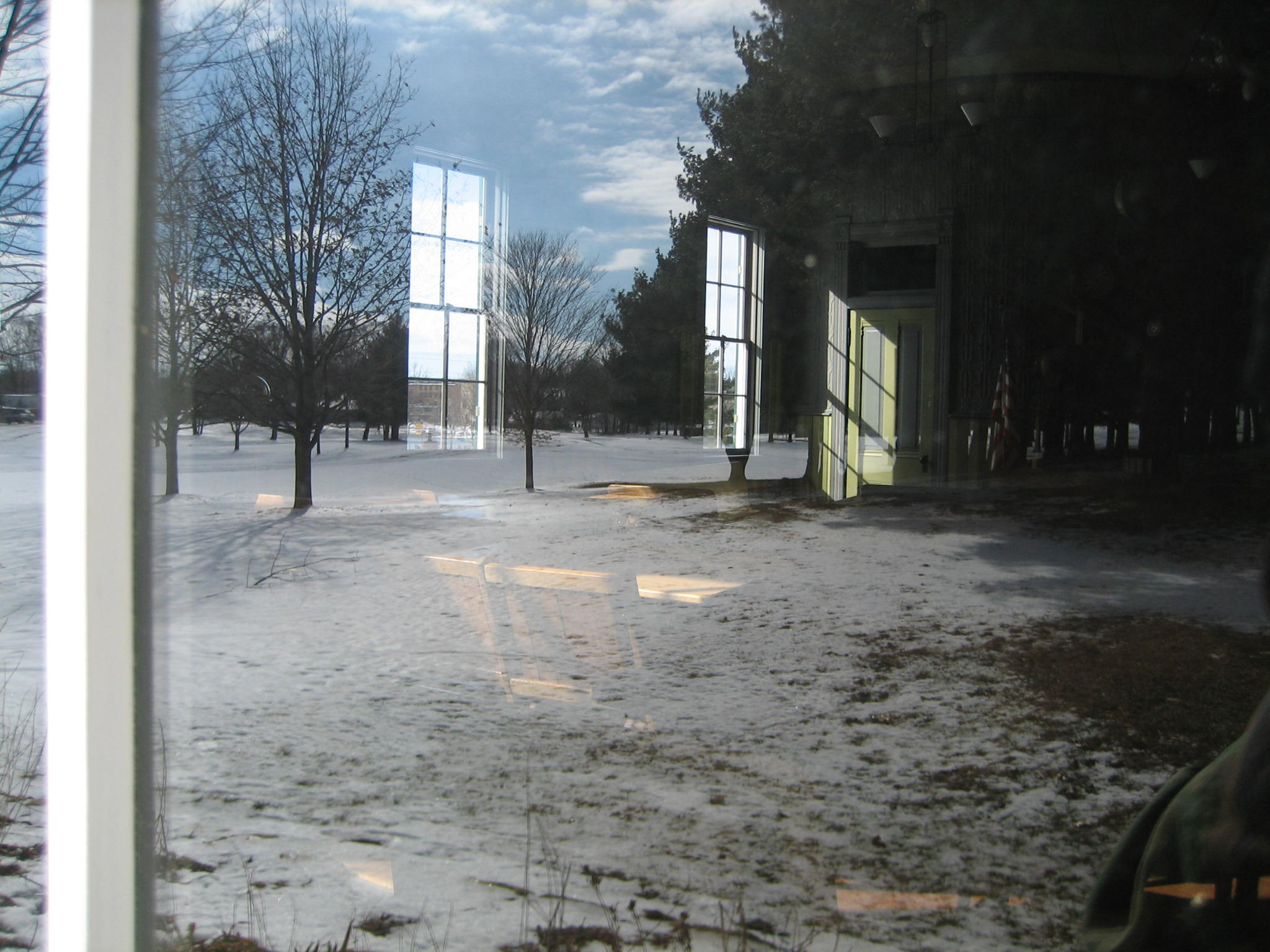
The four-over-four double-hung windows are visible through the exterior glass.

The south entrance to the larger room is Chana School's most original portion. A pinewood floor, original closet, built-in water stand, and pressed tin on the ceiling are among the original features found in this portion of the building. The interior of the bell tower is adorned with shelving, coat hooks, and two exits; one into the smaller classroom and the other, between the semi-circular walls, to the coat room. The bell rope hangs 14.5 feet (4.4 m) from the ceiling.

The interior of the 1883 room has been restored to its original appearance. The red oak floor is trimmed by nine inches of mop board and quarter-round, decoratively accented. The two curved and semi-circular front walls mark the two coat rooms in the original, one-room building. The rounded walls hold a chair rail and are wainscoted below the blackboards. Blackboards cover available space on the north, east, and south walls. Pressed tin extends over the ceiling and is used as a crown molding around the room on the walls from the ceiling to the top of the blackboards.

The second, newer room has also been fully restored as a schoolroom and is currently being used as a museum. The rectangular room features a half chimney, partial original oak floors, and original blackboards which are set lower for smaller children.

=== Unique features ===
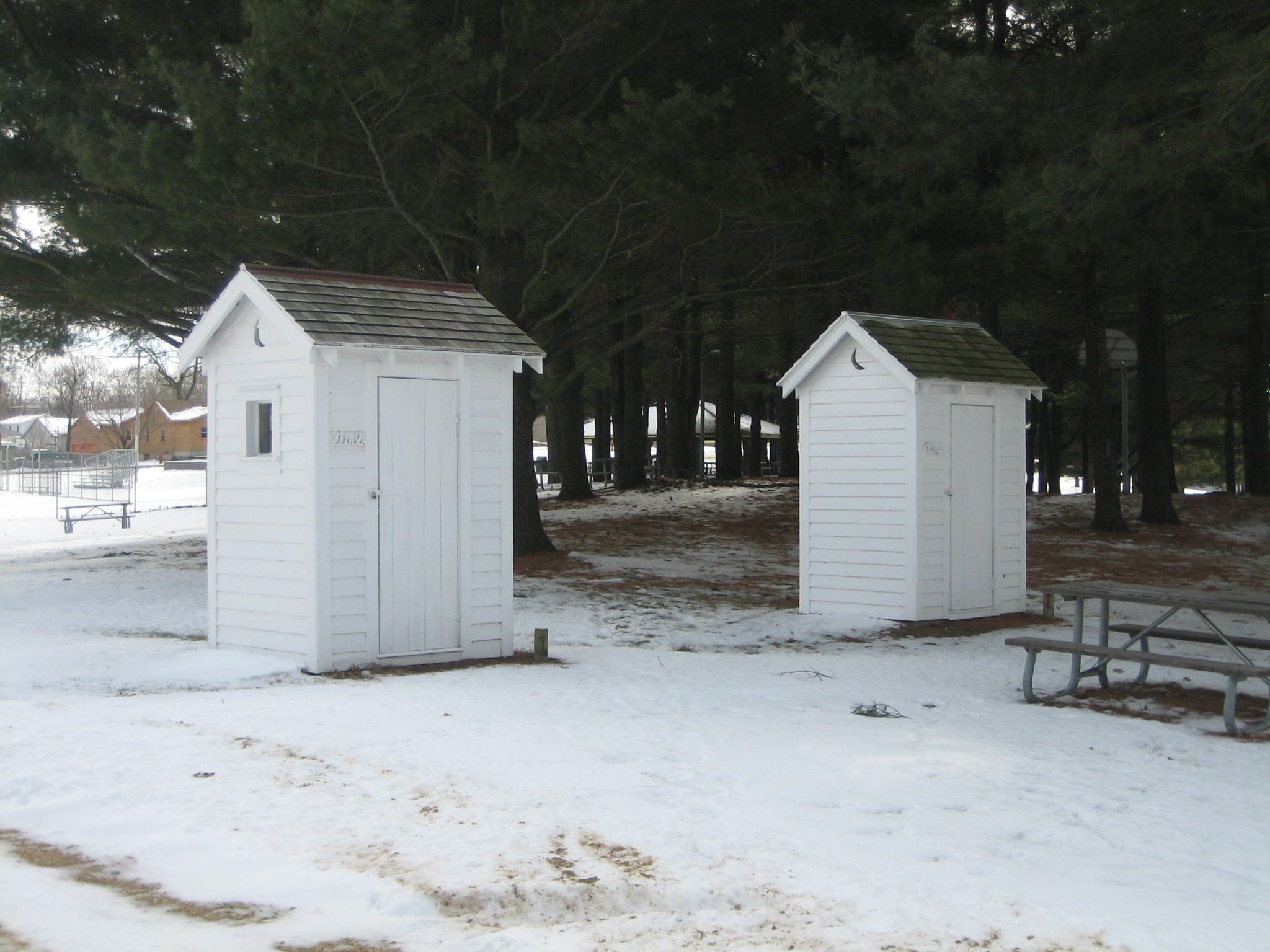
These outhouses are the only other buildings at the Chana School site.

This building, at least among schoolhouses from the time period (1880s), is architecturally unique in two ways. One feature that sets this structure apart from most rural schoolhouses of the day is the building's design. Chana School started off as a simple, run-of-the-mill, one-room schoolhouse. Ten years later, however, an addition to the building attached a second, smaller classroom, perpendicular to the original. The bell tower was then constructed to connect the two rooms. The result was a unique layout resembling an "L" with its corner shaved off. Inside the building is another unique feature for schoolhouses of the time—the coat rooms are surrounded by two semi-circular front walls in the original wing of the building.

== Outbuildings ==
The only other buildings on the site are two outhouses, located to the rear of the school building. Both are non-functional, display models. One outhouse is an original 1870s structure, transported to the site and reassembled. The other outhouse is a copy, built from salvaged materials during the school restoration. Neither outhouse is historically associated with Chana School and both are considered non-contributing factors in the schoolhouse's National Register of Historic Places listing.

== Significance ==
Chana School was added to the National Register of Historic Places on December 6, 2005. On its original nomination form to the National Register, Chana School was cited as being significant for inclusion in the Register under criteria C, which states a property: "embod(ies) the distinctive characteristics of a type, period, or method of construction, or that represent the work of a master, or that possess high artistic values, or that represent a significant and distinguishable entity whose components may lack individual distinction." In addition, the school was subject to considerations by the Register which allowed its inclusion despite the general policy which does not encourage the nomination of properties that have been moved from their original location.

== See also ==
- One-room schoolhouse
