= Harper, Illinois =

- Unincorporated community
- Location within Illinois Location within the United States
- Coordinates: 42°08′29″N 89°38′50″W
- Country: United States
- State: Illinois
- County: Ogle
- Elevation: 938 ft (286 m)
- Time zone: UTC-6 (Central (CST))
  - Summer (DST): UTC-5 (CDT)
- Area codes: 815 & 779
- GNIS feature ID: 409820

Harper is an unincorporated community in Ogle County, Illinois, United States.
