= Robert R. Canfield =

American lawyer and politician

Member of the Illinois House of Representatives

Personal details
- Party: Republican

Robert Roe Canfield (May 12, 1909 – September 1, 1994) was an American lawyer and politician.

Born in Chana, Illinois, Canfield graduated from Rochelle Township High School in Rochelle, Illinois, He graduated from Cornell College and Northwestern University Pritzker School of Law. In 1934, Canfield was admitted to the Illinois bar. He practiced law in Rockford, Illinois and served as state's attorney for Winnebago County, Illinois from 1948 to 1956. Canfield served in the Illinois Senate from 1956 to 1964 and was a Republican. In 1964, he ran for the office if Illinois Attorney General and lost the election. However, Canfield served in the Illinois House of Representatives from 1965 to 1967. He served in the 1970 Illinois Constitutional Convention. Canfield died at Swedish American Hospital in Rockford, Illinois.
