= Holcomb, Illinois =

Unincorporated community in Illinois, US

- Unincorporated community
- Location within Illinois Location within the United States
- Coordinates: 42°03′52″N 89°05′49″W
- Country: United States
- State: Illinois
- County: Ogle

Area
  - Total: 0.089 sq mi (0.23 km^{2})
  - Land: 0.089 sq mi (0.23 km^{2})
  - Water: 0 sq mi (0.00 km^{2})
- Elevation: 846 ft (258 m)

Population (2020)
  - Total: 149
  - Density: 1,678.5/sq mi (648.09/km^{2})
- Time zone: UTC-6 (Central (CST))
  - Summer (DST): UTC-5 (CDT)
- ZIP code: 61043
- Area codes: 815 & 779
- GNIS feature ID: 2806499

Holcomb is an unincorporated community in Ogle County, Illinois, United States. As of the 2020 census, Holcomb had a population of 149. Holcomb is 3 miles (4.8 km) south of Davis Junction. Holcomb has a post office with ZIP code 61043. Holcomb was founded in 1876. It was named for William H. Holcomb (c. 1839–1908), General Manager of the Chicago and Iowa Railroad at the time. He was also the Superintendent of Transportation for the World's Columbian Exposition held in Chicago in 1893.

== Demographics ==
Historical population
Census	Pop.	Note	%±
2020	149		—
U.S. Decennial Census

Holcomb first appeared as a census-designated place in the 2020 U.S. census.

== Education ==
It is in the Kings Consolidated School District 144 and the Rochelle Township High School District 212.

== Gallery ==
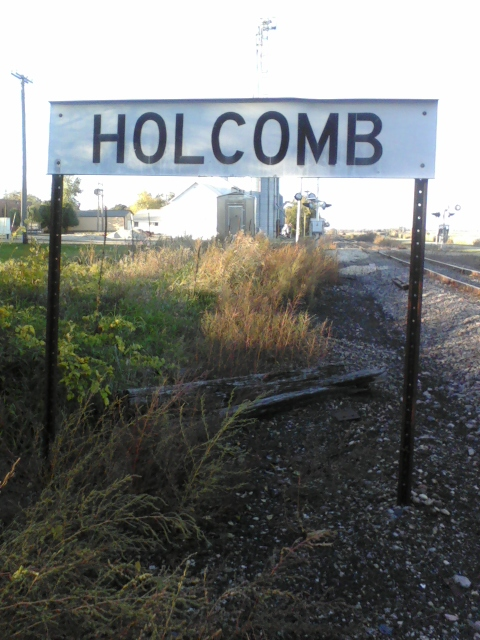
The railroad sign for Holcomb. As viewed looking North

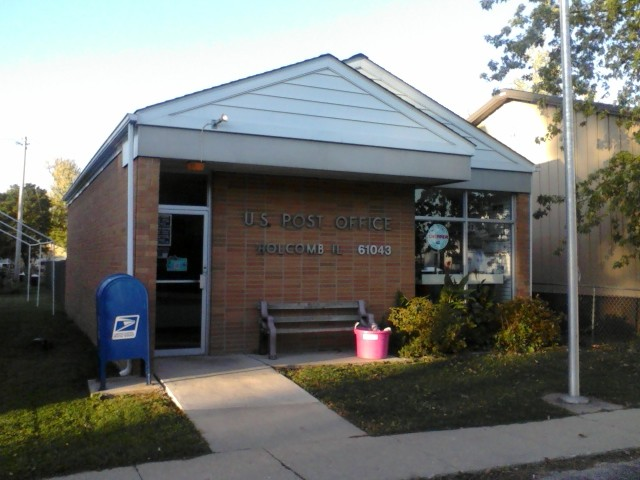
The Holcomb Post Office

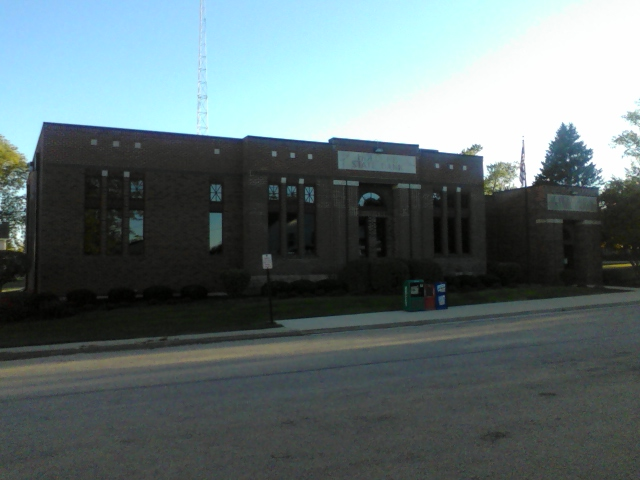
The Holcomb State Bank

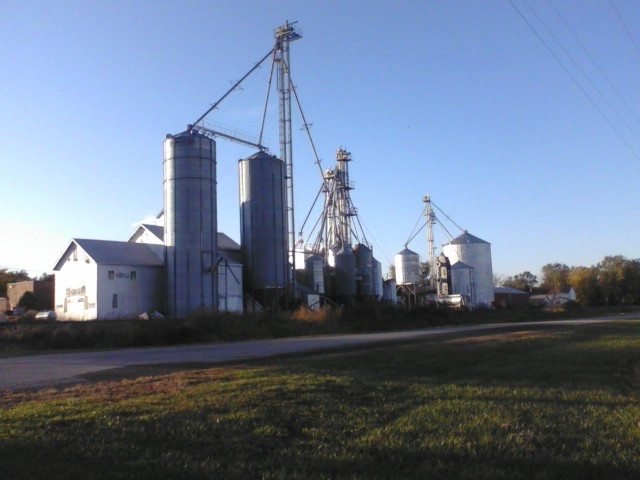
The Hueber Grain Elevators. As seen looking West. Can be seen throughout village.

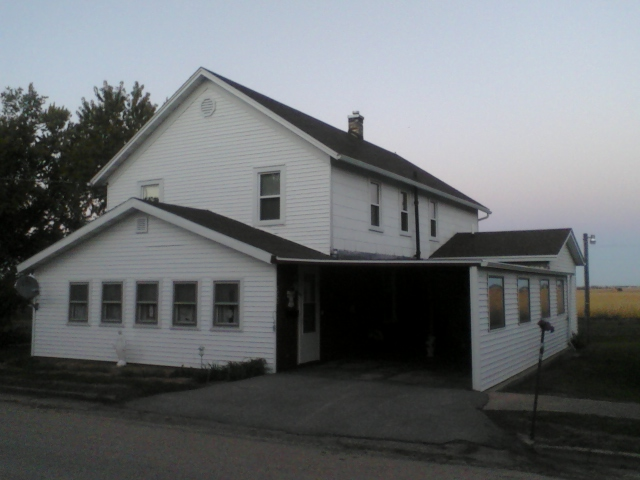
The Original Holcomb Hotel & General Store. Now a residence.

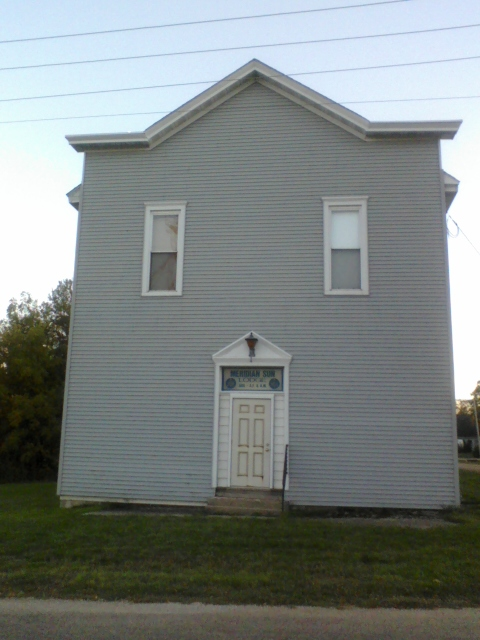
The Meridian Sun #505 Masonic Lodge

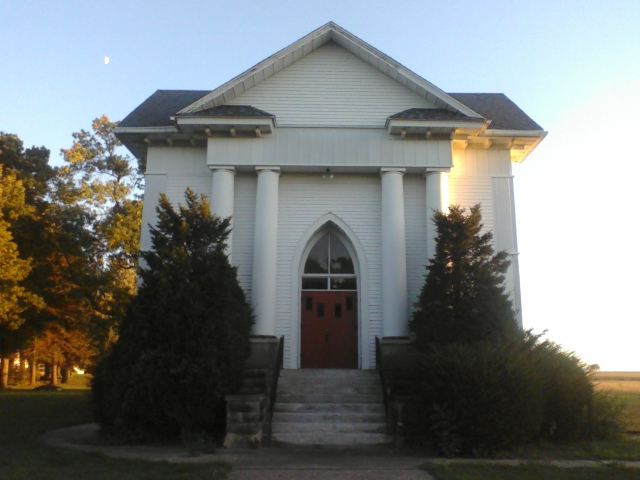
Former Church

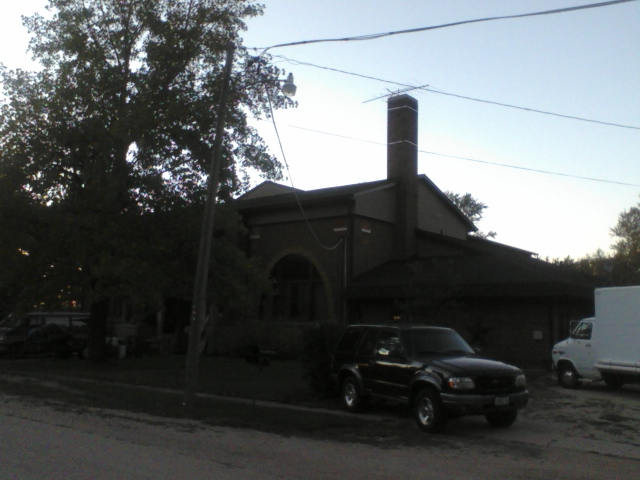
The former Holcomb Carrie Sheaff School District 152 Building

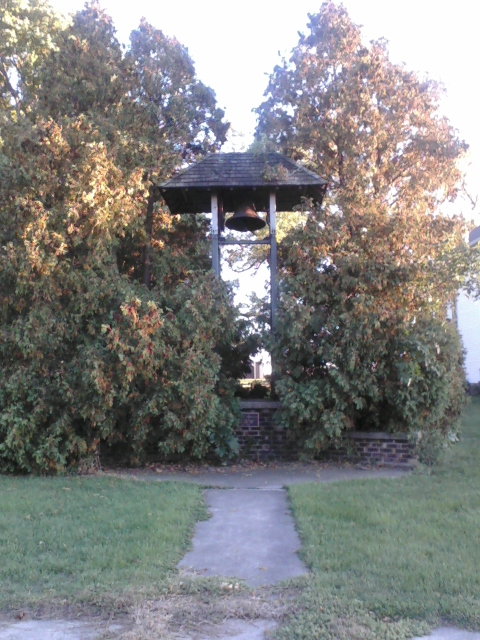
The Holcomb Centennial Bell, erected in 1976

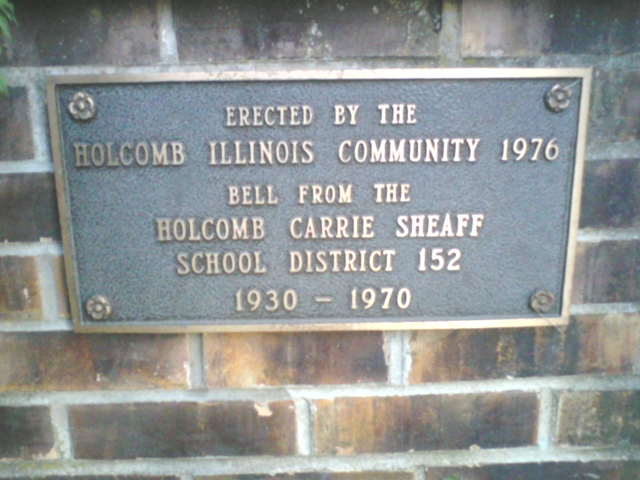
The plaque on the Centennial Bell
