= Paynes Point, Illinois =

Paynes Point
- Unincorporated community
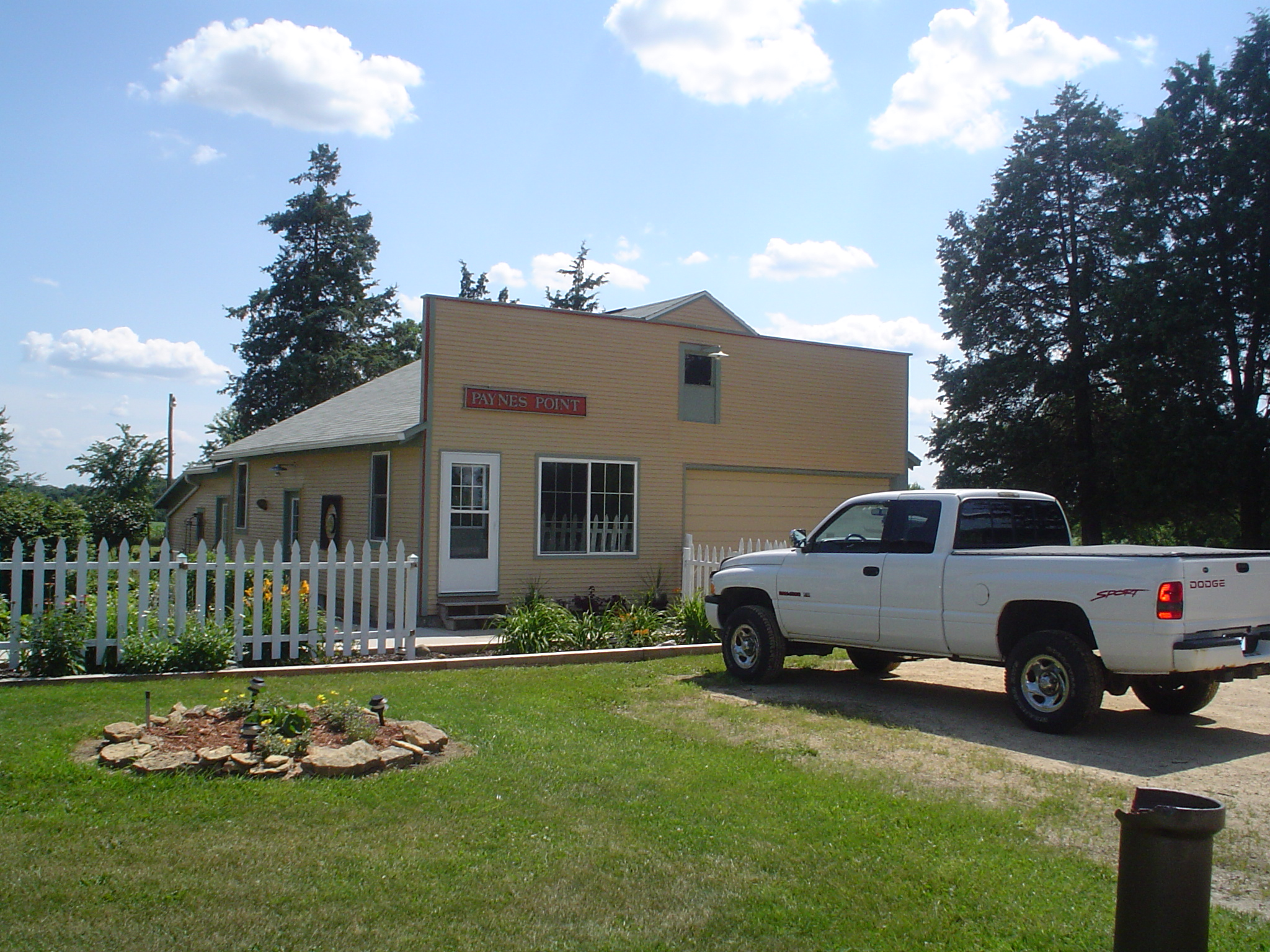
- The only store in Paynes Point

- Location within Ogle County Paynes Point (Illinois)
- Coordinates: 42°01′26″N 89°12′24″W
- Country: United States
- State: Illinois
- County: Ogle
- Township: Pine Rock
- Elevation: 902 ft (275 m)
- Time zone: UTC-6 (CST)
  - Summer (DST): UTC-5 (CDT)
- Zip code: 61061
- Area codes: 815/779
- GNIS feature ID: 2393914

Paynes Point is an unincorporated community in Ogle County, Illinois, united States and is located south of Stillman Valley and east of Oregon. The community prospered in the 1970s and 1980s.

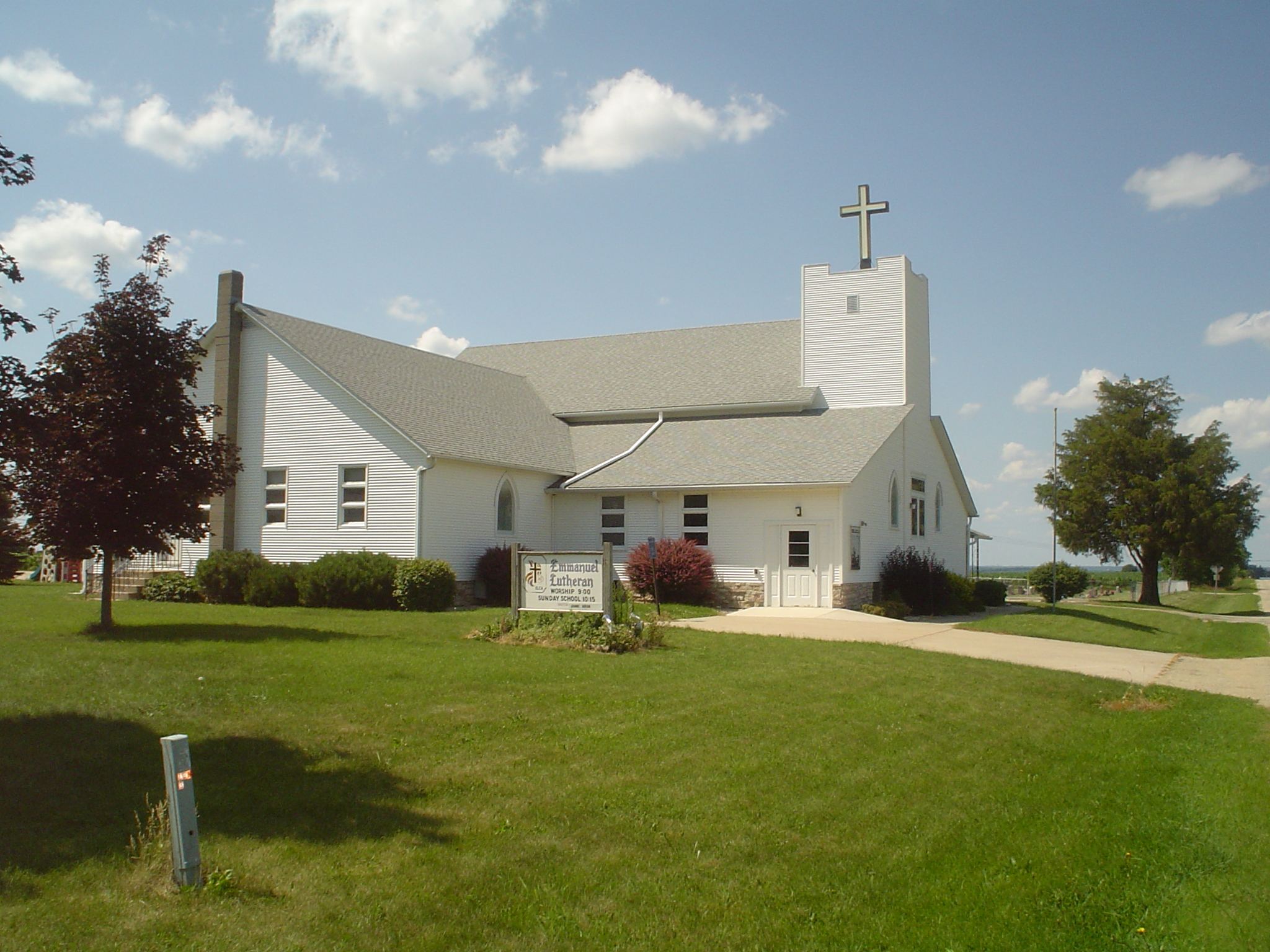
Emmanuel Lutheran church in Paynes Point
