= Rochelle Township High School =

Location
- 1401 Flagg Road; Rochelle, Illinois 61068; United States; 41°56′31″N 89°4′38″W

Information
- School district: Rochelle Township High School District 212
- Superintendent: Dr. Jason Harper
- Principal: Dr. Chris Lewis
- Enrollment: 893 (2018-19)
- Colors: Purple and white
- Athletics conference: I-8
- Nickname: Hubs
- Website: www.rochelleschools.org/o/rths

Rochelle Township High School, commonly referred to as RTHS, is a secondary school located in Rochelle, Illinois. RTHS is the only school operated by Rochelle Township High School District 212.

The district includes portions of Ogle, Lee, and DeKalb counties. Communities in Ogle County in this district include Rochelle, Creston, Hillcrest, Holcomb, and Kings. In Lee County, the district includes Steward.

Approximately one-half of the students come from Rochelle Community Consolidated District 231, which includes the middle school and elementary schools in Rochelle proper. The remaining student population comes from a variety of other elementary school districts in the area.

Despite its name, the school is located in Flagg Township; there is no township named "Rochelle" within Ogle County, nor anywhere else in the United States, for that matter.

== History ==
RTHS was originally built in 1918, with nearly a dozen additions built on over the next 80 years, the entire edifice was replaced in 2004 with a new building, located about a mile north of the old one.

== Demographics ==
The demographic breakdown of the 893 students enrolled in 2018-2019 was:

- Male - 51.8%
- Female - 48.2%
- Native American/Alaskan - 0.4%
- Asian/Pacific islanders - 0.4%
- Black - 2.1%
- Hispanic - 35.5%
- White - 59%
- Multiracial - 2.5%

== Athletics ==
The colors of the RTHS Hubs are purple and white.

For most of its history, the Rochelle Hubs competed in the North Central Illinois Conference. Rochelle was a founding member of the NCIC in 1929, but left the conference in 2006 for the newly formed Western Sun Conference. This affiliation was short lived, and from 2011 to 2019, the Hubs competed as members of the Northern Illinois Big 12 Conference. Then, for the 2019-2020 school year, they joined the Interstate Eight Conference with Sycamore, LaSalle-Peru, Ottawa, Morris, Sandwich, Plano, and Kaneland.

The following IHSA sanctioned sports are offered at RTHS:

- Baseball (boys)
- Basketball (boys & girls)
- Bowling (boys & girls)
- Competitive cheer (girls)
- Competitive dance (girls)
- Cross country (boys & girls)
- Football (boys)
- Golf (boys & girls)
- Soccer (boys & girls)
- Softball (girls)
- Tennis (boys & girls)
- Track and field (boys & girls)
- Volleyball (girls)
- Wrestling (boys)

== Other sanctioned interscholastic competitors ==
Besides athletics, RTHS competes in IHSA events in the following:

- Bass fishing
- Band
- Scholastic bowl
- Speech
- Vocal music

== Notable alumni ==
- Joan Allen (1974), actress
- Stan Campbell, lineman for 1952 and 1957 NFL champion Detroit Lions
- Scot Hollonbeck, wheelchair racer
