= Grand Detour Township, Illinois =

Coordinates: 41°55′11″N 89°25′41″W

Grand Detour Township
- Township
- Location in the county of Ogle County.
- Country: United States
- State: Illinois
- County: Ogle

Government
  - Supervisor: Francis Drew, Jr

Area
  - Total: 11.49 sq mi (29.8 km^{2})
  - Land: 10.91 sq mi (28.3 km^{2})
  - Water: 0.58 sq mi (1.5 km^{2}) 5.05%

Population (2010)
  - Estimate (2016): 671
  - Density: 64/sq mi (25/km^{2})
- Time zone: UTC-6 (CST)
  - Summer (DST): UTC-5 (CDT)
- FIPS code: 17-141-30718

Grand Detour Township is located in Ogle County, Illinois. As of the 2010 census, its population was 698 and it contained 385 housing units. It contains the census-designated place of Grand Detour.

== Geography ==
According to the 2010 census, the township has a total area of 11.49 square miles (29.8 km^{2}), of which 10.91 square miles (28.3 km^{2}) (or 94.95%) is land and 0.58 square miles (1.5 km^{2}) (or 5.05%) is water. The township's land use is predominantly agriculture with single-family residential uses in the southeastern portion of the township.

== Demographics ==
Historical population
Census	Pop.	Note	%±
2016 (est.)	671
U.S. Decennial Census

== Government ==
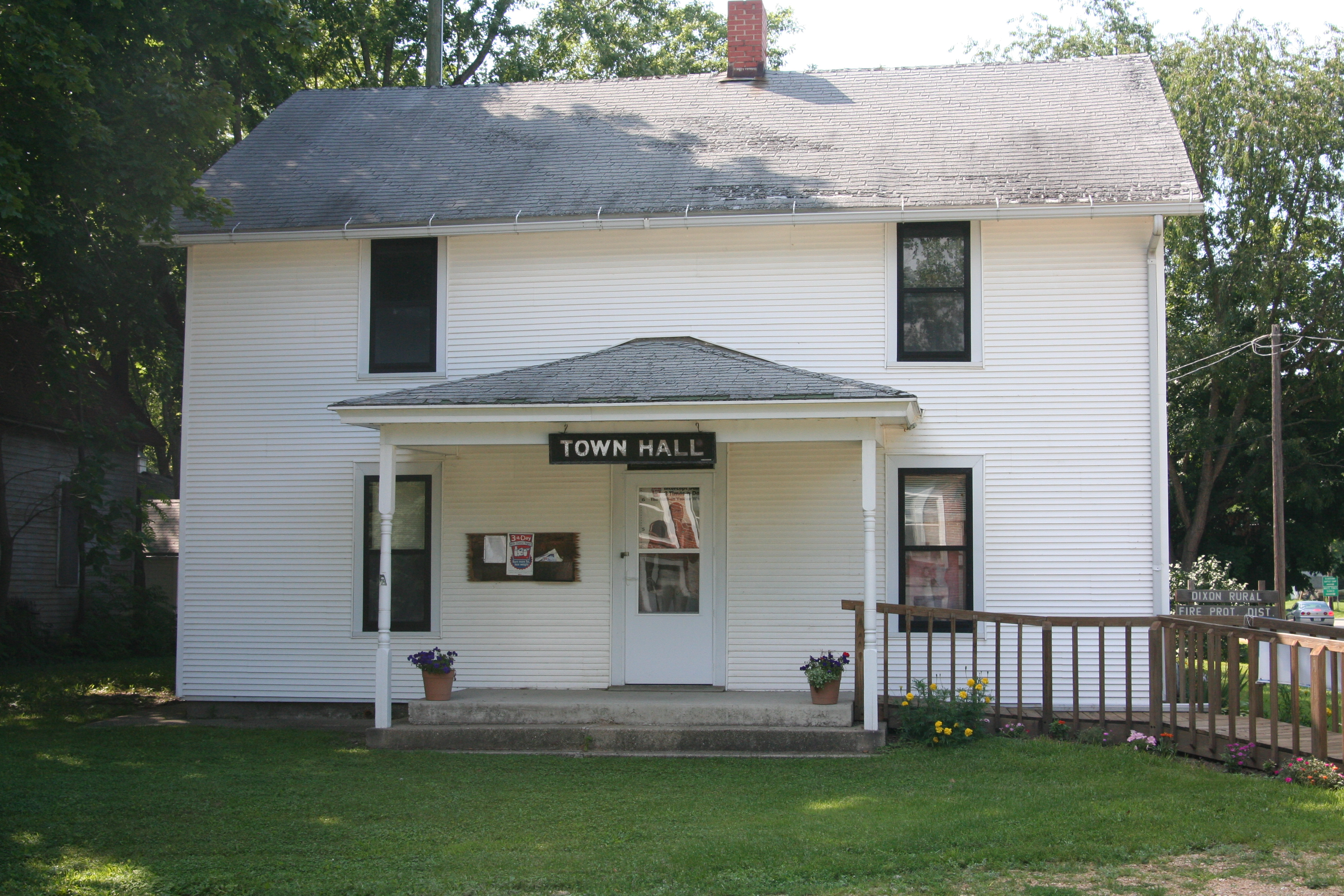
Grand Detour Town Hall

It is located in a multi-township assessment district with Pine Creek, Eagle Point, and Woosung townships. The township is coterminous with the township's sole voting precinct.
