= Stratford, Illinois =

- Unincorporated community
- Location within Illinois Location within the United States
- Coordinates: 41°59′49″N 89°29′27″W
- Country: United States
- State: Illinois
- County: Ogle
- Elevation: 827 ft (252 m)
- Time zone: UTC-6 (Central (CST))
  - Summer (DST): UTC-5 (CDT)
- Area codes: 815 & 779
- GNIS feature ID: 423210

Stratford is an unincorporated community in Ogle County, Illinois, United States.
