= Flagg Center, Illinois =

Flagg Center
- Unincorporated community
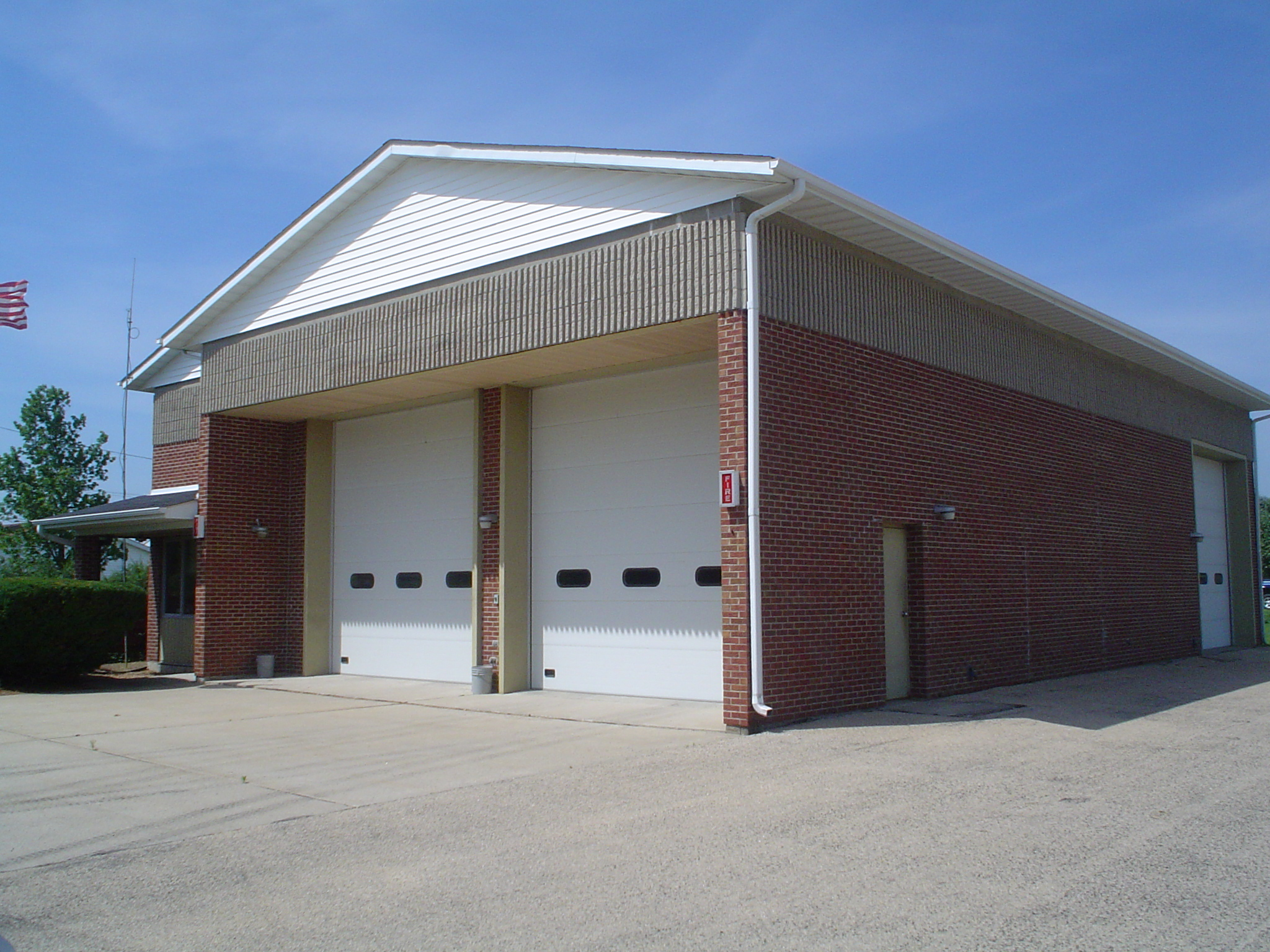
- Fire Department in Flagg Center

- Location of Flagg Center within Illinois Flagg Center (the United States)
- Coordinates: 41°56′26″N 89°07′20″W
- Country: United States
- State: Illinois
- County: Ogle
- Township: Flagg
- Elevation: 827 ft (252 m)
- Time zone: UTC-6 (CST)
  - Summer (DST): UTC-5 (CDT)
- Postal code: 61068
- Area codes: 815, 779
- GNIS feature ID: 425691

Flagg Center is an unincorporated community in the southeastern portion of Ogle County, Illinois, United States in Flagg Township. It may be found at the crossroads of Flagg and Center Roads, hence the name Flagg Center. There are two Churches located in Flagg Center...Full Gospel Fellowship Church and Iglesia Pentecostal Jesucristo Amor y Esperanza, AIC.
