= Hillcrest, Illinois =

- Village
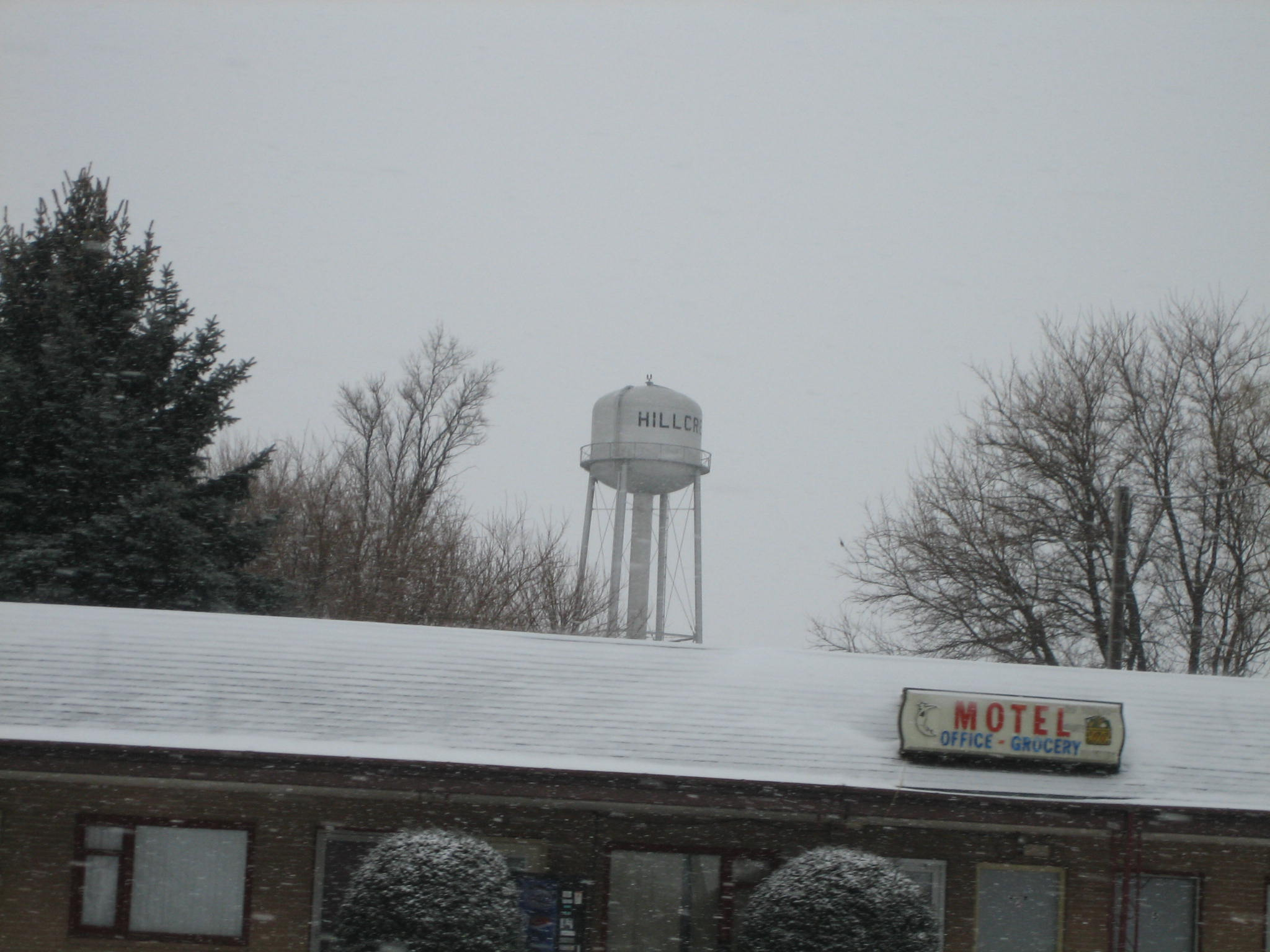
- The Hillcrest water tower looms over a small business in the foreground

- Location of Hillcrest in Ogle County, Illinois.

- Location within Ogle County Hillcrest, Illinois (Illinois)
- Coordinates: 41°57′11″N 89°04′06″W
- Country: United States
- State: Illinois
- County: Ogle
- Township: Flagg

Area
  - Total: 3.55 sq mi (9.19 km^{2})
  - Land: 3.55 sq mi (9.19 km^{2})
  - Water: 0 sq mi (0.00 km^{2})
- Elevation: 830 ft (250 m)

Population (2020)
  - Total: 1,224
  - Density: 344.9/sq mi (133.18/km^{2})
- Time zone: UTC-6 (CST)
  - Summer (DST): UTC-5 (CDT)
- Postal code: 61068
- Area code: 815
- FIPS code: 17-34982
- GNIS feature ID: 2398505
- Website: www.hillcrestil.us

Hillcrest is a village located in Ogle County, Illinois, United States. The 2020 census lists its population at 1,224, down from 1,236 in 2010.

== Geography ==
According to the 2010 census, Hillcrest has a total area of 3.16 square miles (8.18 km^{2}), all land.

== Demographics ==
Historical population
| Census | Pop. | Note | %± |
|---|---|---|---|
| 1960 | 224 | | — |
| 1970 | 630 | | 181.3% |
| 1980 | 818 | | 29.8% |
| 1990 | 828 | | 1.2% |
| 2000 | 1,158 | | 39.9% |
| 2010 | 1,326 | | 14.5% |
| 2020 | 1,224 | | −7.7% |
U.S. Decennial Census

=== 2020 census ===
As of the 2020 census, Hillcrest had a population of 1,224. The median age was 35.4 years. 26.5% of residents were under the age of 18 and 11.6% of residents were 65 years of age or older. For every 100 females there were 97.4 males, and for every 100 females age 18 and over there were 97.8 males age 18 and over.

97.4% of residents lived in urban areas, while 2.6% lived in rural areas.

There were 402 households in Hillcrest, of which 41.5% had children under the age of 18 living in them. Of all households, 59.5% were married-couple households, 10.7% were households with a male householder and no spouse or partner present, and 22.4% were households with a female householder and no spouse or partner present. About 15.4% of all households were made up of individuals and 4.9% had someone living alone who was 65 years of age or older.

There were 418 housing units, of which 3.8% were vacant. The homeowner vacancy rate was 2.0% and the rental vacancy rate was 4.8%.

Racial composition as of the 2020 census
| Race | Number | Percent |
|---|---|---|
| White | 838 | 68.5% |
| Black or African American | 17 | 1.4% |
| American Indian and Alaska Native | 16 | 1.3% |
| Asian | 5 | 0.4% |
| Native Hawaiian and Other Pacific Islander | 0 | 0.0% |
| Some other race | 168 | 13.7% |
| Two or more races | 180 | 14.7% |
| Hispanic or Latino (of any race) | 360 | 29.4% |

=== 2000 census ===
At the 2000 census, there were 1,158 people, 342 households and 297 families residing in the village. The population density was 2,080.8 inhabitants per square mile (803.4/km^{2}). There were 353 housing units at an average density of 634.3 per square mile (244.9/km^{2}). The racial makeup of the village was 88.51% White, 0.35% African American, 0.60% Native American, 0.26% Asian, 9.67% from other races, and 0.60% from two or more races. Hispanic or Latino of any race were 21.24% of the population.

There were 342 households, of which 52.3% had children under the age of 18 living with them, 73.7% were married couples living together, 7.9% had a female householder with no husband present, and 12.9% were non-families. 10.2% of all households were made up of individuals, and 1.5% had someone living alone who was 65 years of age or older. The average household size was 3.39 and the average family size was 3.61.

Age distribution was 36.4% under the age of 18, 7.8% from 18 to 24, 33.9% from 25 to 44, 16.6% from 45 to 64, and 5.4% who were 65 years of age or older. The median age was 30 years. For every 100 females, there were 107.5 males. For every 100 females age 18 and over, there were 98.1 males.

The median household income was $49,821, and the median family income was $49,375. Males had a median income of $36,250 versus $22,885 for females. The per capita income for the village was $15,340. About 5.3% of families and 6.1% of the population were below the poverty line, including 8.6% of those under age 18 and none of those age 65 or over.

== Education ==
Most of Hillcrest is within the Rochelle Community Consolidated District 231 while a section is in the Kings Consolidated School District 144. All of it is in the Rochelle Township High School District 212.
