= Lowden-Miller State Forest =

Forest in Ogle County, Illinois United States

Coordinates: 41°57′41″N 89°22′2″W

- IUCN category V (protected landscape/seascape)
- Location: Ogle County, Illinois, USA
- Nearest city: Oregon, Illinois
- Area: 2,291 acres (9.27 km^{2})
- Established: 1992
- Governing body: Illinois Department of Natural Resources

Lowden-Miller State Forest is a conservation area on 2,291 acres (927 ha) in Ogle County, Illinois, United States. The state acquired a 1,186-acre (480 ha) parcel of land for the forest in 1992, and the remainder of the land was acquired in 1993.
