= Coltonville, Illinois =

Community in Illinois, United States

Coltonville was a community in DeKalb County, Illinois, United States.

== History ==
In June 1839, DeKalb County was considering building a courthouse and, as such, placement of a county seat. Rufus Colton, Clerk of the Court in the county, was leading a push for Coltonville, where he lived. Through political wrangling, and underhanded techniques, Colton nearly led Coltonville into a new era as county seat. He had arranged for court to convene at his home, only after he had set up an election, as clerk, for county seat. The election was unique, in that, only the residents of Colton's choice for county seat, Coltonville, were informed of it. When the DeKalb County Court convened, in Colton's Coltonville home, the sheriff served a court order which stated a courthouse was to be built in Sycamore, the city which would become the county seat. Even without the court order, Colton's actions would have never been deemed legal; they were eventually cancelled by an act of the Illinois General Assembly. Along with Brush Point, the other community considered for county seat, both communities disappeared after losing out to Sycamore.

Today, the town name lives on as Coltonville Road in southwestern Sycamore. The townsite lies in DeKalb Township, near the cities of DeKalb and Sycamore. The old Coltonville School was located at 41°58′17″N 88°44′10″W.
