= Woosung, Illinois =

Woosung
- Unincorporated community
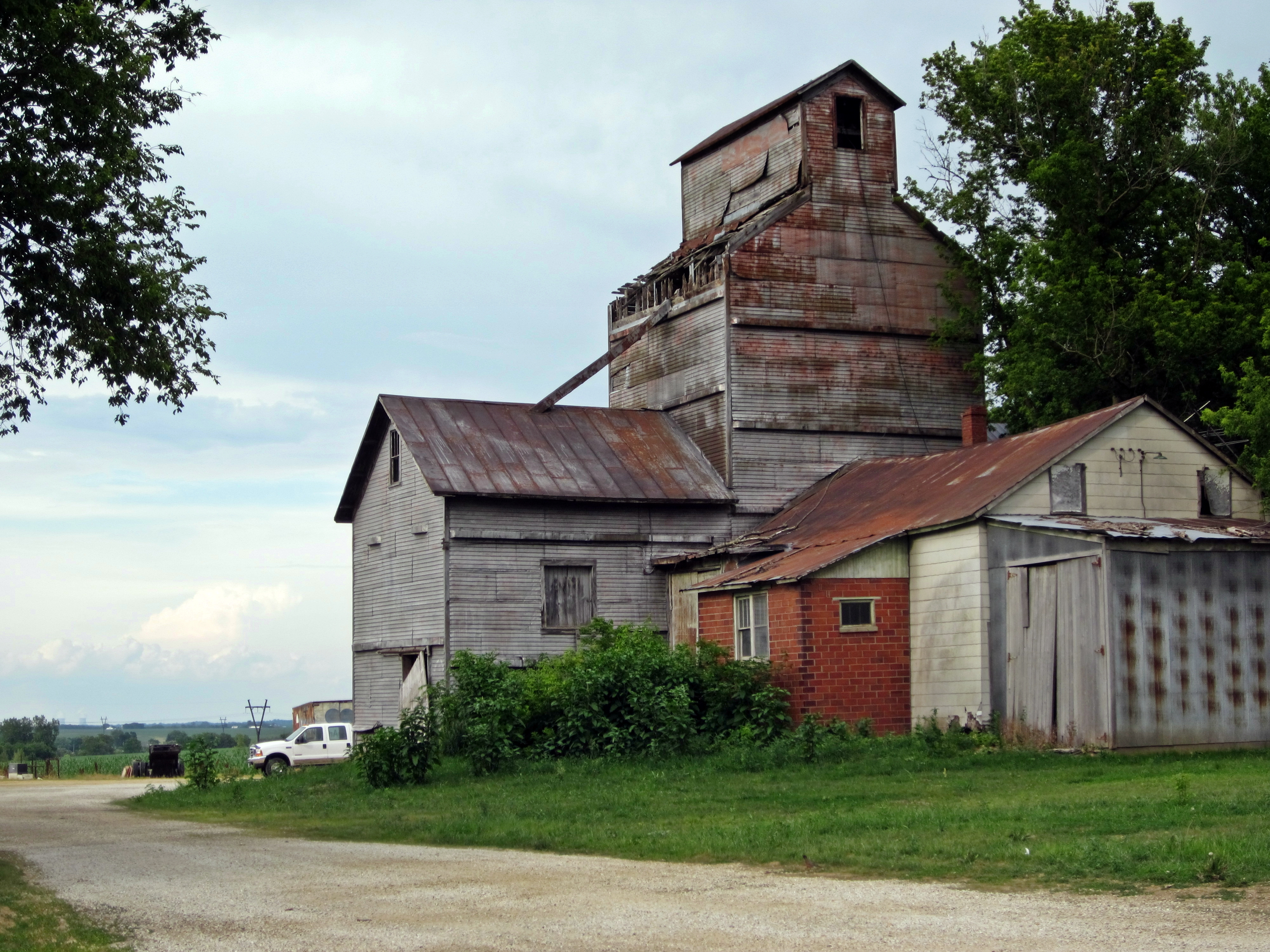
- Grain elevator in Woosung

- Location within Ogle County Woosung (Illinois)
- Coordinates: 41°54′12″N 89°32′27″W
- Country: United States
- State: Illinois
- County: Ogle
- Elevation: 827 ft (252 m)
- Time zone: UTC-6 (CST)
  - Summer (DST): UTC-5 (CDT)
- ZIP code: 61091
- Area code: 815
- GNIS feature ID: 421502

Woosung is an unincorporated community in Ogle County, Illinois, U.S., and is located in the far southwestern part of the county, northwest of Dixon.

Woosung was named by a railroad official who had once visited Woosung, China during his former career as a sea captain.
