= LaFayette Township, Ogle County, Illinois =

Coordinates: 41°54′30″N 89°13′37″W

LaFayette Township
- Township
- Location in the county of Ogle County.
- Country: United States
- State: Illinois
- County: Ogle

Government
  - Supervisor: Warren Seebach

Area
  - Total: 17.46 sq mi (45.2 km^{2})
  - Land: 17.46 sq mi (45.2 km^{2})
  - Water: 0 sq mi (0 km^{2}) 0%

Population (2010)
  - Total: 170
  - Density: 9.7/sq mi (3.7/km^{2})
- Time zone: UTC-6 (CST)
  - Summer (DST): UTC-5 (CDT)

LaFayette Township is located in Ogle County, Illinois. As of the 2010 census, its population was 170 and it contained 72 housing units. A referendum to merge LaFayette Township with neighboring Taylor Township failed when Taylor voted against the referendum. The referendum was approved in LaFayette.

== Geography ==
According to the 2010 census, the township has a total area of 17.46 square miles (45.2 km^{2}), all land.
