= Taylor Township, Illinois =

Taylor Township
- Township
- Location of Taylor Township in Ogle County

- Location of Illinois in the United States
- Coordinates: 41°54′35″N 89°20′09″W
- Country: United States
- State: Illinois
- County: Ogle
- Organized: November 6, 1849

Government
  - Mayor: Jo Ann Reynolds

Area
  - Total: 15.59 sq mi (40.4 km^{2})
  - Land: 15.24 sq mi (39.5 km^{2})
  - Water: 0.34 sq mi (0.88 km^{2})
- Elevation: 738 ft (225 m)

Population (2010)
  - Estimate (2016): 931
  - Density: 63.2/sq mi (24.4/km^{2})
- Time zone: UTC-6 (CST)
  - Summer (DST): UTC-5 (CDT)
- FIPS code: 17-141-74535

Taylor Township is located in Ogle County, Illinois. As of the 2010 census, its population was 963 and it contained 488 housing units. A referendum to merge Taylor Township with neighboring LaFayette Township failed when Taylor voted against the referendum. The referendum was approved in LaFayette.

== Geography ==
According to the 2010 census, the township has a total area of 15.59 square miles (40.4 km^{2}), of which 15.24 square miles (39.5 km^{2}) (or 97.75%) is land and 0.34 square miles (0.88 km^{2}) (or 2.18%) is water.

== Demographics ==
Historical population
Census	Pop.	Note	%±
2016 (est.)	931
U.S. Decennial Census
