= Egan, Illinois =

Egan
- Unincorporated community
- Location within Ogle County Egan (Illinois)
- Coordinates: 42°11′18″N 89°24′21″W
- Country: United States
- State: Illinois
- County: Ogle
- Township: Leaf River
- Elevation: 820 ft (250 m)
- Time zone: UTC-6 (CST)
  - Summer (DST): UTC-5 (CDT)
- ZIP Code: 61026
- Area code: 815
- GNIS feature ID: 407811

Egan is an unincorporated community in Ogle County, Illinois, United States, located north of Leaf River.
