= Chana, Illinois =

Chana
- Unincorporated community
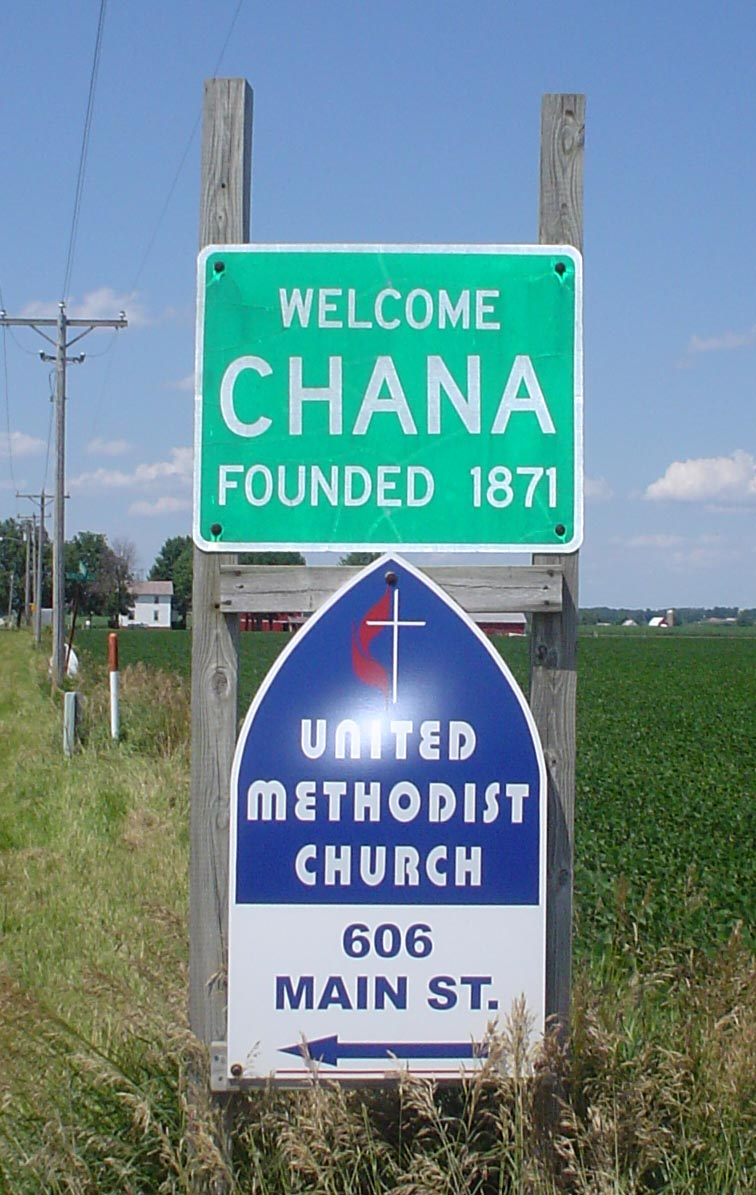
- Sign into Chana

- Location within Ogle County Chana (Illinois)
- Coordinates: 41°58′50″N 89°13′11″W
- Country: United States
- State: Illinois
- County: Ogle
- Township: Pine Rock
- Elevation: 778 ft (237 m)
- Time zone: UTC-6 (CST)
  - Summer (DST): UTC-5 (CDT)
- ZIP code: 61015
- Area code: 815
- GNIS feature ID: 405944

Chana is an unincorporated community in Ogle County, Illinois, United States, and is located southeast of Oregon.

== Notable person ==
- Robert R. Canfield (1909–1994), lawyer and politician, was born in Chana.

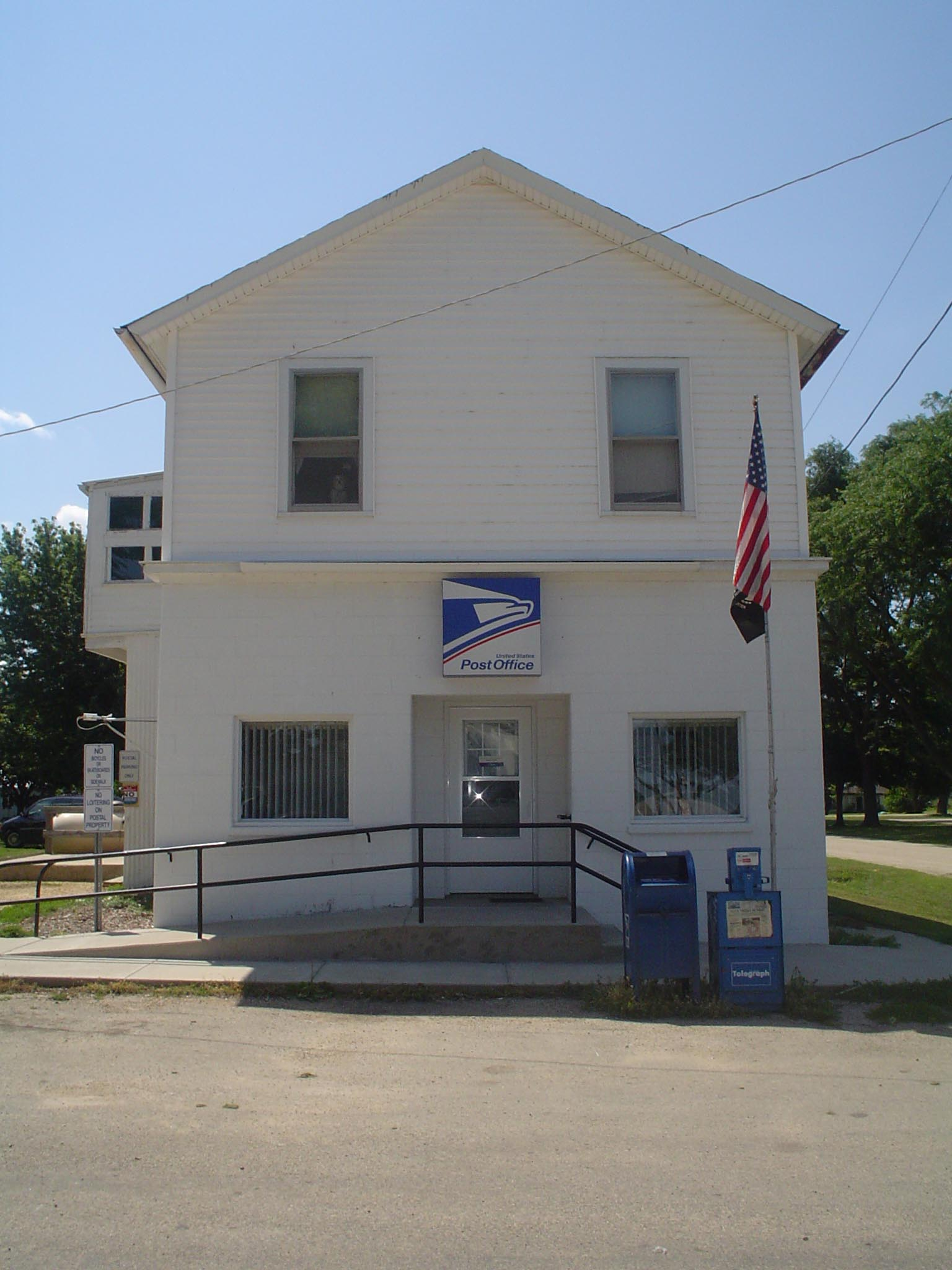
Post office in Chana

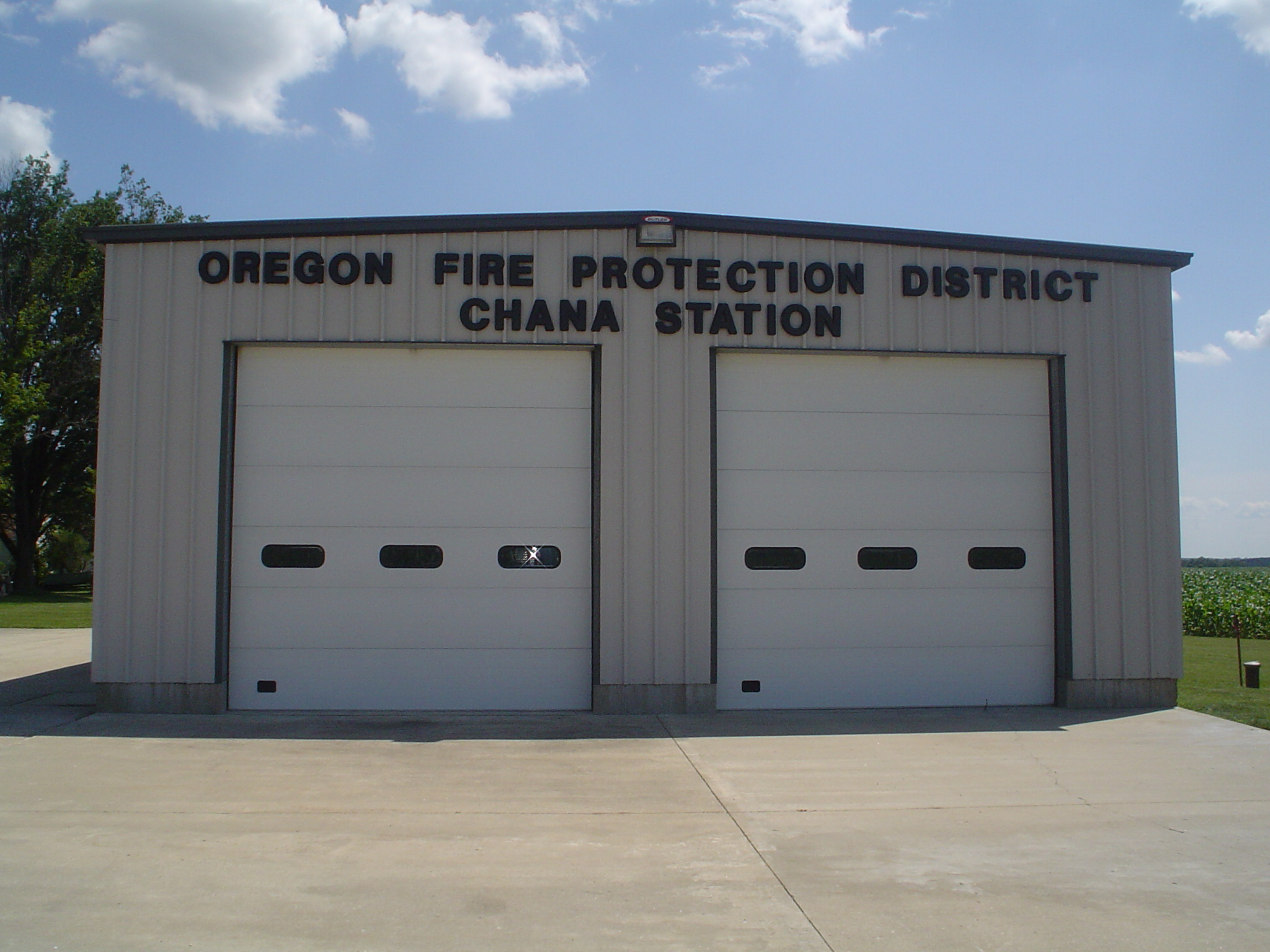
Oregon Fire station in Chana
