= Area codes 815 and 779 =

Telephone area codes

Coordinates: 40.195659°N 89.516602°W

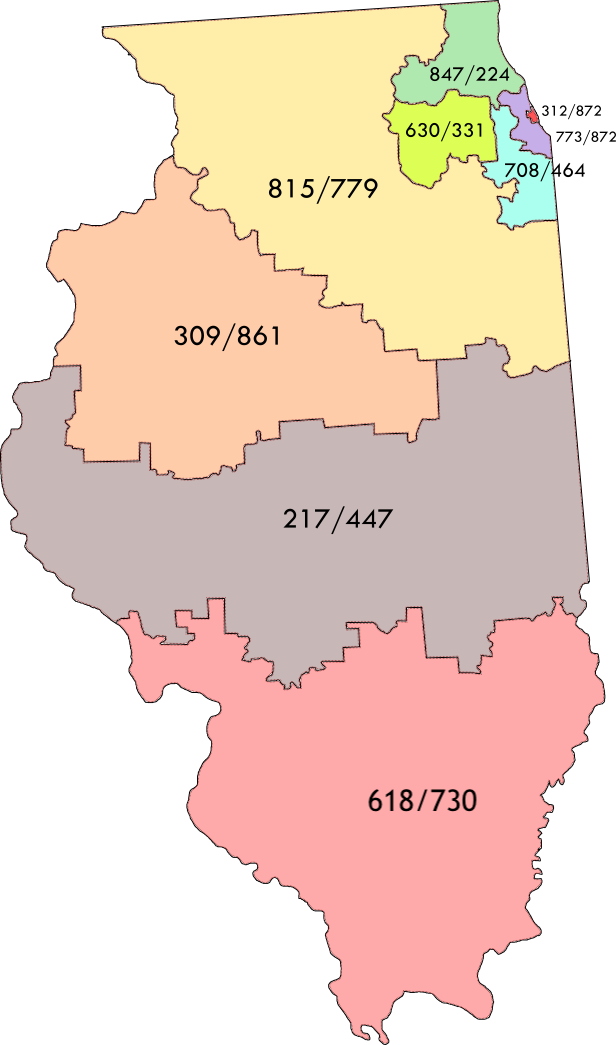
All NPAs within Illinois

Area codes 815 and 779 are telephone area codes in the North American Numbering Plan (NANP) for most of northern Illinois outside the Quad Cities areas. It also serves the Joliet area and some of Chicago’s western and northwestern suburbs. 815 was one of the four original Illinois area codes assigned in 1947. Area code 779 was added to the same numbering plan area (NPA) in 2009 to form an overlay complex.

== History ==
When the American Telephone and Telegraph Company (AT&T) created the first nationwide telephone numbering plan for Operator Toll Dialing in 1947, the state of Illinois was divided into four numbering plan areas (NPAs). They were generally laid out as a region in and around Chicago, a northern band outside Chicago, and two bands in the central and southern parts of the state. 815 was assigned to the northern band outside Chicago as one of the 86 original North American area codes.

After September 1956, the 815 numbering plan area was divided roughly in half along a north-westerly to south-easterly running line. Area code 309 was created by merging the western part of 815, including the Illinois side of the Quad Cities, with the northern portion of area code 217. The new area code was one of the first area codes not serving an entire state, but having the digit 0 in the middle position of the code. It was the only new area code created in Illinois between 1947 and the 1989 creation of area code 708.

In preparation of an overlay complex with the new area code 779, all calls from the 815 area needed to be dialed with an area code beginning on February 17, 2007. A month later, area code 779 was activated.

== Service area ==
- Adeline
- Amboy
- Andres
- Apple River
- Argyle
- Aroma Park
- Ashkum
- Ashton
- Baileyville
- Belvidere
- Bonfield
- Bourbonnais
- Braceville
- Bradley
- Braidwood
- Brush Point
- Buckingham
- Buffalo Grove
- Bull Valley
- Byron
- Caledonia
- Capron
- Carbon Hill
- Cedar Point
- Cedarville
- Chadwick
- Chana
- Channahon
- Cherry Valley
- Clifton
- Coal City
- Coleta
- Coltonville
- Compton
- Coral
- Cortland
- Crest Hill
- Creston
- Crystal Lake
- Crystal Lawns
- Dakota
- Dana
- Danforth
- Davis
- Davis Junction
- Daysville
- Deer Grove
- DeKalb
- Diamond
- Dixon
- Durand
- Dwight
- Earlville
- East Brooklyn
- East Dubuque
- Egan
- Eleroy
- Elizabeth
- Elwood
- Esmond
- Essex
- Fairdale
- Fairmont
- Flagg Center
- Forreston
- Frankfort
- Frankfort Square
- Franklin Grove
- Freeport
- Fulton
- Galena
- Genoa
- Garden Prairie
- Gardner
- German Valley
- Gilman
- Godley
- Grand Detour
- Grand Ridge
- Grant Park
- Granville
- Greenwood
- Haldane
- Hanover
- Harmon
- Harrison
- Harvard
- Hebron
- Herscher
- Holiday Hills
- Homer Glen
- Hillcrest
- Hinckley
- Hopkins Park
- Ingalls Park
- Irwin
- Johnsburg
- Joliet
- Kangley
- Kankakee
- Kent
- Kings
- Kingston
- Kinsman
- Kirkland
- Lake Holiday
- Lake Summerset
- Lakemoor
- Lakewood
- Lakewood Shores
- Lanark
- LaSalle
- Leaf River
- Lee
- Leland
- Lena
- Leonore
- Lindenwood
- Lisbon
- Lockport
- Lostant
- Loves Park
- Lyndon
- Machesney Park
- Malta
- Manhattan
- Manteno
- Maple Park
- Marengo
- Marseilles
- Mazon
- McCullom Lake
- McHenry
- Mendota
- Menominee
- Meriden
- Millbrook
- Milledgeville
- Millington
- Minooka
- Mokena
- Momence
- Monee
- Monroe Center
- Morris
- Morrison
- Mount Carroll
- Mount Morris
- Naplate
- Nelson
- New Milford
- New Lenox
- Newark
- Nora
- North Utica
- Norway
- Odell
- Oglesby
- Onarga
- Oneco
- Orangeville
- Oregon
- Ottawa
- Paw Paw
- Paynes Point
- Pearl City
- Pecatonica
- Peotone
- Peru
- Plainfield
- Polo
- Pontiac
- Poplar Grove
- Prairie Grove
- Preston Heights
- Princeton
- Prophetstown
- Ransom
- Reddick
- Richmond
- Ridott
- Ringwood
- Ritchie
- Rochelle
- Rock City
- Rock Falls
- Rockdale
- Rockford
- Rockton
- Rodden
- Romeoville
- Roscoe
- Rutland
- St. Anne
- Sandwich
- Savanna
- Scales Mound
- Seneca
- Serena
- Seward
- Shabbona
- Shannon
- Sheridan
- Shirland
- Shorewood
- Somonauk
- South Beloit
- South Wilmington
- Spring Grove
- Spring Valley
- Sterling
- Steward
- Stillman Valley
- Stockton
- Streator
- Sublette
- Sun River Terrace
- Sycamore
- Symerton
- Tampico
- Thomson
- Timberlane
- Toluca
- Tonica
- Triumph
- Troy Grove
- Union
- Union Hill
- Verona
- Waddams Grove
- Walnut
- Warren
- Waterman
- Watseka
- West Brooklyn
- Wenona
- Wilmington
- Wilton
- Wilton Center
- Winnebago
- Winslow
- Wonder Lake
- Wonder Lake (CDP)
- Woodstock
- Woosung

== See also ==
- List of North American Numbering Plan area codes
- List of Illinois area codes

Illinois area codes: 217/447, 309/861, 312, 630/331, 618/730, 708/464, 773, 815/779, 847/224, 872
| | North: 608/353, 262 | |
| West: 563 | 779/815 | East: 847/224, 630/331, 708/464 |
| | South: 309/861, 217/447 | |
Wisconsin area codes: 262, 414, 608/353, 715/534, 920/274
Indiana area codes: 219, 260, 317/463, 574, 765, 812/930
Iowa area codes: 319, 515, 563, 641, 712
