= Lynnville Township, Illinois =

Lynnville Township
- Township
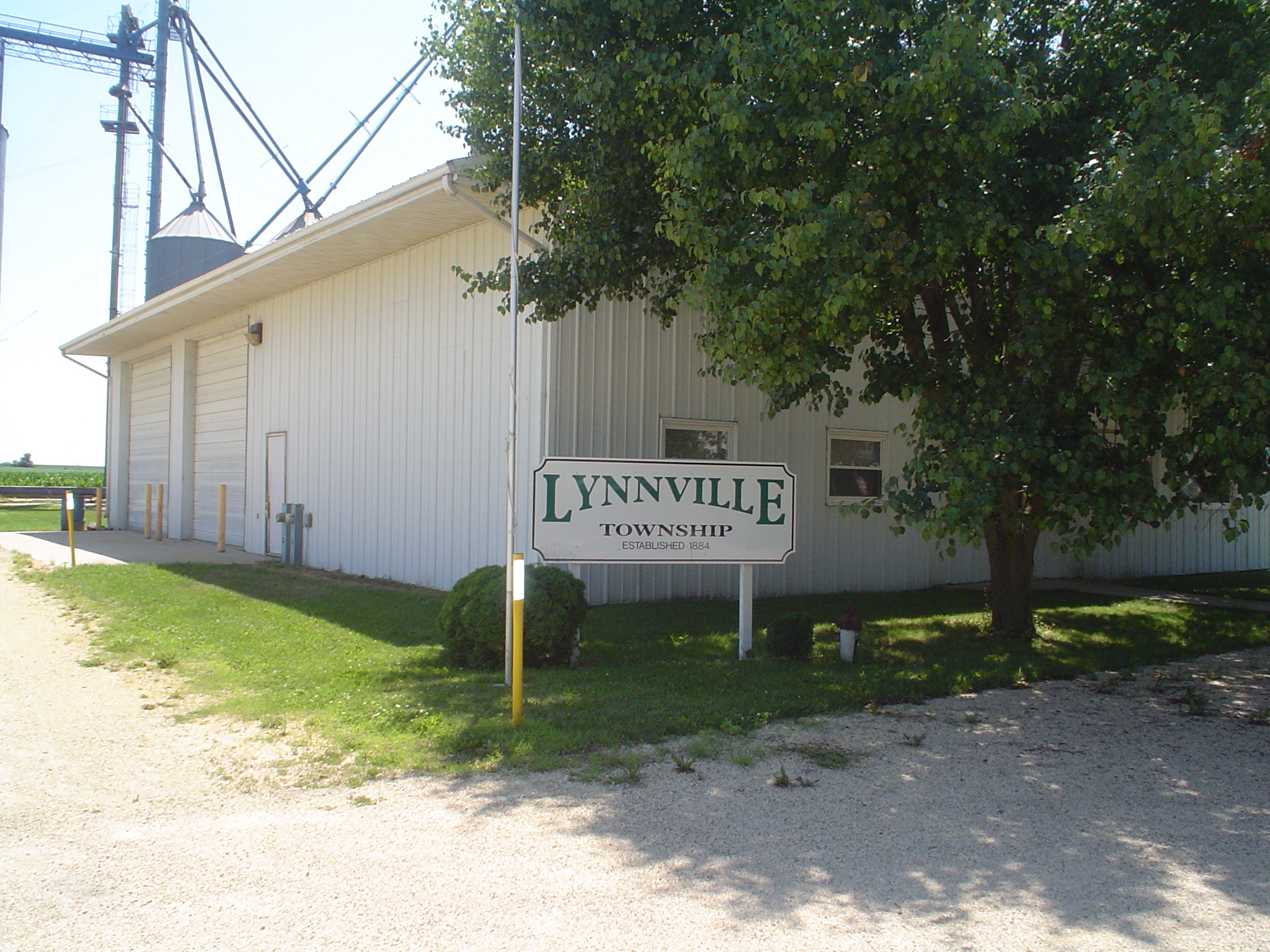
- Lynnville Township building located in Lindenwood.

- Location of Illinois in the United States
- Coordinates: 42°01′15″N 89°00′08″W
- Country: United States
- State: Illinois
- County: Ogle
- Organized: November 6, 1849

Government
  - Mayor: Marilyn Schlaf

Area
  - Total: 34.92 sq mi (90.4 km^{2})
  - Land: 34.9 sq mi (90 km^{2})
  - Water: 0.02 sq mi (0.052 km^{2})
- Elevation: 771 ft (235 m)

Population (2010)
  - Estimate (2016): 618
  - Density: 18.4/sq mi (7.1/km^{2})
- Time zone: UTC-6 (CST)
  - Summer (DST): UTC-5 (CDT)
- FIPS code: 17-141-45382

Lynnville Township is located in Ogle County, Illinois. As of the 2010 census, its population was 642 and it contained 247 housing units.

== Geography ==
According to the 2010 census, the township has a total area of 34.92 square miles (90.4 km^{2}), of which 34.9 square miles (90 km^{2}) (or 99.94%) is land and 0.02 square miles (0.052 km^{2}) (or 0.06%) is water.

== Demographics ==
Historical population
Census	Pop.	Note	%±
2016 (est.)	618
U.S. Decennial Census
