= Maryland Township, Illinois =

Coordinates: 42°08′42″N 89°29′35″W

Maryland Township
- Township
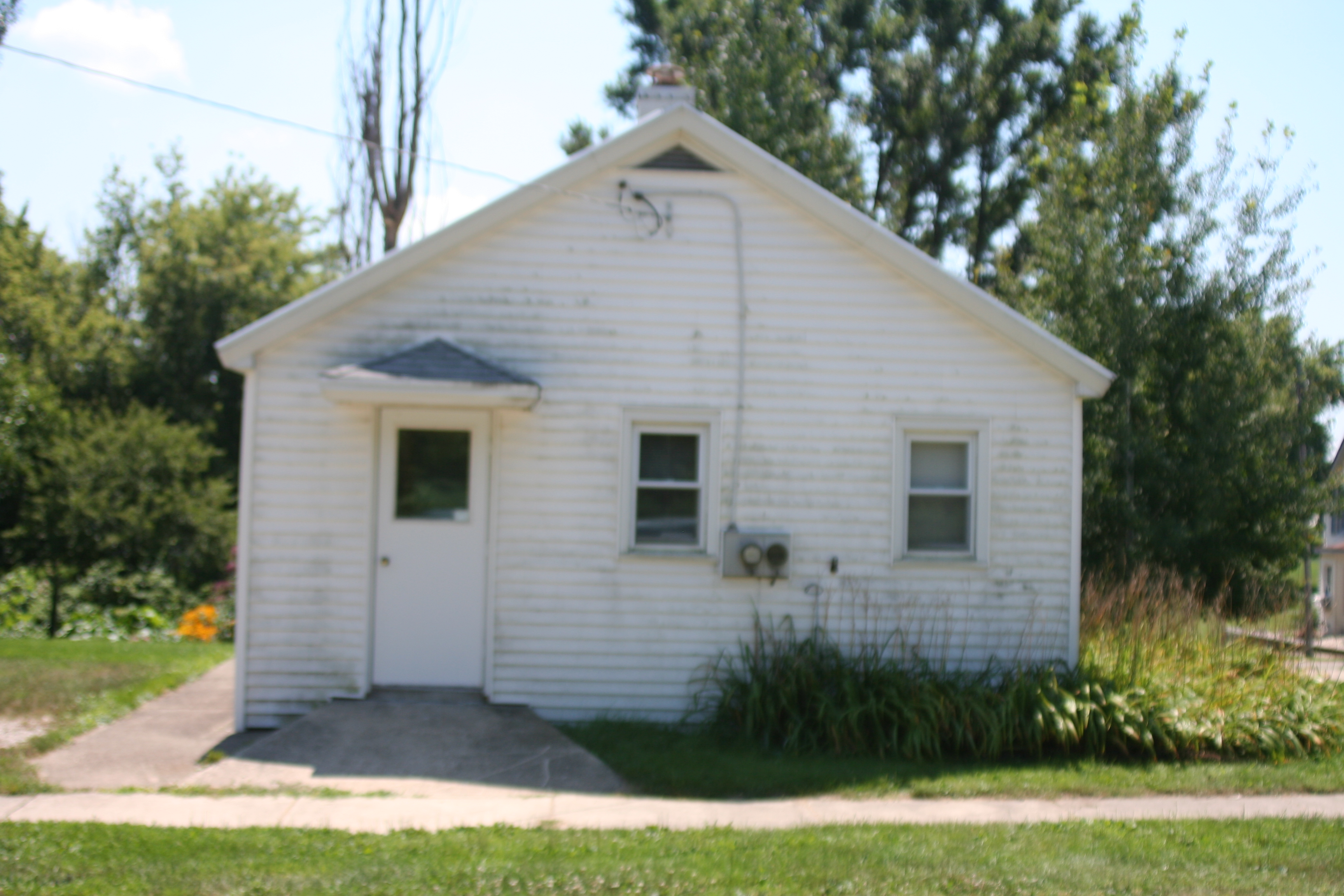
- Town hall in Adeline

- Location in Ogle County.
- Country: United States
- State: Illinois
- County: Ogle

Government
  - Supervisor: Fred Wiederholtz

Area
  - Total: 36.04 sq mi (93.3 km^{2})
  - Land: 36.02 sq mi (93.3 km^{2})
  - Water: 0.02 sq mi (0.052 km^{2}) 0.06%

Population (2010)
  - Estimate (2016): 512
  - Density: 14.9/sq mi (5.8/km^{2})
- Time zone: UTC-6 (CST)
  - Summer (DST): UTC-5 (CDT)
- FIPS code: 17-141-47358

Maryland Township is located in Ogle County, Illinois. As of the 2010 census, its population was 535 and it contained 251 housing units.

== History ==
"Whereas, It appears from a communication from the Auditor of State to the Clerk of the County Court that, by a decision in his office, the names of the Towns [sic Townships] of Harrison, Eagle and Brooklyn must be changed, in pursuance of which the name of the Town is changed to the name of Maryland; the name of the Town of Brooklyn is changed to Rockvale, and the name of the Town of Eagle is changed to the name of Pine Rock." [Nov. 12, 1850]

== Geography ==
According to the 2010 census, the township has a total area of 36.04 square miles (93.3 km^{2}), of which 36.02 square miles (93.3 km^{2}) (or 99.94%) is land and 0.02 square miles (0.052 km^{2}) (or 0.06%) is water.

== Demographics ==
Historical population
Census	Pop.	Note	%±
2016 (est.)	512
U.S. Decennial Census
