= Oregon–Nashua Township, Illinois =

Coordinates: 42°00′13″N 89°20′07″W

Oregon-Nashua Township
- Township
- Location in Ogle County.
- Country: United States
- State: Illinois
- County: Ogle

Government
  - Supervisor: Sharon Bowers

Area
  - Total: 39.67 sq mi (102.7 km^{2})
  - Land: 38.44 sq mi (99.6 km^{2})
  - Water: 1.23 sq mi (3.2 km^{2}) 3.10%

Population (2010)
  - Estimate (2016): 4,686
  - Density: 127.7/sq mi (49.3/km^{2})
- Time zone: UTC-6 (CST)
  - Summer (DST): UTC-5 (CDT)
- FIPS code: 17-141-56504
- Website: oregon-nashuatownship.org

Oregon-Nashua Township is located in Ogle County, Illinois. As of the 2010 census, its population was 4,909 and it contained 2,382 housing units.

== History ==
Prior to the year 1993, Oregon and Nashua were separate townships, but merged in that year.

== Geography ==
According to the 2010 census, the township has a total area of 39.67 square miles (102.7 km^{2}), of which 38.44 square miles (99.6 km^{2}) (or 96.90%) is land and 1.23 square miles (3.2 km^{2}) (or 3.10%) is water.

== Demographics ==
Historical population
Census	Pop.	Note	%±
2016 (est.)	4,686
U.S. Decennial Census
