= Ogle County, Illinois =

County in Illinois, United States

- County
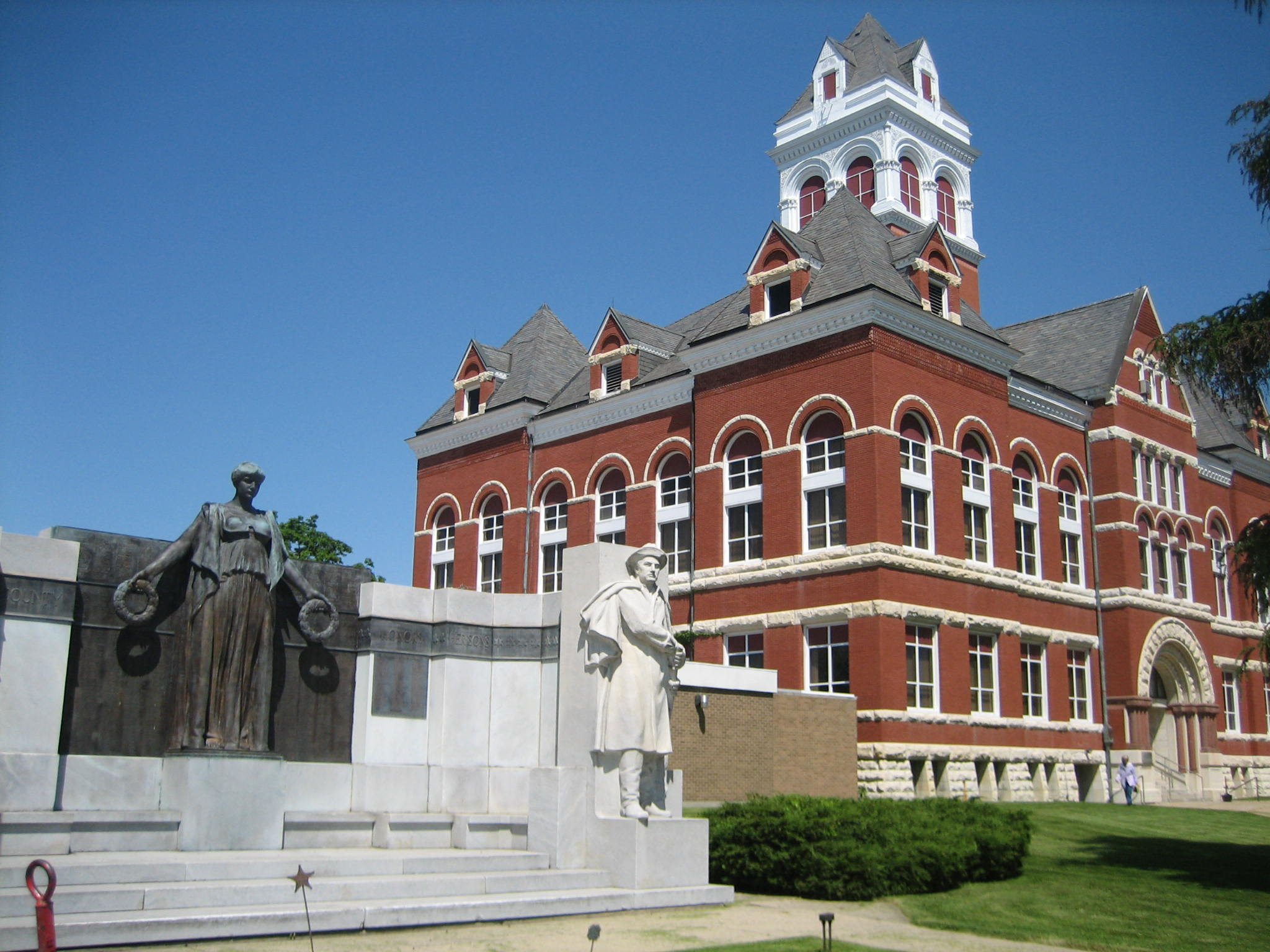
- Ogle County Courthouse

- Location within the U.S. state of Illinois
- Coordinates: 42°02′N 89°19′W
- Country: United States
- State: Illinois
- Founded: January 16, 1836
- Named for: Joseph Ogle
- Seat: Oregon
- Largest city: Rochelle

Area
  - Total: 763 sq mi (1,980 km^{2})
  - Land: 759 sq mi (1,970 km^{2})
  - Water: 4.4 sq mi (11 km^{2}) 0.6%

Population (2020)
  - Total: 51,788
  - Estimate (2025): 51,399 ▼
  - Density: 68.2/sq mi (26.3/km^{2})
- Time zone: UTC−6 (Central)
  - Summer (DST): UTC−5 (CDT)
- Congressional district: 16th
- Website: www.oglecountyil.gov

Ogle County is a county in the northern part of the U.S. state of Illinois. According to the 2020 United States census, it had a population of 51,788. Its county seat is Oregon, and its largest city is Rochelle. Ogle County comprises Rochelle, IL Micropolitan Statistical Area, which is also included in the Rockford-Freeport-Rochelle, IL Combined Statistical Area.

== History ==
Ogle County was formed in 1836 out of Jo Daviess and LaSalle counties, and named in honor of Captain Joseph Ogle, a veteran of the Revolutionary War who settled in Illinois in 1785. Ogle County government was organized in 1837; before that time it remained assigned to Jo Daviess County for legislative, taxation, and judicial matters. In 1839, part of Ogle County was partitioned off to form Lee County.

Ogle County was a New England settlement. The founders of Oregon and Rochelle arrived from New England; they were "Yankees", descendants of English Puritans who had settled New England in the 1600s. They were part of a wave of farmers who migrated into the Northwest Territory in the early 1800s, their trek eased by completion of the Erie Canal in 1825. They found virgin forest and wild prairie, and quickly laid out farms, constructed roads, erected government buildings and established post routes. They brought a passion for education and strong abolitionism. They were members of the Congregationalist or Episcopalian Church. Culturally Ogle County, like much of northern Illinois would maintain values similar to those of New England.

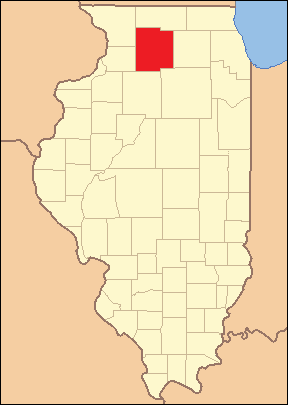
Ogle County between 1836 and 1839

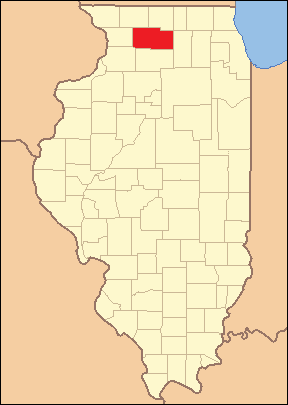
Ogle County after 1839, when Lee County was formed

== Geography ==
According to the US Census Bureau, the county has a total area of 763 square miles (1,980 km^{2}), of which 759 square miles (1,970 km^{2}) is land and 4.4 square miles (11 km^{2}) (0.6%) is water.

=== Adjacent counties ===
- Winnebago County - north
- Boone County - northeast
- Stephenson County - northwest
- DeKalb County - east
- Carroll County - west
- Lee County - south
- Whiteside County - southwest

=== Climate ===
Oregon, Illinois

Climate chart (precipitation, max. and min. temperature)
J	F	M	A	M	J	J	A	S	O	N	D
1.6 26 10	1.4 32 15	2.6 44 27	3.6 58 37	4.3 70 48	4.9 79 58	3.5 82 62	4.5 80 60	3.3 73 51	2.7 62 39	2.8 45 28	2.1 31 17
- █ Average max. and min. temperatures in °F
- █ Precipitation totals in inches
- Source: The Weather Channel
Metric conversion
J	F	M	A	M	J	J	A	S	O	N	D
41 −3 −12	36 0 −9	65 7 −3	92 14 3	110 21 9	124 26 14	88 28 17	114 27 16	84 23 11	69 17 4	72 7 −2	54 −1 −8
- █ Average max. and min. temperatures in °C
- █ Precipitation totals in mm

In recent years, average temperatures in Oregon have ranged from a low of 10 °F (−12 °C) in January to a high of 82 °F (28 °C) in July, although a record low of −27 °F (−33 °C) was recorded in January 1999 and a record high of 110 °F (43 °C) was recorded in July 1936. Average monthly precipitation ranged from 1.43 inches (36 mm) in February to 4.88 inches (124 mm) in June.

== Demographics ==
Historical population
Census	Pop.	Note	%±
1840	3,479		—
1850	10,020		188.0%
1860	22,888		128.4%
1870	27,492		20.1%
1880	29,937		8.9%
1890	28,710		−4.1%
1900	29,129		1.5%
1910	27,864		−4.3%
1920	26,830		−3.7%
1930	28,118		4.8%
1940	29,869		6.2%
1950	33,429		11.9%
1960	38,106		14.0%
1970	42,867		12.5%
1980	46,338		8.1%
1990	45,957		−0.8%
2000	51,032		11.0%
2010	53,497		4.8%
2020	51,788		−3.2%
2025 (est.)	51,399	▼	−0.8%
US Decennial Census; 1790-1960 1900-1990; 1990-2000 2010

=== 2020 census ===
As of the 2020 census, the county had a population of 51,788. The median age was 41.9 years; 22.8% of residents were under the age of 18 and 19.0% of residents were 65 years of age or older. For every 100 females there were 97.9 males, and for every 100 females age 18 and over there were 96.8 males age 18 and over.

The racial makeup of the county was 86.0% White, 1.1% Black or African American, 0.5% American Indian and Alaska Native, 0.5% Asian, <0.1% Native Hawaiian and Pacific Islander, 4.6% from some other race, and 7.3% from two or more races. Hispanic or Latino residents of any race comprised 11.2% of the population.

32.1% of residents lived in urban areas, while 67.9% lived in rural areas.

There were 20,870 households in the county, of which 29.6% had children under the age of 18 living in them. Of all households, 51.7% were married-couple households, 17.8% were households with a male householder and no spouse or partner present, and 22.5% were households with a female householder and no spouse or partner present. About 27.1% of all households were made up of individuals and 12.4% had someone living alone who was 65 years of age or older.

There were 22,632 housing units, of which 7.8% were vacant. Among occupied housing units, 74.4% were owner-occupied and 25.6% were renter-occupied. The homeowner vacancy rate was 1.9% and the rental vacancy rate was 7.0%.

=== Racial and ethnic composition ===
Ogle County, Illinois – Racial and ethnic composition Note: the US Census treats Hispanic/Latino as an ethnic category. This table excludes Latinos from the racial categories and assigns them to a separate category. Hispanics/Latinos may be of any race.
Race / Ethnicity (NH = Non-Hispanic)	Pop 1980	Pop 1990	Pop 2000	Pop 2010	Pop 2020	% 1980	% 1990	% 2000	% 2010	% 2020
White alone (NH)	44,968	44,275	7,090	7,163	6,157	97.04%	96.34%	98.62%	94.95%	89.21%
Black or African American alone (NH)	59	66	16	240	283	0.13%	0.14%	0.22%	3.18%	4.10%
Native American or Alaska Native alone (NH)	69	86	11	12	28	0.15%	0.19%	0.15%	0.16%	0.41%
Asian alone (NH)	101	124	5	9	25	0.22%	0.27%	0.07%	0.12%	0.36%
Native Hawaiian or Pacific Islander alone (NH)	x	x	1	0	2	x	x	0.01%	0.00%	0.03%
Other race alone (NH)	88	27	1	2	17	0.19%	0.06%	0.01%	0.03%	0.25%
Mixed race or Multiracial (NH)	x	x	26	28	238	x	x	0.36%	0.37%	3.45%
Hispanic or Latino (any race)	1,053	1,379	39	90	152	2.27%	3.00%	0.54%	1.19%	2.20%
Total	46,338	45,957	7,189	7,544	6,902	100.00%	100.00%	100.00%	100.00%	100.00%

=== 2010 census ===
As of the 2010 United States census, there were 53,497 people, 20,856 households, and 14,711 families residing in the county. The population density was 70.5 inhabitants per square mile (27.2/km^{2}). There were 22,561 housing units at an average density of 29.7 per square mile (11.5/km^{2}). The racial makeup of the county was 93.2% white, 0.9% black or African American, 0.5% Asian, 0.2% American Indian, 3.8% from other races, and 1.4% from two or more races. Those of Hispanic or Latino origin made up 8.9% of the population. In terms of ancestry, 38.0% were German, 15.3% were Irish, 10.2% were English, 6.4% were American, 5.3% were Swedish, and 5.3% were Norwegian.

Of the 20,856 households, 33.1% had children under the age of 18 living with them, 56.1% were married couples living together, 9.7% had a female householder with no husband present, 29.5% were non-families, and 24.5% of all households were made up of individuals. The average household size was 2.54 and the average family size was 3.01. The median age was 40.7 years.

The median income for a household in the county was $55,733 and the median income for a family was $64,927. Males had a median income of $49,996 versus $32,082 for females. The per capita income for the county was $24,959. About 6.6% of families and 8.9% of the population were below the poverty line, including 12.4% of those under age 18 and 5.9% of those age 65 or over.

== Economy ==
By 2000, 65% of the county labor force was employed as white-collar workers with an increase of 20 points in comparison with 1990 statistics. Manufacturing remains the leading employment sector absorbing more than 21.7% of the labor force though there was a decrease from 30,4% in 1995. However it is expected that services would replace manufacturing starting 2015 as the leading activity.

Agriculture remains important in Ogle county, mainly corn and soybeans. In 2003, the Illinois Department of Agriculture ranked Ogle County 17th in the State for crop cash receipts, and 14th in the state for livestock cash receipts. As for livestock production, hogs and pigs are still leading even though productions decreased from 57,000 units in 1998 to 48,900 in 2002.

The county also got some investment packages such as a $180 million truck-to-train cargo hub in 2006. In August 2006, it was announced that a new ethanol production facility would receive a package of $5.5 million Opportunity Returns grant from the State.

== Politics ==
United States presidential election results for Ogle County, Illinois
Year	Republican		Democratic		Third party(ies)	
Year	No.	%	No.	%	No.	%
1892	3,939	60.61%	2,244	34.53%	316	4.86%
1896	5,210	69.20%	2,142	28.45%	177	2.35%
1900	5,255	68.97%	2,171	28.49%	193	2.53%
1904	5,109	75.14%	1,209	17.78%	481	7.07%
1908	4,848	69.24%	1,761	25.15%	393	5.61%
1912	2,014	29.86%	1,750	25.95%	2,981	44.20%
1916	8,639	70.30%	3,207	26.10%	442	3.60%
1920	9,322	82.99%	1,720	15.31%	191	1.70%
1924	8,449	71.61%	1,591	13.48%	1,759	14.91%
1928	9,808	78.18%	2,691	21.45%	47	0.37%
1932	8,224	59.11%	5,416	38.93%	272	1.96%
1936	9,576	61.60%	5,776	37.15%	194	1.25%
1940	11,838	70.71%	4,833	28.87%	71	0.42%
1944	10,680	72.59%	3,951	26.86%	81	0.55%
1948	9,519	71.15%	3,796	28.37%	63	0.47%
1952	13,351	77.79%	3,796	22.12%	16	0.09%
1956	13,194	78.21%	3,660	21.70%	16	0.09%
1960	13,226	73.38%	4,792	26.59%	7	0.04%
1964	10,430	60.13%	6,917	39.87%	0	0.00%
1968	12,168	68.98%	4,399	24.94%	1,074	6.09%
1972	13,512	73.88%	4,743	25.93%	35	0.19%
1976	11,073	62.22%	6,463	36.32%	261	1.47%
1980	12,533	66.41%	4,067	21.55%	2,271	12.03%
1984	13,503	73.40%	4,803	26.11%	90	0.49%
1988	11,644	66.94%	5,641	32.43%	109	0.63%
1992	9,008	44.80%	6,512	32.38%	4,589	22.82%
1996	9,558	52.13%	6,765	36.90%	2,012	10.97%
2000	12,325	59.83%	7,673	37.25%	603	2.93%
2004	14,918	61.92%	9,018	37.43%	155	0.64%
2008	13,144	52.72%	11,253	45.13%	537	2.15%
2012	13,422	57.44%	9,514	40.72%	431	1.84%
2016	14,352	59.32%	8,050	33.27%	1,791	7.40%
2020	16,248	61.69%	9,428	35.79%	664	2.52%
2024	16,450	63.51%	8,883	34.30%	567	2.19%

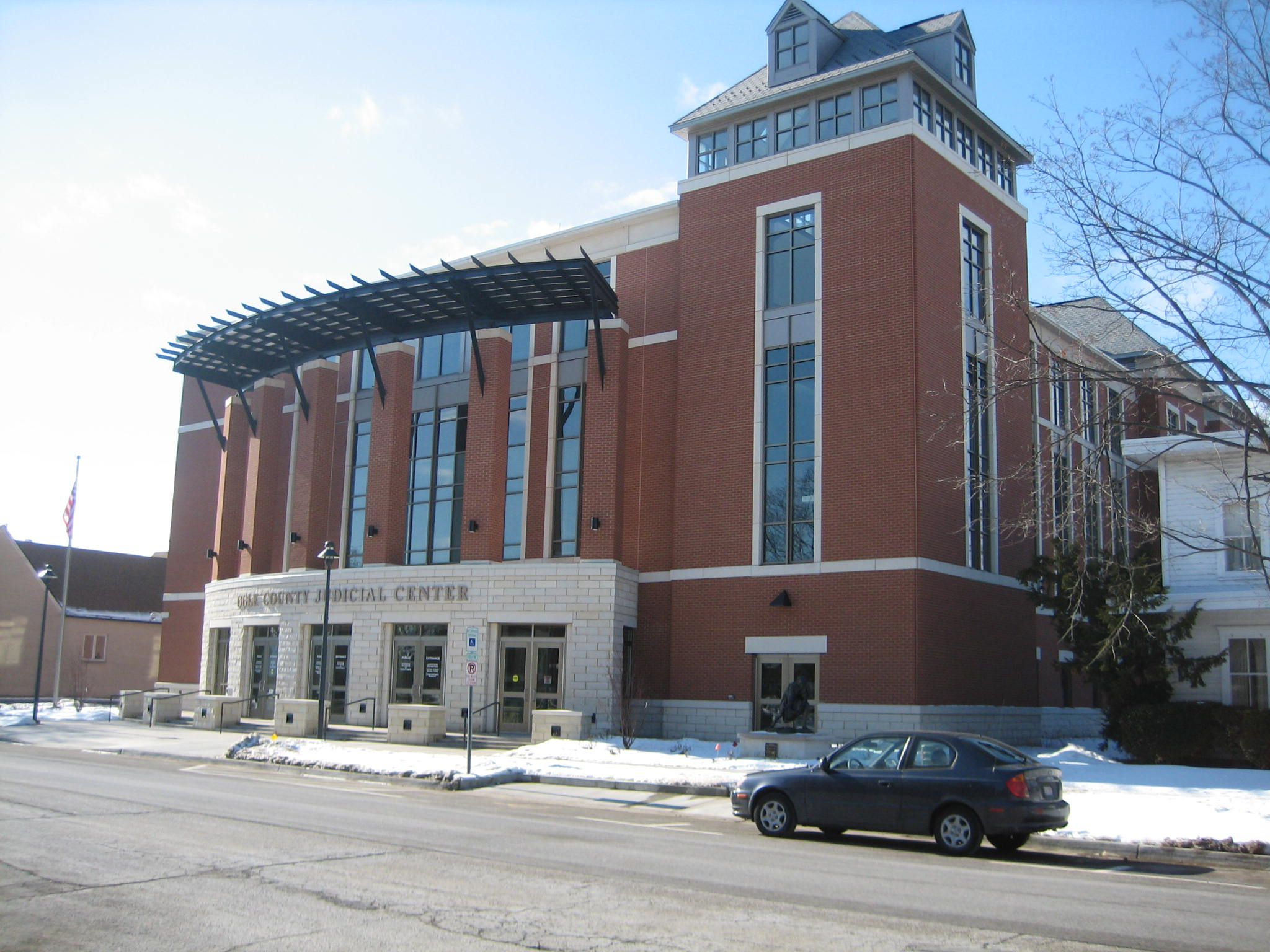
The Ogle County Judicial Center, across the street from the Old Ogle County Courthouse in Oregon, Illinois

Along with its neighbor Lee County, Ogle County is one of the most consistently Republican counties in the nation when it comes to presidential elections. Except for the 1912 election when the GOP was divided between Progressive nominee Theodore Roosevelt and incumbent president William Howard Taft, Ogle County has voted Republican in every Presidential election since the Republican Party first participated in 1856. No Democratic candidate has ever won the county, which favored the Whig Party before the Republican Party was formed.

Historically, Republicans have easily carried the county in statewide and national Democratic landslides. Franklin D. Roosevelt never garnered more than 39 percent of the county's vote in any of his four runs for president. Barry Goldwater had his second-strongest showing in the state here in 1964, with over 60 percent-identical to Lyndon Johnson's winning margin statewide. Illinois' own Barack Obama is the only Democrat to ever win at least 40 percent of the county's vote.

The county is part of Illinois's 16th congressional district. represented by Republican Darin LaHood.

== Transportation ==
=== Transit ===
- List of intercity bus stops in Illinois

=== Major highways ===
- Interstate 39
- Interstate 88
- U.S. Highway 51
- U.S. Highway 52
- Illinois Route 2
- Illinois Route 26
- Illinois Route 38
- Illinois Route 64
- Illinois Route 72
- Illinois Route 110
- Illinois Route 251

=== Airports ===
The following public-use airports are located in the county:

- Ogle County Airport (C55) - Mount Morris, Illinois
- Rochelle Municipal Airport (RPJ) - Rochelle, Illinois

=== Railroads ===
The Union Pacific line to Omaha (Chicago & North Western), BNSF line to Minneapolis (Burlington Route, later Burlington Northern), Canadian Pacific Kansas City line to Sabula (Milwaukee Road) all run through Ogle County.

== Recreation ==
=== Parks ===
- Castle Rock State Park
- Lowden State Park
- Lowden-Miller State Forest
- Sinnissippi Farms
- Weld Park
- White Pines State Park

=== Illinois Nature Preserves ===
- Beach Cemetery Prairie Nature Preserve
- Douglas E. Wade Prairie Nature Preserve
- Jarrett Prairie Nature Preserve
- Nachusa Grasslands

== Communities ==
=== Cities ===
- Byron 3784
- Oregon 3604
- Polo 2291
- Rockford (mostly in Winnebago County)
- Rochelle 9446

=== Villages ===
- Adeline
- Creston
- Davis Junction
- Forreston
- Hillcrest
- Leaf River
- Monroe Center
- Mount Morris
- Stillman Valley

=== Unincorporated communities ===
- Baileyville
- Brookville
- Buffalo Grove
- Chana
- Daysville
- Egan
- Flagg
- Flagg Center
- Hazelhurst (partial)
- Holcomb
- Kings
- Lindenwood
- Paynes Point
- Stratford
- Woosung

=== Census-designated places ===
- Baileyville
- Grand Detour
- Holcomb
- Kings
- Lost Nation

=== Townships ===
- Brookville Township
- Buffalo Township
- Byron Township
- Dement Township
- Eagle Point Township
- Flagg Township
- Forreston Township
- Grand Detour Township
- Lafayette Township
- Leaf River Township
- Lincoln Township
- Lynnville Township
- Marion Township
- Maryland Township
- Monroe Township
- Mount Morris Township
- Oregon-Nashua Township
- Pine Creek Township
- Pine Rock Township
- Rockvale Township
- Scott Township
- Taylor Township
- White Rock Township
- Woosung Township

== Education ==
K-12 school districts include:

- Ashton Community Unit School District 275
- Byron Community Unit School District 226
- Dixon Unit School District 170
- Eastland Community Unit School District 308
- Forrestville Valley Community Unit School District 221
- Hiawatha Community Unit School District 426
- Meridian Community Unit School District 223
- Oregon Community Unit School District 220
- Polo Community Unit School District 222

There is one secondary school district with territory in the county: Rochelle Township High School District 212.

Elementary school districts include:

- Creston Community Consolidated School District 161
- Eswood Community Consolidated District 269
- Kings Consolidated School District 144
- Rochelle Community Consolidated District 231

== See also ==
- List of settlements in Ogle County, Illinois
- List of townships in Ogle County, Illinois
- List of cemeteries in Ogle County, Illinois
- National Register of Historic Places listings in Ogle County, Illinois

=== Bibliography ===
- Kauffman, Horace G.; Kauffman, Rebecca H., eds. (1909). Historical Encyclopedia of Illinois and History of Ogle County. Vol. 2. Chicago: Munsell Publishing Co.
- The History of Ogle County, Illinois. Chicago: H. F. Kett & Co. 1878.
