= Woosung Township, Illinois =

Coordinates: 41°55′07″N 89°32′40″W

Woosung Township
- Township
- Location in Ogle County.
- Country: United States
- State: Illinois
- County: Ogle

Government
  - Supervisor: Matt Shore

Area
  - Total: 17.69 sq mi (45.8 km^{2})
  - Land: 17.69 sq mi (45.8 km^{2})
  - Water: 0 sq mi (0 km^{2}) 0%

Population (2010)
  - Estimate (2016): 373
  - Density: 22/sq mi (8.5/km^{2})
- Time zone: UTC-6 (CST)
  - Summer (DST): UTC-5 (CDT)
- FIPS code: 17-141-83492

Woosung Township is located in Ogle County, Illinois. As of the 2010 census, its population was 389 and it contained 156 housing units.

== Geography ==
According to the 2010 census, the township has a total area of 17.69 square miles (45.8 km^{2}), all land.

== Demographics ==
Historical population
Census	Pop.	Note	%±
2020	363		—
U.S. Decennial Census
