= Pine Creek Township, Illinois =

Pine Creek Township
- Township
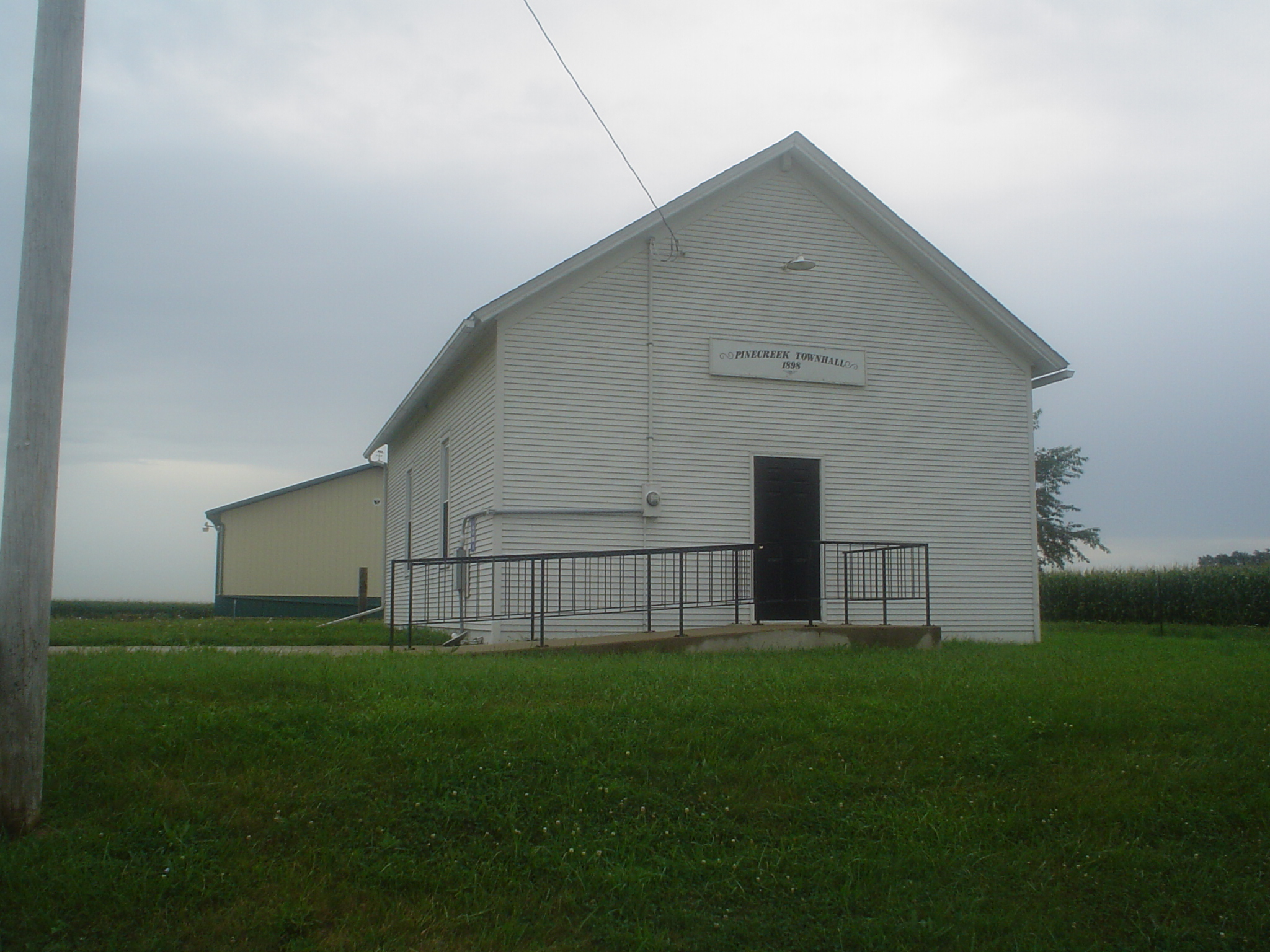
- Town hall

- Location in Ogle County.

- Location within Illinois Pine Creek Township (the United States)
- Coordinates: 41°59′15″N 89°27′15″W
- Country: United States
- State: Illinois
- County: Ogle

Government
  - Supervisor: Lyle Hopkins

Area
  - Total: 39.71 sq mi (102.8 km^{2})
  - Land: 39.7 sq mi (103 km^{2})
  - Water: 0.01 sq mi (0.026 km^{2}) 0.03%

Population (2010)
  - Estimate (2016): 729
  - Density: 19.1/sq mi (7.4/km^{2})
- Time zone: UTC-6 (CST)
  - Summer (DST): UTC-5 (CDT)
- FIPS code: 17-141-59897

Pine Creek Township is located in Ogle County, Illinois, United States. As of the 2010 census, its population was 758 and it contained 320 housing units.

== Geography ==
According to the 2010 census, the township has a total area of 39.71 square miles (102.8 km^{2}), of which 39.7 square miles (103 km^{2}) (or 99.97%) is land and 0.01 square miles (0.026 km^{2}) (or 0.03%) is water.

== Demographics ==
Historical population
Census	Pop.	Note	%±
2016 (est.)	729
U.S. Decennial Census
