= Flagg Township, Illinois =

Flagg Township
- Township
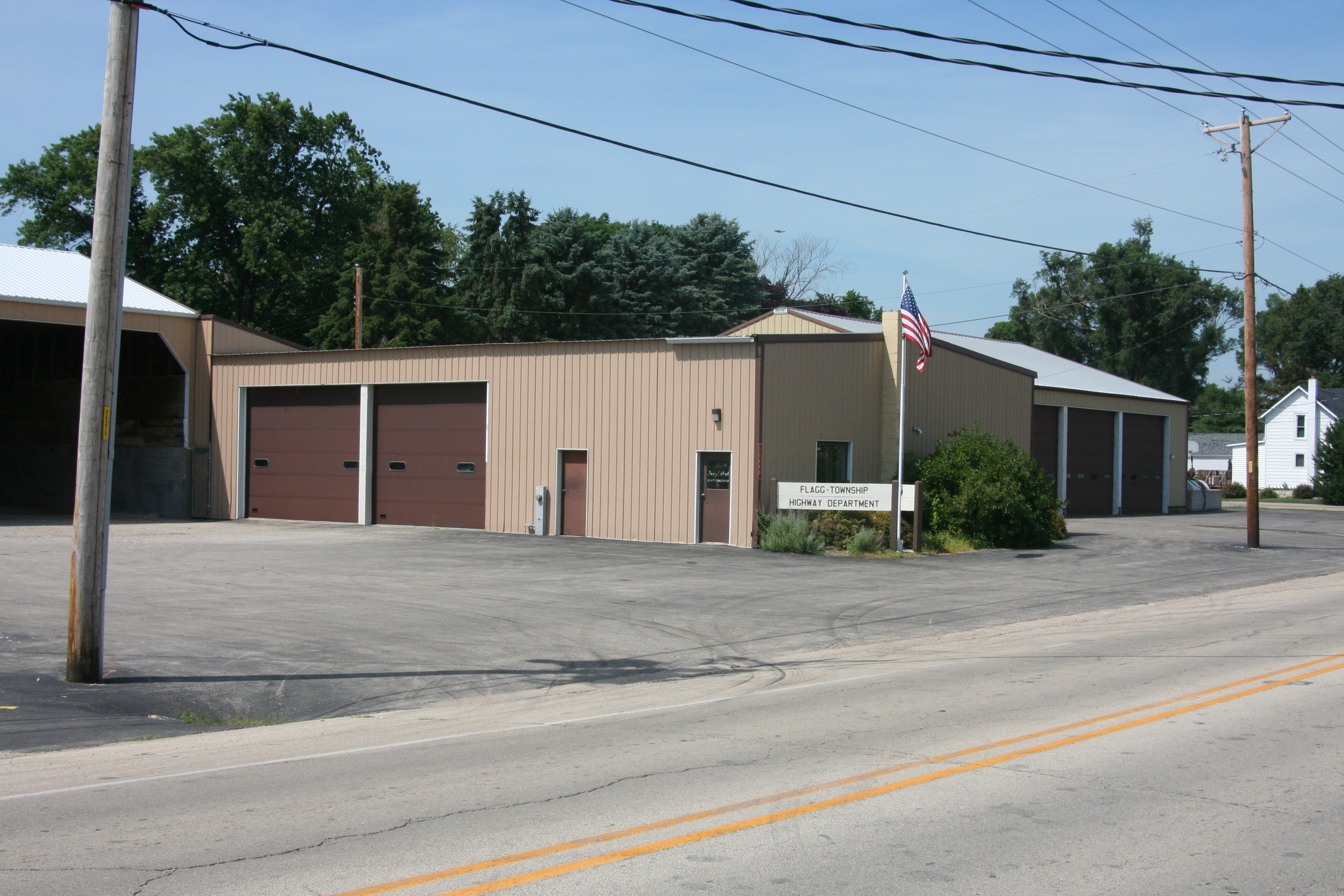
- Flagg Township building.

- Location of Illinois in the United States
- Coordinates: 41°56′14″N 89°06′38″W
- Country: United States
- State: Illinois
- County: Ogle
- Organized: November 6, 1849

Government
  - Mayor: Susan Plumley

Area
  - Total: 35.61 sq mi (92.2 km^{2})
  - Land: 35.52 sq mi (92.0 km^{2})
  - Water: 0.08 sq mi (0.21 km^{2})
- Elevation: 817 ft (249 m)

Population (2010)
  - Estimate (2016): 13,041
  - Density: 381.8/sq mi (147.4/km^{2})
- Time zone: UTC-6 (CST)
  - Summer (DST): UTC-5 (CDT)
- Postal code: 61068
- Area code: 815
- FIPS code: 17-141-26298
- Website: flaggtownship.org

Flagg Township is located in Ogle County, Illinois. As of the 2010 census, its population was 13,562 and it contained 5,525 housing units.

Flagg Township was named for Richard P. Flagg, a pioneer settler.

== Geography ==
According to the 2010 census, the township has a total area of 35.61 square miles (92.2 km^{2}), of which 35.52 square miles (92.0 km^{2}) (or 99.75%) is land and 0.08 square miles (0.21 km^{2}) (or 0.22%) is water.

== Demographics ==
Historical population
Census	Pop.	Note	%±
2016 (est.)	13,041
U.S. Decennial Census
