= Pine Rock Township, Illinois =

Pine Rock Township
- Township
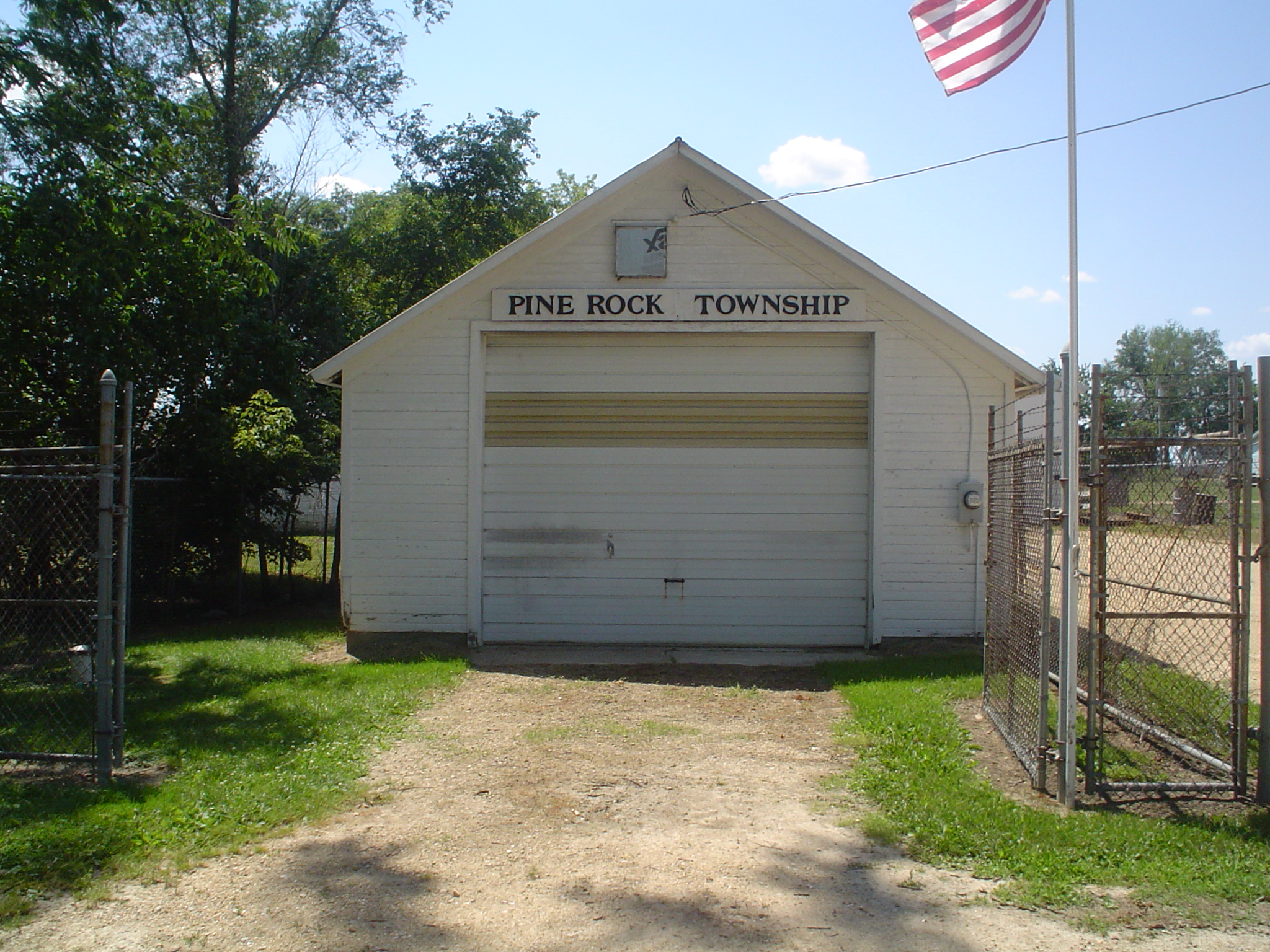
- Pine Rock Township building located in Chana.

- Flag

- Location of Illinois in the United States
- Coordinates: 41°58′51″N 89°13′25″W
- Country: United States
- State: Illinois
- County: Ogle
- Organized: November 6, 1849

Government
  - Mayor: Donald Huntley

Area
  - Total: 38.26 sq mi (99.1 km^{2})
  - Land: 38.23 sq mi (99.0 km^{2})
  - Water: 0.03 sq mi (0.078 km^{2})
- Elevation: 778 ft (237 m)

Population (2010)
  - Estimate (2016): 946
  - Density: 25.8/sq mi (10.0/km^{2})
- Time zone: UTC-6 (CST)
  - Summer (DST): UTC-5 (CDT)
- FIPS code: 17-141-59975

Pine Rock Township is located in Ogle County, Illinois. As of the 2010 census, its population was 985 and it contained 413 housing units.

== Geography ==
According to the 2010 census, the township has a total area of 38.26 square miles (99.1 km^{2}), of which 38.23 square miles (99.0 km^{2}) (or 99.92%) is land and 0.03 square miles (0.078 km^{2}) (or 0.08%) is water.

== Demographics ==
Historical population
Census	Pop.	Note	%±
2016 (est.)	946
U.S. Decennial Census
