= List of cemeteries in Ogle County, Illinois =

This list of cemeteries in Ogle County, Illinois includes currently operating, historical (closed for new interments), and defunct (graves abandoned or removed) cemeteries, columbaria, and mausolea which are historical and/or notable. It does not include pet cemeteries.

== Brookville Township ==
- Brookville Township Cemetery also called Evangelical Cemetery
- Chambers Grove Cemetery, Shannon

== Buffalo Township ==
- Buffalo Grove Cemetery
- St. Mary's Catholic Cemetery
- Fairmount Cemetery
- Reed Cemetery or Rock Springs Cemetery
- William Durley Monument

== Byron Township ==
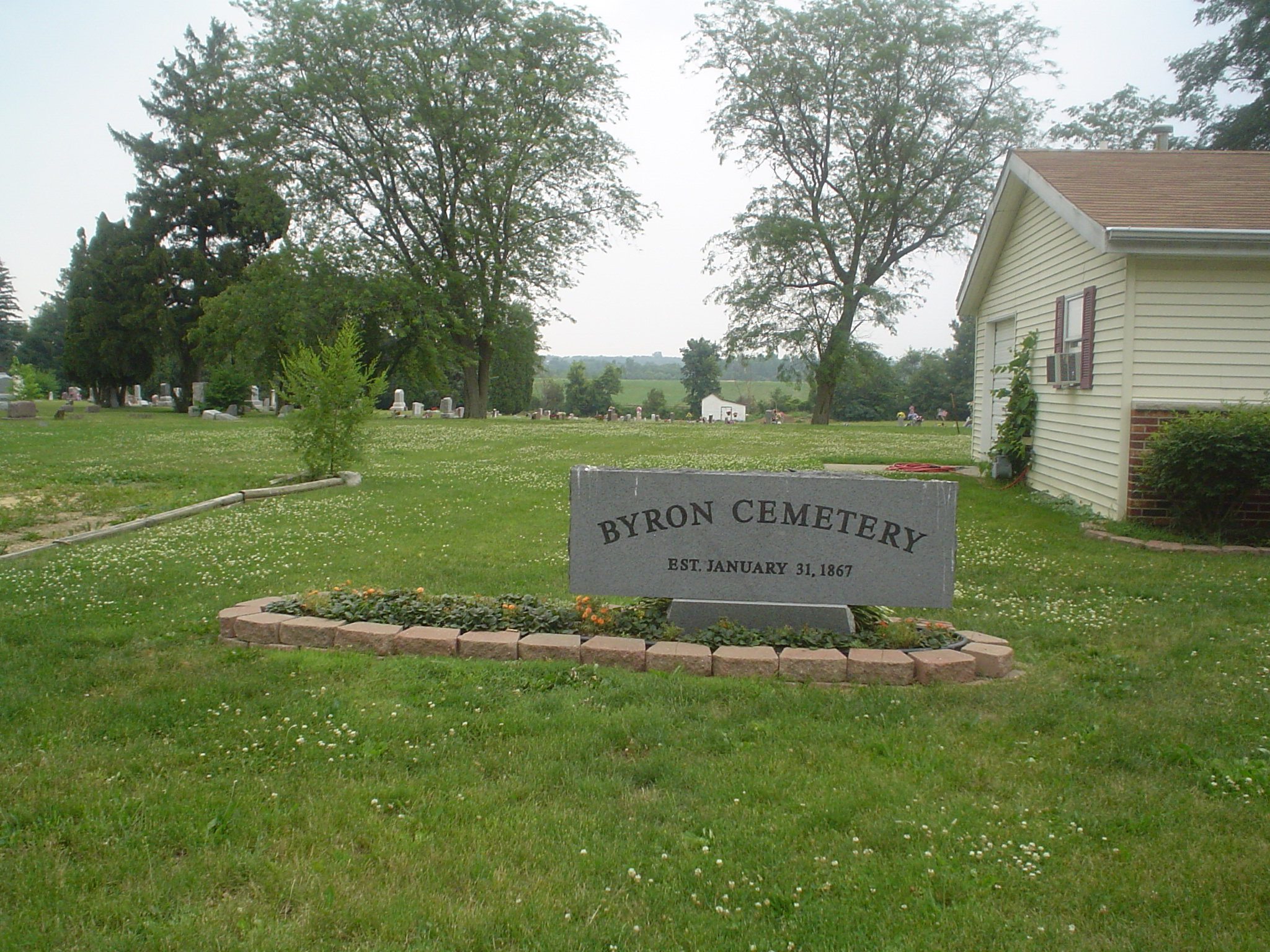
Cemetery in Byron, Illinois.

- Byron Cemetery
- St. Mary's Catholic Cemetery

== Dement Township ==
- Woodlawn Cemetery

== Eagle Point Township ==
- Eagle Point Cemetery
- Elkhorn Cemetery, also called Brick Church Cemetery
- Nichol Cemetery
- Webster Cemetery

== Flagg Township ==
- Flagg Center Cemetery
- Lawnridge Cemetery
- St. Patricks Catholic Cemetery
- Trinity Memorial Cemetery

== Forreston Township ==
- Forreston Grove Cemetery
- Hewitt Cemetery
- Prairie Dell Cemetery
- White Oak Cemetery

== Grand Detour Township ==
- Grand Detour Cemetery

== LaFayette Township ==
- Chapel Hill Cemetery

== Leaf River Township ==
- Egan Cemetery
- Lightsville Cemetery
- North Grove Christian Cemetery
- North Grove Evangelical Cemetery

== Lincoln Township ==
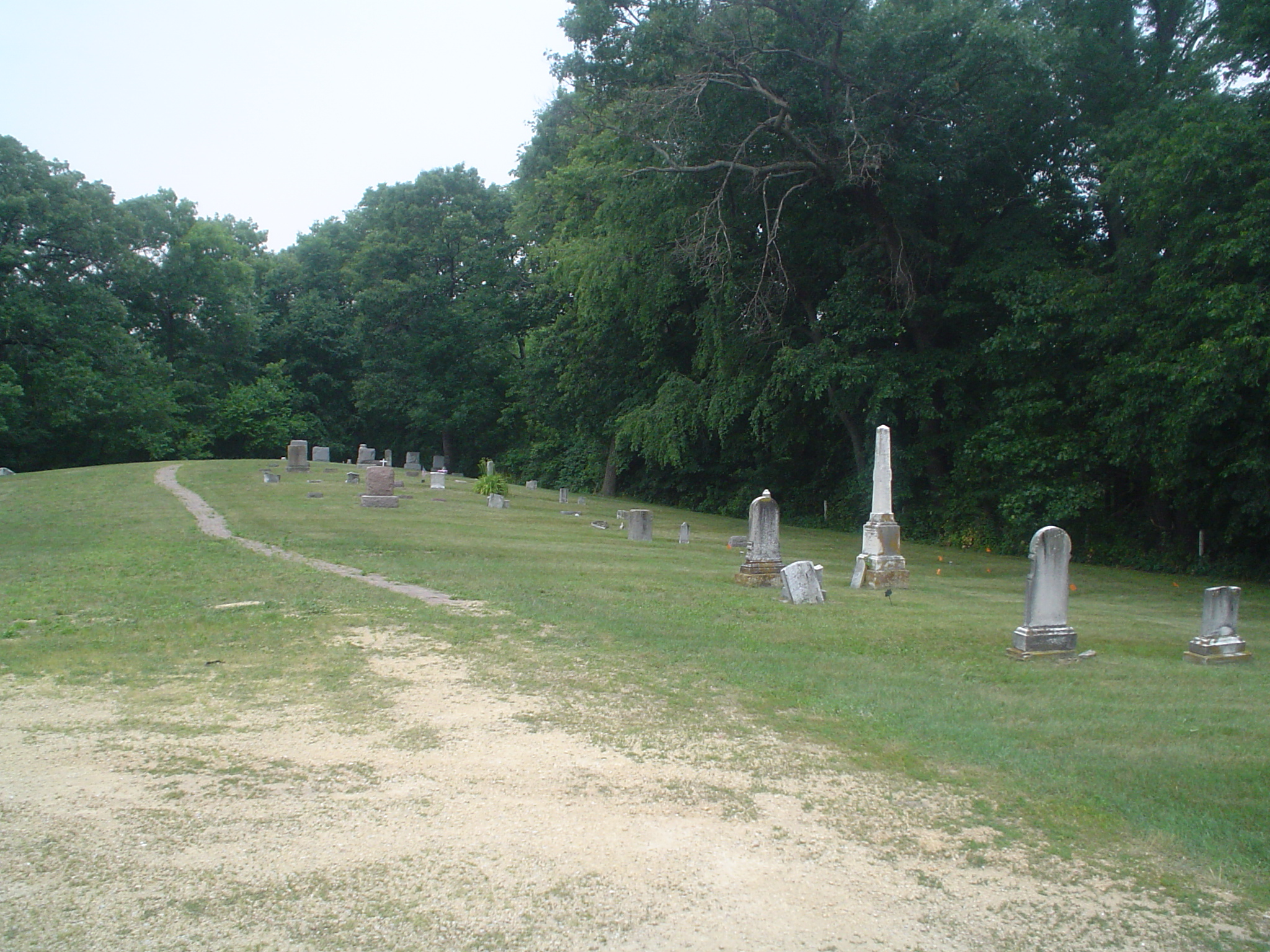
Cemetery in Marion Township, Ogle County, Illinois.

- Haldane Cemetery
- West Branch Cemetery or Maryland Cemetery
- West Grove Cemetery
- Lynnville Lindenwood Cemetery

== Lynnville Township ==
- Lindenwood Cemetery

== Marion Township ==
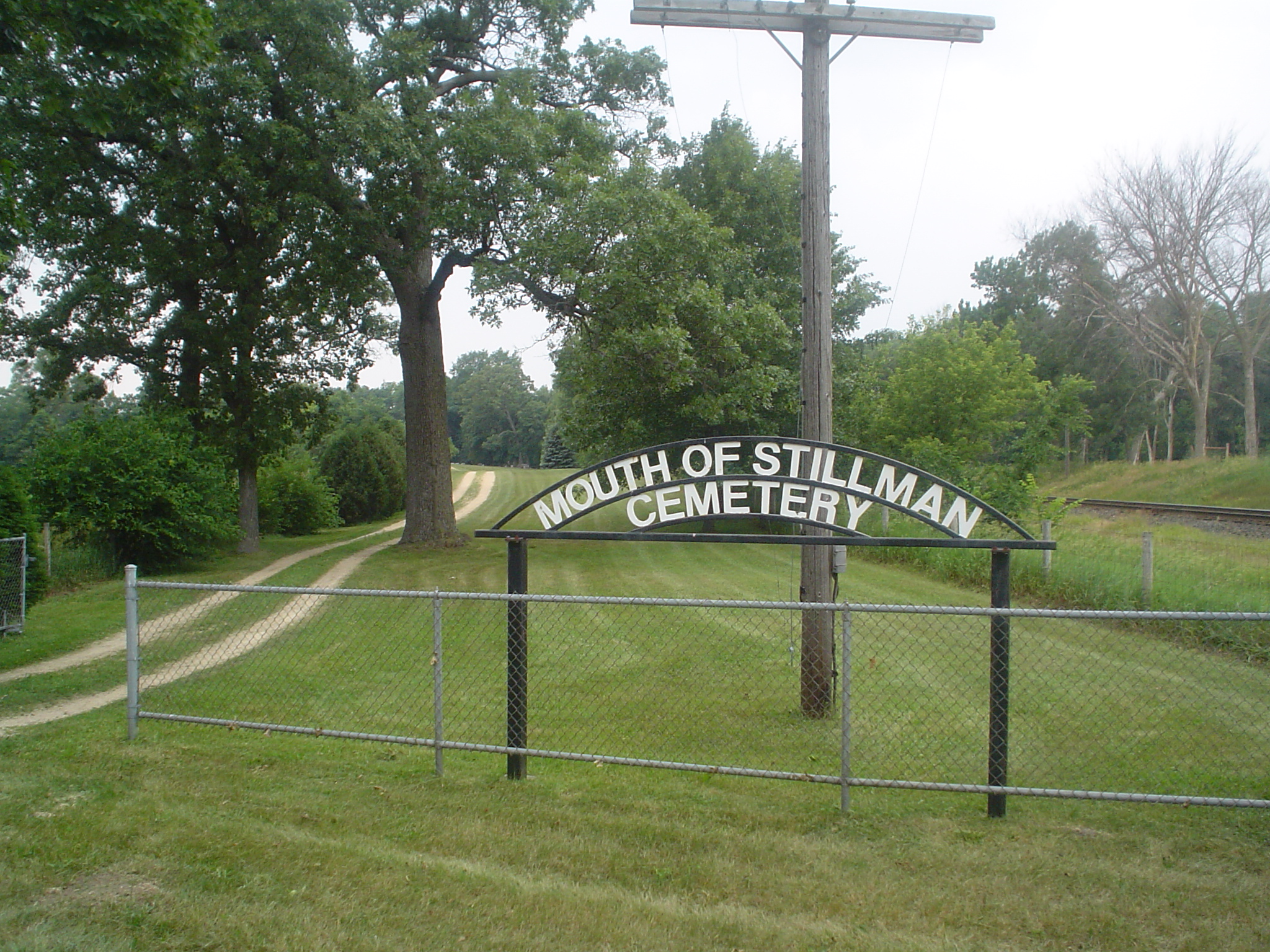
Cemetery in Marion Township, Illinois

- Stillman's Run Battle Site, Stillman Valley
- Mouth Of Stillman Cemetery, Byron
- Stillman Valley Cemetery

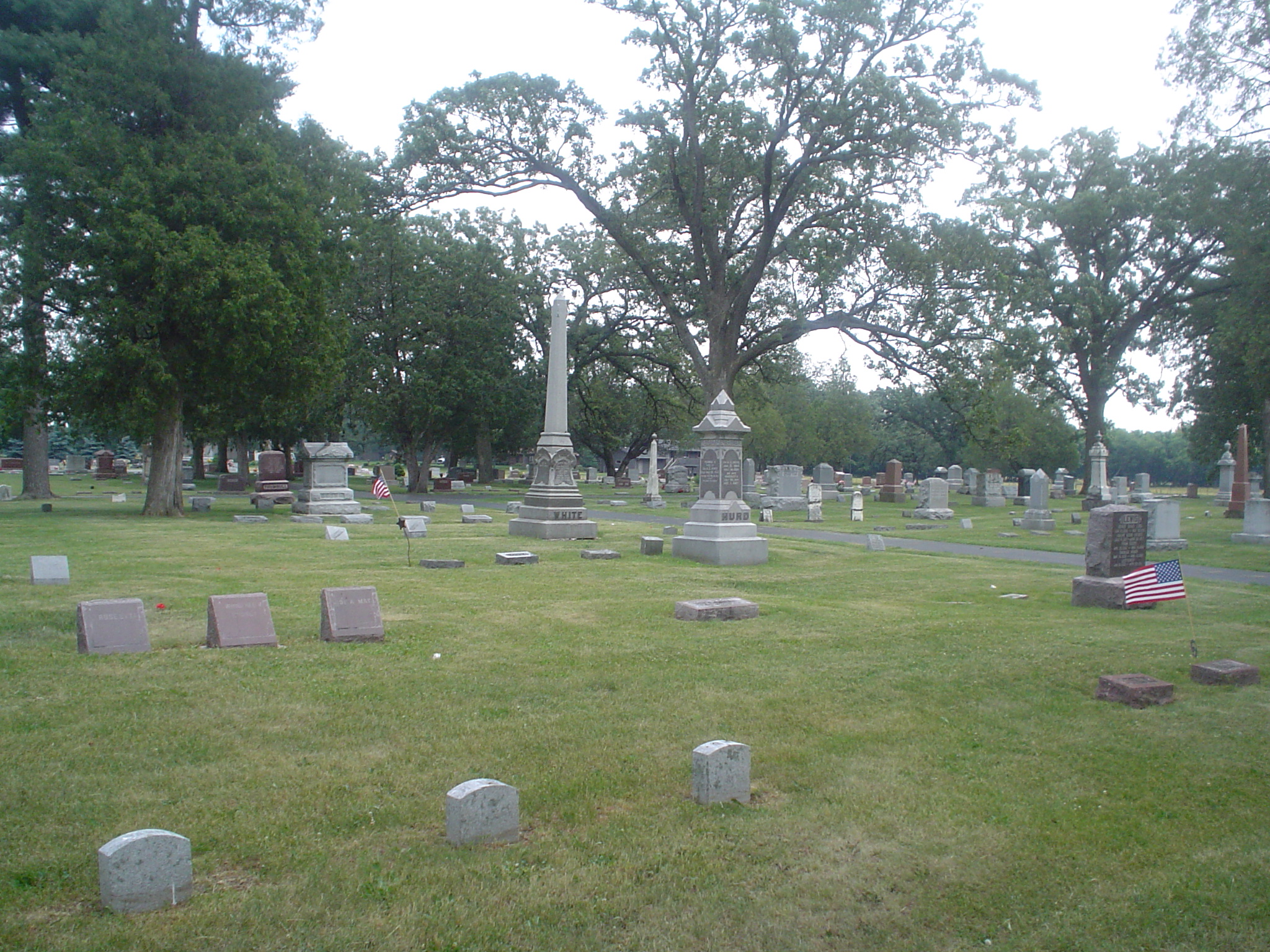
Cemetery in Stillman Valley, Illinois.

== Maryland Township ==
- Adeline Cemetery
- Adeline U.B. Cemetery
- Coffman Cemetery
- North Grove Zion Evangelical Reformed Cemetery

== Monroe Township ==
- Bennett Cemetery or Porter Cemetery
- Roseland Cemetery or Dutchtown Cemetery
- Kilbuck Cemetery
- Monroe Center Cemetery

== Mt. Morris Township ==
- Oakwood Cemetery
- Plainview Cemetery
- Rice Cemetery
- Silver Creek Cemetery

== Oregon-Nashua Township ==
- County Farm Cemetery
- Daysville Cemetery
- Lighthouse Cemetery
- Riverside Cemetery
- Riverview Cemetery
- St. Bride's Episcopal Cemetery
- St. Mary's Catholic Cemetery

== Pine Creek Township ==
- Pine Creek Brethren Cemetery
- Cedar Hill or Salem Cemetery
- Mt. Zion Cemetery
- Oak Ridge Cemetery
- Evergreen Cemetery or Pine Creek Christian Cemetery
- Coffman Farm

== Pine Rock Township ==
- Cooley Cemetery or Seaworth Cemetery
- Mt. Pleasant Cemetery
- Emmanuel Lutheran Cemetery
- Stinsonian Cemetery
- Washington Grove Cemetery

== Rockvale Township ==
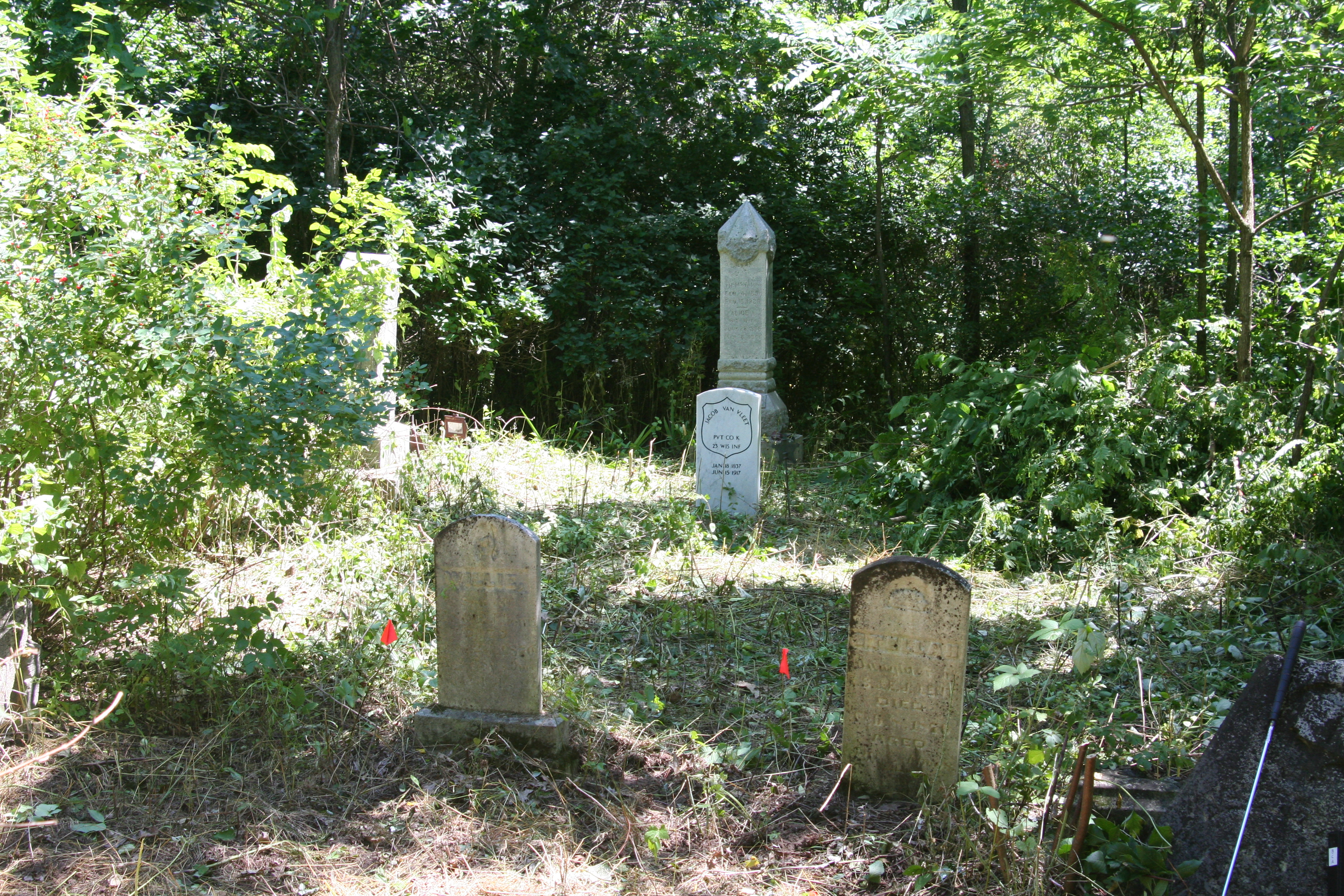
Cemetery in Rockvale Township, Ogle County, Illinois.

- Bald Hill Cemetery or Camling Cemetery
- Brooklyn Cemetery
- Ebenezer Reformed Cemetery
- Wertz Cemetery or Jacob Good Farm

== Scott Township ==
- Beach Cemetery
- Big Mound Cemetery

== White Rock Township ==
- Bethel Cemetery or Hayes Cemetery
- White Rock Cemetery
- Lucas Cemetery or Hathaway Cemetery
- Chaney Cemetery
- Egbert Cemetery or Aubery Brown Cemetery
- Stocking Cemetery

== See also ==
- List of cemeteries in the United States
- List of cemeteries in Illinois
- List of cemeteries in Vermilion County, Illinois
