= Byron Nuclear Generating Station =

Nuclear power plant located in Ogle County, Illinois

Byron Clean Energy Center
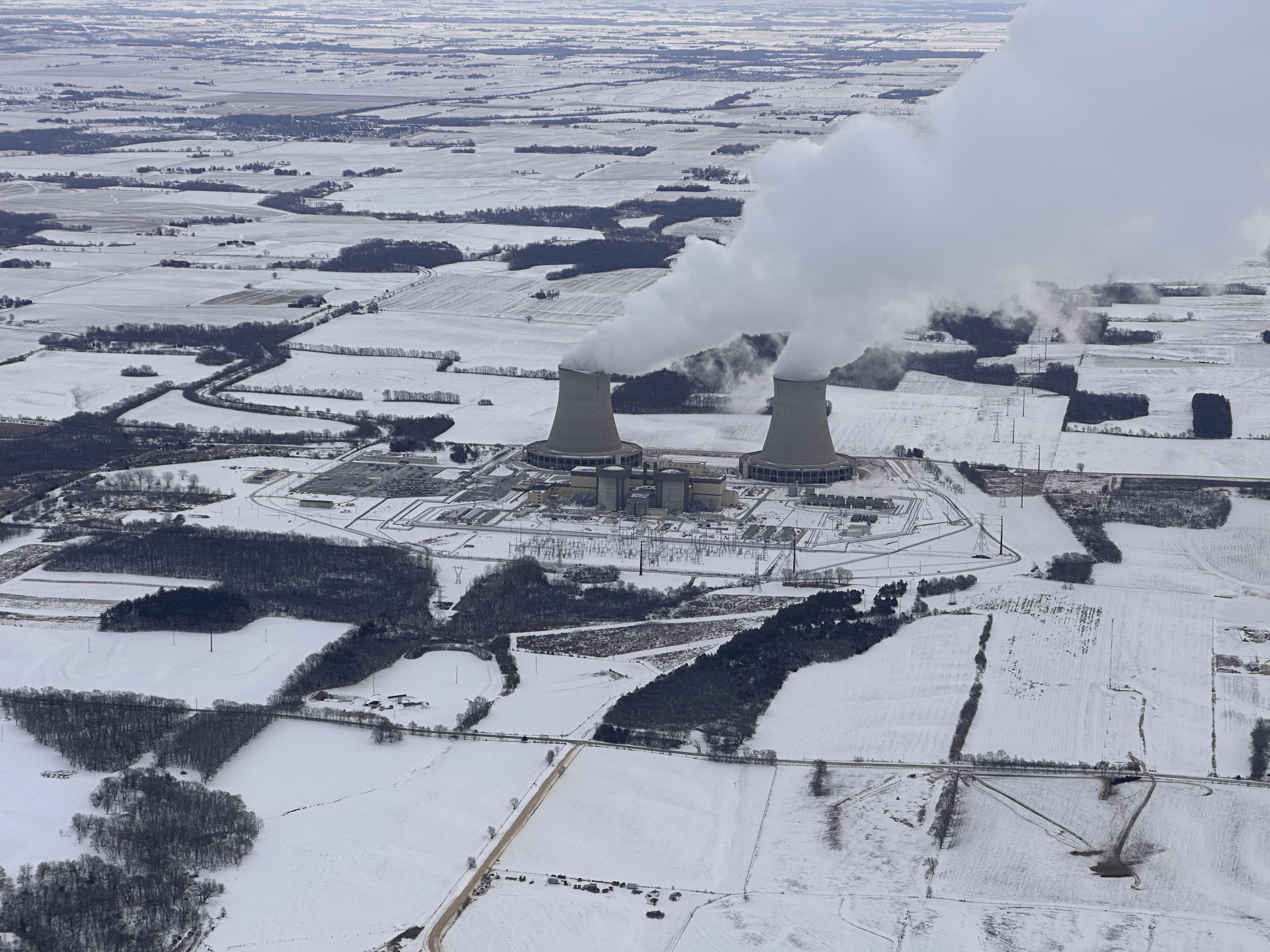
- Byron Clean Energy Center
- Official name: Byron Clean Energy Center
- Country: United States
- Location: Rockvale Township, Ogle County, near Byron, Illinois
- Coordinates: 42°4′27″N 89°16′55″W
- Status: Operational
- Construction began: April 1, 1975
- Commission date: Unit 1: September 16, 1985; Unit 2: August 2, 1987
- Construction cost: $4.5 billion (2007 USD)
- Owner: Constellation Energy
- Operator: Constellation Energy
- Employees: 727

Nuclear power station
- Reactor type: PWR
- Reactor supplier: Westinghouse
- Cooling towers: 2 × Natural Draft
- Cooling source: Rock River
- Thermal capacity: 2 × 3645 MW_{th}

Power generation
- Units operational: 1 × 1164 MW; 1 × 1136 MW
- Make and model: WH 4-loop (DRYAMB)
- Nameplate capacity: 2347 MW
- Capacity factor: 97.8% (2019); 88.45% (lifetime)
- Annual net output: 20,118 GWh (2019)

External links
- Website: Byron Clean Energy Center
- Commons: Related media on Commons

The Byron Clean Energy Center is a nuclear power plant located in Ogle County, Illinois, 2 miles (3.2 km) east of the Rock River. The reactor buildings were constructed by Commonwealth Edison and house two Westinghouse Four-Loop pressurized water reactors, Unit 1 and Unit 2, which began operation in September 1985 and August 1987 respectively. The plant is owned and operated by Constellation Energy.

The plant provides electricity to northern Illinois and the city of Chicago. In 2005 it generated on average about 2,450 MWe, enough power to supply about 2 million average American homes. The station employs over 600 people, mostly from Ogle and Winnebago counties, and features two prominent 495-foot (151 m) cooling towers.

The Byron plant has been subject to some controversy with respect to a lawsuit in 1981 with concerns over tritium contamination in groundwater. Tritium contamination at Byron and other Illinois nuclear power plants led the state of Illinois to pass legislation requiring plants to report such contamination to the state within 24 hours.

== History ==
Construction on Byron Clean Energy Center began in 1975, at a 1,782-acre (7.2 km^{2}) site, 17 miles (27 km) southwest of Rockford, Illinois, south of the city of Byron in Ogle County. The firm of Sargent & Lundy acted as consulting engineer during construction and Babcock & Wilcox oversaw the completion of the reactor vessels. Before construction was completed on the reactor vessels and facilities, at least three groups joined in a 1981 lawsuit to halt Byron Nuclear Generating Station's completion. The League of Women Voters, DeKalb Area Alliance for Responsible Energy, and others were involved in the lawsuit over the safety of and need for the plant. In 1984 the Atomic Safety and Licensing Board, a division of the U.S. Nuclear Regulatory Commission (NRC), stopped the planned nuclear station at Byron by refusing its owners, then Commonwealth Edison, permission to begin operation. The decision stemmed from concerns about the quality control of independent contractors hired during construction. Ultimately, the board overturned its decision in October 1984 and permission was granted to operate after a re-inspection of over 200,000 items and components within the plant.

Byron Station consists of two pressurized water reactors, termed Byron Unit One and Byron Unit Two, and the surrounding grounds and facilities. Byron Unit One received its operating license from the NRC on February 14, 1985 and Unit Two received its license on January 30, 1987. On September 16, 1985, Unit One entered commercial service and power began to be generated at Byron. The operating licenses for the two reactors are set to expire two years apart: Initially, Unit One's license expired on October 31, 2024, and Unit Two's on November 6, 2026. On May 29, 2013 Exelon Generation Co. applied to renew the licences and on November 19, 2015, based on a final safety evaluation report (July 6, 2015) and a supplemental environmental impact statement (July 15, 2015), the Nuclear Regulatory Commission renewed both operating licenses for an additional 20 years. The renewed licenses authorize Unit One to operate through October 31, 2044, and Unit Two through Nov. 6, 2046.

In August 2020, Exelon decided to close the plant in September 2021 for economic reasons, despite the plant having licenses to operate for another 20 years. Exelon stated it would continue discussions with policymakers to try to obtain support to prevent the closure. In August 2021, Exelon stated a proposed $15/MWh federal production tax credit (PTC) would not be legislated in time to avoid closing Byron and Dresden. However, by September 13, 2021, the Illinois Senate approved a bill containing nearly $700 million in subsidies for the state's nuclear plants, including Byron, causing Exelon to reverse the shutdown order.

== Facilities and output ==
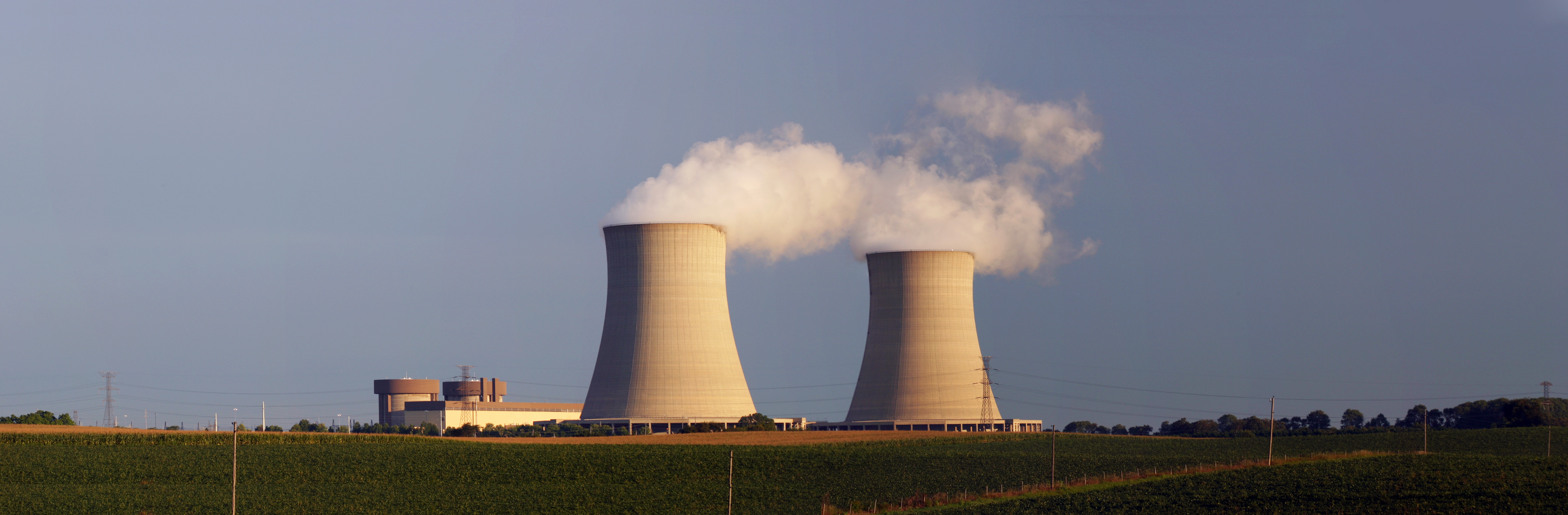
Byron Nuclear Generating Station is located near the small city of Byron, Illinois, 17 miles (27 km) from Rockford, Illinois.

The two Westinghouse four-loop pressurized-water reactors each have an electrical output of over 1,000 MWe. Byron has 2 units capable of generating 2347 net megawatts (MW) of electricity. In 2009 the reactors operated at 96.4% capacity and produced 19.7 million MWh of electricity; enough power for 2 million average American households. The two cooling towers at Byron rise 495 feet (151 m) over the site.

A U.S. government animation of a pressurized water reactor

The plant utilizes non-contact cooling water from the Rock River, situated 2 miles (3.2 km) to the west. The water used in the process of generating electricity is cooled in the station's two cooling towers and recirculated via the plant's blowdown line back into the Rock River. Other water, from Byron's Radioactive Waste Treatment system, is transferred to the Refueling Water Storage Tank (RWST), where it is analyzed and sampled for contamination. Once it passes through analysis, the water is discharged down the blowdown line into the river.

According to former plant owner Exelon, the Byron station is operated by about 850 Exelon employees and another 50 permanent contractors. Most of Byron's employees reside in Ogle and Winnebago Counties in northern Illinois. The plant paid US$31.1 million in taxes in 2009 to various local taxing bodies.

Two power uprates have been approved by the NRC for each reactor since inception. The first uprate was approved on May 4, 2001 allowing for additional 175.6 MWt for each reactor and the second occurring on February 7, 2014 allowing for an increased 58.4 MWt. These uprates represented a 5% and 1.6% percentage increase in capacity, respectively.

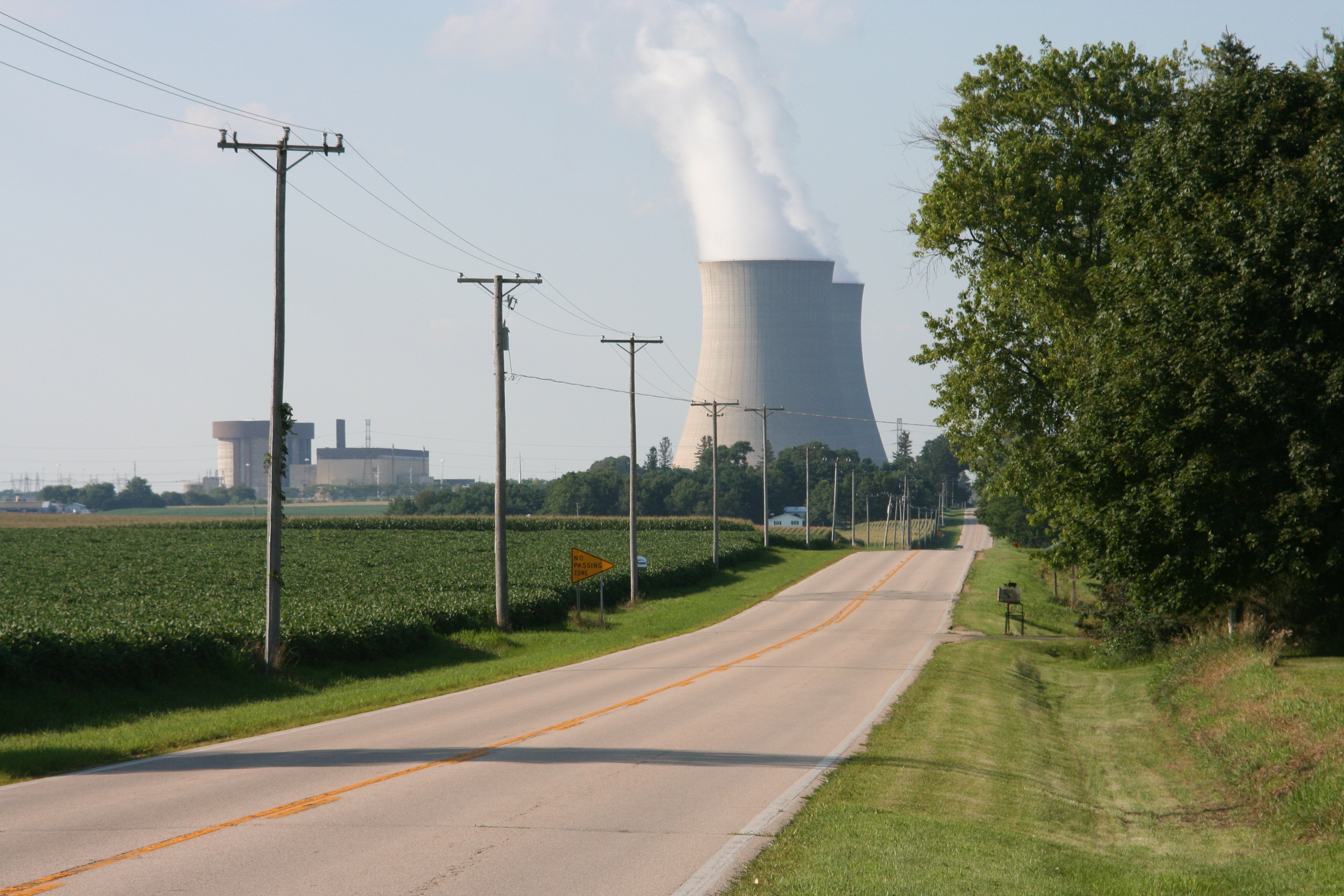
The two cooling towers at Byron Nuclear Generating Station rise 495 feet (151 m) into the air.

== Electricity production ==
Generation (MWh) of Byron Nuclear Generation Station
Year	Jan	Feb	Mar	Apr	May	Jun	Jul	Aug	Sep	Oct	Nov	Dec	Annual (Total)
2001	1,729,864	1,564,673	1,717,255	1,158,782	1,751,100	1,641,486	1,783,835	1,786,297	1,695,657	1,712,548	1,747,359	1,799,626	20,088,482
2002	1,783,147	1,598,042	1,197,804	1,735,914	1,747,443	1,532,673	1,760,733	1,764,931	1,296,911	1,453,548	1,700,911	1,793,412	19,365,469
2003	1,792,766	1,615,781	1,789,987	1,721,516	1,777,377	1,717,579	1,766,450	1,760,659	1,424,700	1,317,227	1,695,495	1,762,715	20,142,252
2004	1,712,598	1,636,413	1,485,923	1,420,552	1,740,796	1,677,204	1,728,362	1,730,918	1,676,216	1,747,429	1,693,338	1,754,815	20,004,564
2005	1,752,875	1,547,345	998,271	1,682,708	1,744,558	1,664,504	1,727,387	1,725,907	1,501,951	1,318,779	1,697,970	1,757,302	19,119,557
2006	1,774,974	1,586,440	1,757,645	1,689,540	1,744,722	1,681,211	1,717,429	1,725,840	1,091,778	1,266,352	1,698,807	1,757,033	19,491,771
2007	1,757,322	1,585,181	1,717,230	870,553	1,603,866	1,677,391	1,730,460	1,725,752	1,680,381	1,068,411	1,680,786	1,755,434	18,852,767
2008	1,755,923	1,641,625	1,514,680	1,255,888	1,744,775	1,676,486	1,724,970	1,729,517	1,678,233	1,185,062	1,696,853	1,753,514	19,357,526
2009	1,753,623	1,567,483	1,749,793	1,685,541	1,737,175	1,663,157	1,720,885	1,722,866	1,181,814	1,493,817	1,690,392	1,751,727	19,718,273
2010	1,750,806	1,582,873	1,744,912	1,318,506	1,505,558	1,669,604	1,718,354	1,719,234	1,658,662	1,741,543	1,696,549	1,749,111	19,855,712
2011	1,750,384	1,578,989	1,219,635	952,664	1,546,551	1,647,264	1,689,604	1,698,594	1,315,953	1,408,623	1,663,735	1,730,499	18,202,495
2012	1,686,270	1,408,487	1,442,717	1,637,505	1,678,344	1,580,553	1,413,391	1,591,435	1,011,222	1,470,059	1,670,833	1,727,462	18,318,278
2013	1,731,787	1,564,012	1,666,358	1,028,046	1,685,574	1,656,613	1,706,073	1,706,956	1,656,737	1,728,880	1,677,446	1,738,579	19,547,061
2014	1,699,318	1,585,959	1,206,646	1,690,976	1,746,736	1,680,172	1,737,523	1,732,053	1,624,505	1,075,736	1,712,233	1,760,524	19,252,381
2015	1,769,667	1,593,555	1,529,882	1,686,447	1,731,061	1,680,698	1,730,459	1,733,771	1,165,478	1,577,189	1,515,070	1,758,136	19,471,413
2016	1,735,812	1,650,499	1,749,121	1,313,952	1,260,178	1,672,051	1,724,944	1,711,285	1,658,824	1,658,497	1,697,791	1,767,294	19,600,248
2017	1,761,453	1,517,249	975,878	1,701,612	1,747,423	1,678,869	1,731,167	1,739,853	1,653,675	1,159,936	1,704,183	1,772,746	19,144,044
2018	1,770,144	1,597,920	1,768,035	1,694,976	1,729,762	1,666,299	1,727,708	1,712,478	1,135,521	1,755,689	1,717,790	1,774,701	20,051,023
2019	1,773,111	1,600,582	1,743,034	1,178,161	1,755,091	1,685,248	1,726,456	1,735,523	1,678,296	1,753,136	1,717,724	1,771,619	20,117,981
2020	1,773,519	1,632,732	1,144,807	1,707,680	1,742,935	1,676,740	1,724,263	1,732,474	1,620,147	1,287,025	1,709,997	1,772,575	19,524,894
2021	1,766,607	1,601,180	1,765,715	1,703,921	1,752,923	1,677,009	1,731,867	1,696,820	1,096,222	1,701,146	1,704,167	1,772,075	19,969,652
2022	1,761,285	1,599,485	1,738,847	1,235,764	1,387,946	1,674,882	1,725,730	1,727,391	1,683,048	1,756,383	1,711,175	1,739,820	19,741,756
2023	1,771,211	1,593,047	1,173,498	1,700,850	1,747,886	1,680,324	1,728,617	1,727,375	1,662,360	1,198,258	1,712,537	1,769,625	19,465,588
2024	1,770,760	1,651,853	1,758,556	1,696,010	1,735,355	1,658,323	1,725,766	1,716,280	1,023,455	1,637,950	1,706,588	1,767,817	19,848,713
2025	1,764,884	1,595,251	1,744,308	1,154,853	1,676,756	1,665,808	1,710,859	1,721,627	1,671,120	1,742,173	1,702,427	1,764,386	19,914,452
2026	1,764,337	1,557,724	879,494	1,634,276	1,775,893	1,699,650	1,741,578	1,731,624					--

== Surrounding groundwater and elevated levels of tritium ==
There are two underground aquifers within the first 230 feet (70.1 m) below the power station: the upper aquifer is known as the Galena-Platteville Aquifer and the lower aquifer is known as the St. Peter Sandstone Aquifer. The two bodies of water are separated by a layer of shale and thus not connected.

In February 2006, Exelon reported elevated tritium levels in the groundwater beneath the site. Tritium levels were elevated in two of six test wells, according to an Exelon release in February which noted that tritium concentrations of 86,000 pCi/L (2.3 MBq/L) were detected in standing water in underground concrete vaults along the plant's blowdown line. The company stated that the levels posed no risk to public or employee safety. The report coincided with ongoing tritium concerns at the Exelon-owned Braidwood Nuclear Generating Station near Braceville, Illinois. In September, elevated tritium levels were found at Byron in three monitoring wells adjacent to vacuum breaker vaults along the blowdown line. Two of the areas with elevated tritium were found in the shallow portions of the Galena-Platteville Aquifer, while the third location contained elevated tritium levels at the bottom of the same aquifer.

Tritium is a very low level beta emitter with an approximate half-life of 12.3 years and it cannot penetrate the outer dead layer of skin. The main concern with this isotope is inhalation or ingestion. None of the September levels exceeded the 20,000 pCi/L U.S. Environmental Protection Agency drinking water standard.

On April 12, 2006 the Illinois Environmental Protection Agency (IEPA) issued a violation notice to Exelon concerning Byron Nuclear Generating Station. The notice cited the company for violations of state environmental laws related to the "impairment of resource groundwater", discharging waste-containing contaminants from areas other than the permitted points, and violations of other requirements of the plant's discharge permit.

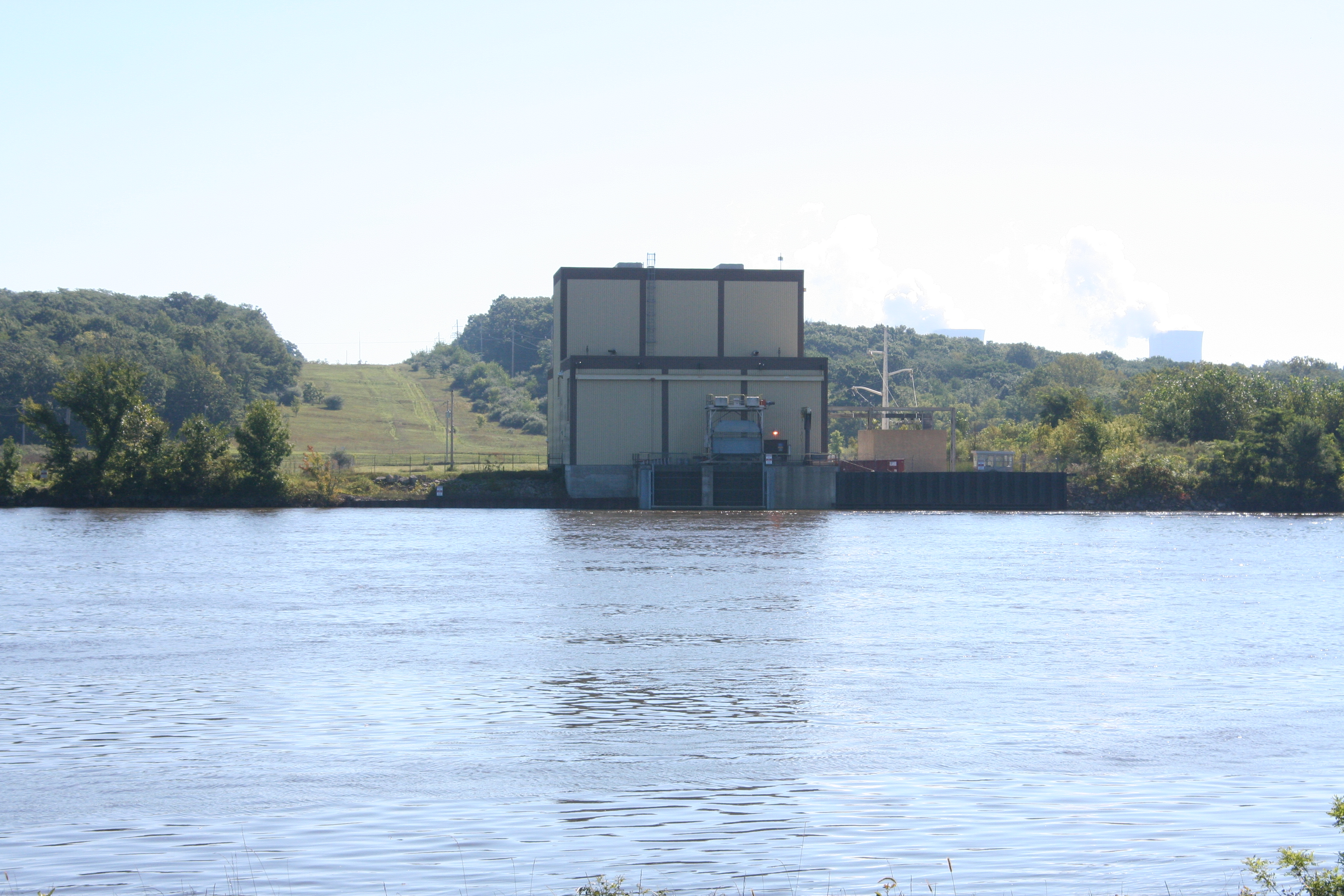
The water facility that brings water to and from the Byron Plant from the Rock River.

Due to the tritium contamination at Byron, Braidwood and Dresden nuclear power plants in Illinois, the state government passed a law requiring power plants to report the release of radioactive contaminants into the soil, surface water or ground water to the state within 24 hours. Before the law was passed, companies operating nuclear plants were only required to report such releases to the federal NRC. The law was introduced by Illinois State Representative Careen Gordon and State Senator Gary Dahl, and was signed by Illinois Governor Rod Blagojevich on June 11, 2006 and became effective immediately upon his signature. The state government only found out about the tritium releases at the Exelon-owned plants after local officials near the Braidwood plant informed them. Following that revelation, other information about spills at Braidwood, Byron, and Dresden came to light. The state of Illinois contended that it was not informed of the leaks by Exelon in a timely manner. The law also required all Illinois nuclear power plants to submit to quarterly inspections by the IEPA and the Illinois Emergency Management Agency.

== Safety ==
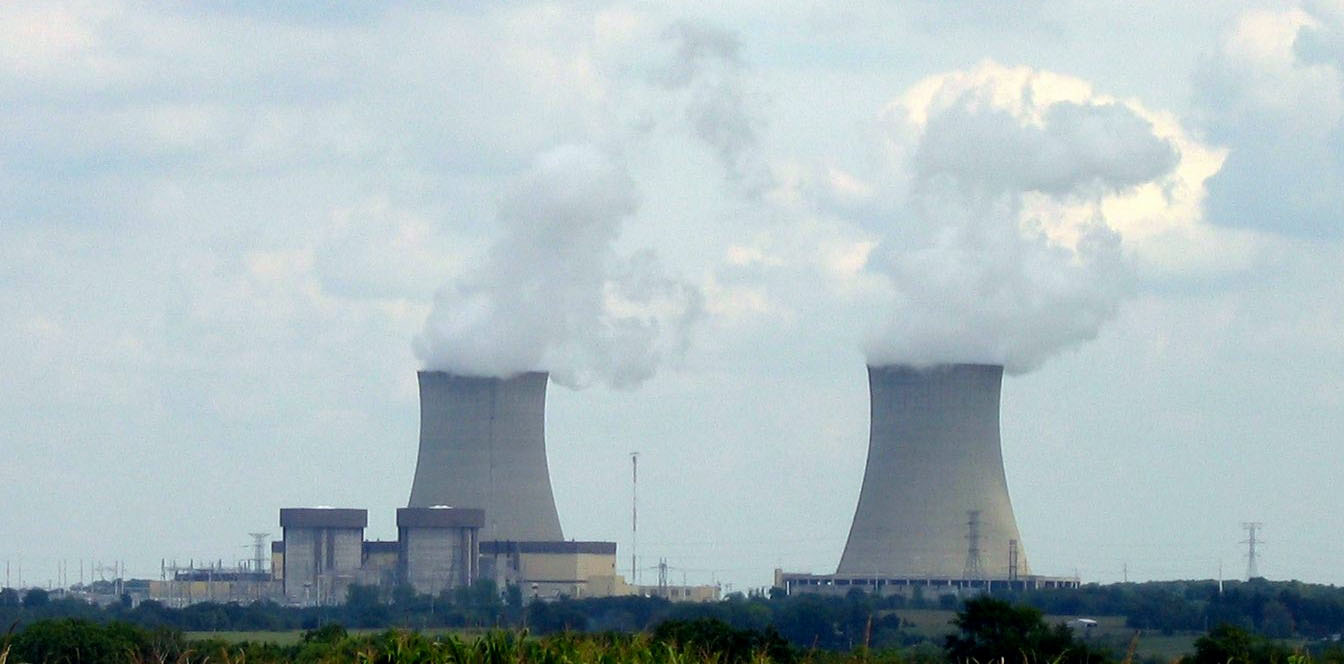
A closer view of Byron Nuclear Generating Station, including both containment buildings, in August 2005

As of the second quarter of 2007, Byron Clean Energy Center scored in the "green" in every Nuclear Regulatory Commission (NRC) inspection category but one. The NRC has four levels of inspection findings; the levels are color-coded and the colors equate with risk levels. Green inspection findings represent very low risk significance. Higher levels, from white, to yellow, to red, show increasing levels of risk. For any inspection findings greater than green, the NRC conducts follow-up inspections. Unit One scored "green" in every category, while Unit Two scored "white", a step down from "green", on the inspection of the heat removal system. The inspection covered several other significant areas, including unplanned scrams, the alert and notification system and the emergency AC power system. From 2001–2005, no inspections of Byron Clean Energy Center found any condition that merited a greater than "green" designation, during the same time period inspection found 71 green conditions at the Byron plant.

Byron, like most U.S. nuclear plants, has been the subject of various actions by the NRC. Escalated Enforcement Actions represent one type. From 1997–2007 the Byron plant has received five such actions, two of which resulted in a total of $150,000 in fines. A $100,000 fine was issued on February 27, 1997 due to problems with excessive silt build up in two separate locations at the Byron facility; the NRC fined the plant $50,000 for each problem. The NRC levied an additional $55,000 in fines in October 1997 when the plant failed technical specifications surveillance guidelines. Specifically, they violated rules that require the Emergency Core Cooling System (ECCS) pump casing and discharge piping high points be vented once every 31 days. The potential safety consequence of the violation affiliated with the second fine was considered "low." As of 2007, the last NRC Escalated Enforcement Action against the Bryon Station came in 2005 when an engineer deliberately falsified surveillance reports to show he had completed work that was incomplete; though the plant could have been fined up to $60,000 the NRC chose not to impose the fine.

A small fire occurred at the plant on the morning of February 24, 2006. The fire was confined to the Unit 1 Refueling Water Storage Tank (RWST) heater. Initial attempts to extinguish the fire were unsuccessful, following those attempts a breaker was opened and the heater was allowed to deenergize which extinguished the fire. Units 1 and 2 were operating at 100%, but neither reactor was shut down as a result of the fire. As a result of the fire the plant declared an "unusual event", the least serious of the four categories of emergency declarations by the Nuclear Regulatory Commission.

On January 30, 2012, the Byron Unit 2 was shut down and depressurized after a failed insulator in the plant's switchyard caused the loss of one phase to the plant's startup transformers. This caused low voltage conditions on the plant's emergency power buses and also for two of the reactor coolant pumps to trip which caused the plant to shut down. The trip of the plant then caused the other two reactor coolant pumps to trip (as they had been receiving power directly from the main generator) and natural circulation had to be used during the shutdown. When operators discovered the loss of the single phase, they manually tripped the breaker feeding the startup transformers, allowing the emergency diesel generators to start and restore normal voltages to the safety buses. Steam was vented from the non-radioactive, secondary side of the plant to aid in the cooling process while the turbines remained offline. A small amount of radioactive tritium was released into the local environment during the initial venting procedure, but was deemed no threat to the public by the Nuclear Regulatory Commission. A similar insulator failure occurred at Unit 1 on February 29 again affecting the unit's startup transformers. In this case the breaker feeding the transformers tripped automatically and the emergency diesel generators immediately started up to restore power to the safety buses. Additionally, all of the non-safety power generation buses transferred to the unit auxiliary transformers, which receive power from the plant's turbine generator, preventing a trip of the plant. After this second failed insulator event, Exelon took both units offline and replaced all of the insulators in the plant's switchyard.

== Surrounding population ==
The Nuclear Regulatory Commission defines two emergency planning zones around nuclear power plants: a plume exposure pathway zone with a radius of 10 miles (16 km), concerned primarily with exposure to, and inhalation of, airborne radioactive contamination, and an ingestion pathway zone of about 50 miles (80 km), concerned primarily with ingestion of food and liquid contaminated by radioactivity.

The 2010 U.S. population within 10 miles (16 km) of Byron was 25,679, an increase of 5.9 percent in a decade, according to an analysis of U.S. Census data for msnbc.com. The 2010 U.S. population within 50 miles (80 km) was 1,273,771, an increase of 14.5 percent since 2000. Cities within 50 miles include Rockford (17 miles to city center).

== Security ==
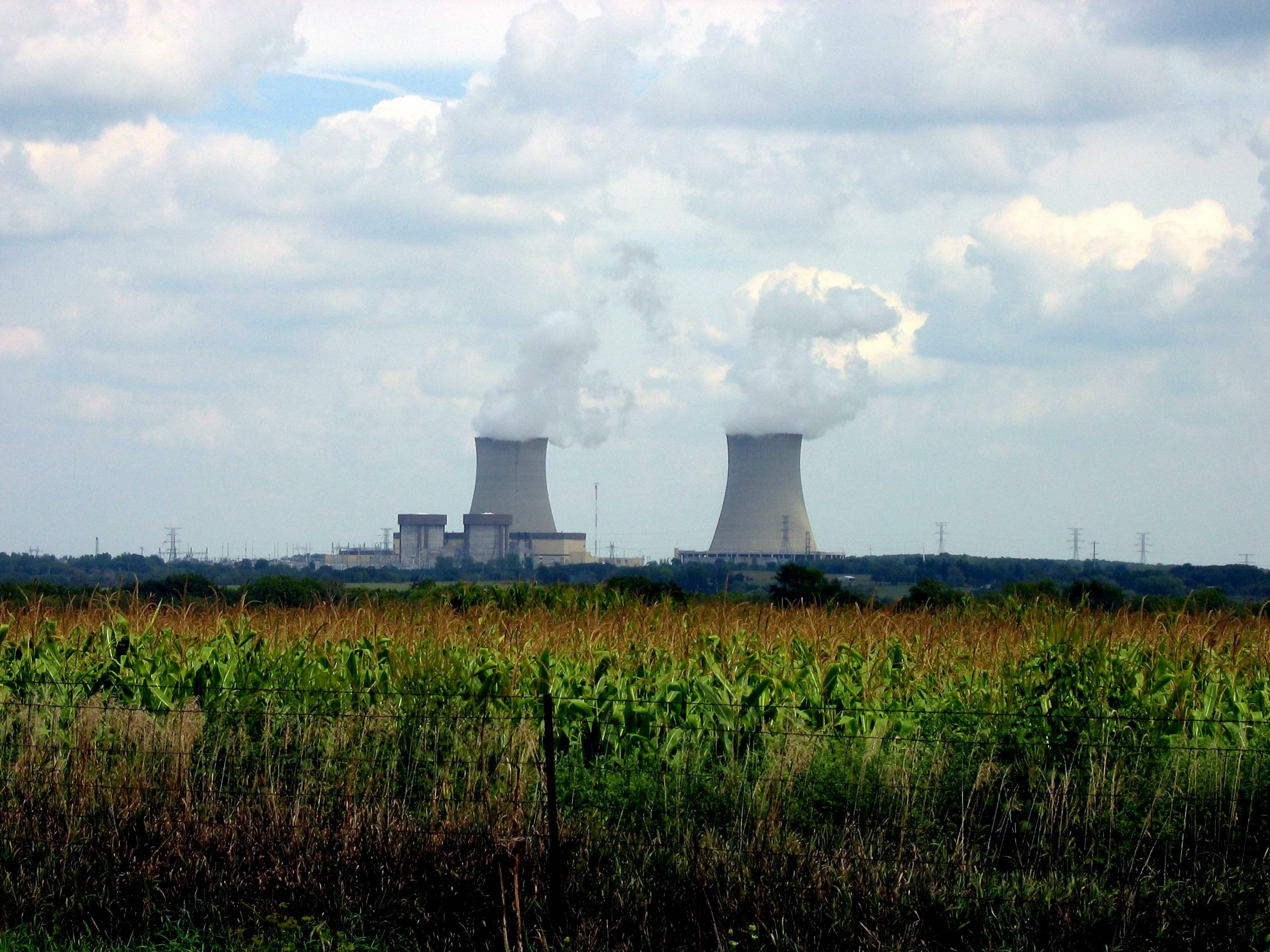
Byron Generating Station

Security at Byron was provided by The Wackenhut Corporation (now G4S Secure Solutions) until a story broke in late 2007 involving videotape that captured Wackenhut security guards asleep at the Peach Bottom Nuclear Generating Station in Pennsylvania. Security is now handled in-house by Exelon which owns and operates the power plant. After the attacks of September 11, 2001, a "security zone" was established by the United States Coast Guard around the Byron Clean Energy Center as part of a broader effort to secure nuclear facilities in the U.S. On December 10, 2004, the security zone at Byron was removed to allow for a security zone around the Hammond Intake Crib on Lake Michigan.

== Seismic risk ==
The Nuclear Regulatory Commission's estimate of the risk each year of an earthquake intense enough to cause core damage to the reactor at Byron was 1 in 172,414, according to an NRC study published in August 2010.

== See also ==
- Nuclear safety in the U.S.
- Nuclear accidents in the United States
- List of largest power stations in the United States
- Largest nuclear power plants in the United States
