= Baileyville =

Baileyville may refer to:

- Baileyville, Illinois
- Baileyville, Kansas
- Baileyville, Maine
