= Soldier's Monument (Byron, Illinois) =

- U.S. National Register of Historic Places
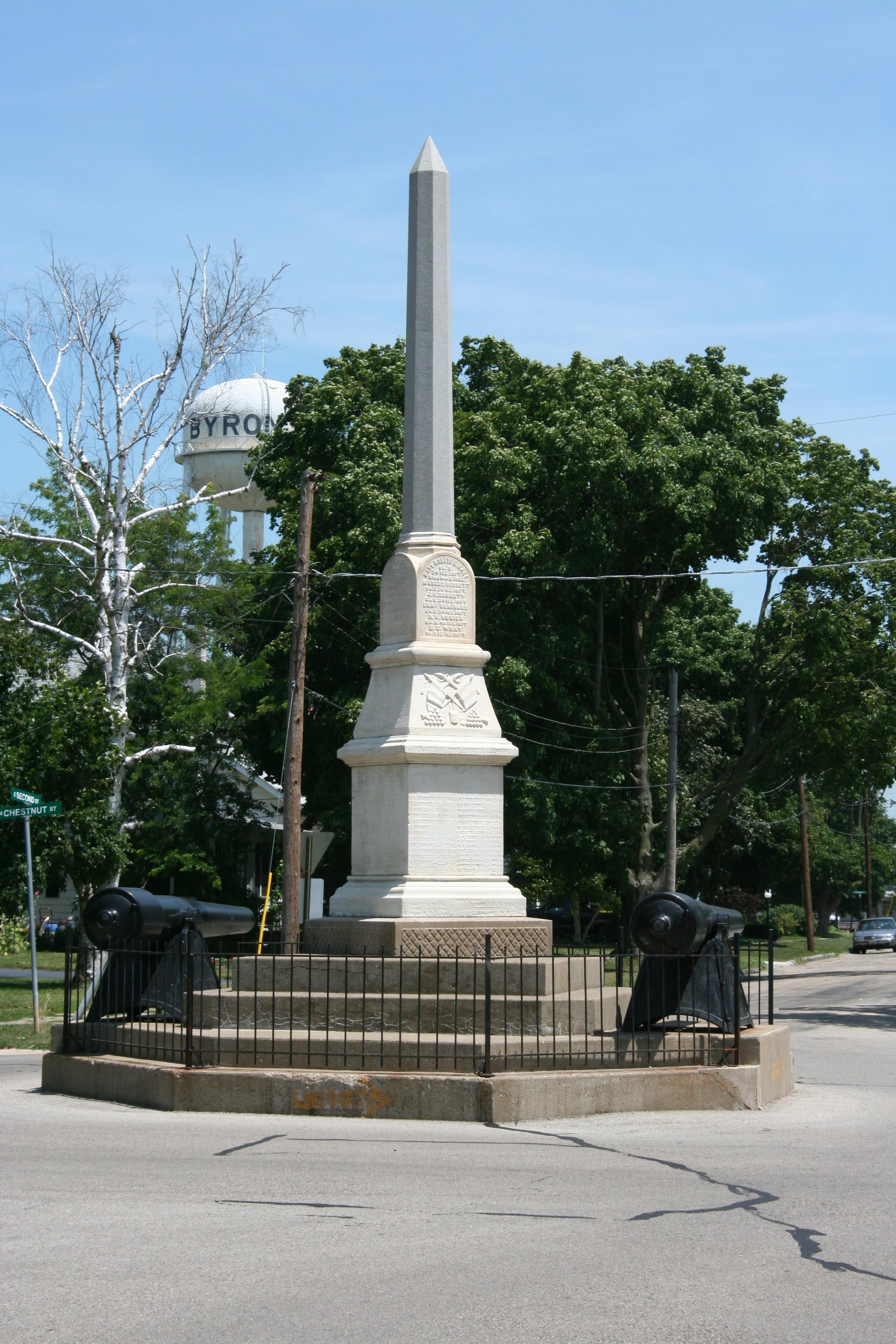
- The Soldier's Monument is placed directly in the middle of an intersection in Byron, Illinois.

- Location within Illinois Location within the United States
- Location: Chestnut and 2nd Sts., Byron, Illinois
- Coordinates: 42°7′38″N 89°15′39″W
- Area: less than one acre
- Built: 1866
- Architect: Heard and Lindsley (builders)
- NRHP reference No.: 85000268
- Added to NRHP: February 14, 1985

The Soldier's Monument in Byron, Illinois, is a listing on the National Register of Historic Places. Located in Ogle County, Illinois, the monument is the city of Byron's only National Register listing. This monument is the oldest still standing in Illinois, despite being struck by lightning and damaged by a tornado in 1918.

== Monument ==
The Soldier's Monument in Byron, Illinois is a marble spire located in the intersection of two streets. In the summer of 1865, shortly after the end of the Civil War, The Byron Monument Association was formed to erect a statue dedicated to the fallen soldiers. The Byron monument was one of the earliest in the state. The monument was erected in 1866 and constructed by builders Heard and Lindsley for $1,400. It is made of Rutland white marble. The monument was dedicated on October 16, 1866.

In 1877 the original spire was increased from 12 feet in height to 19 feet in height. Other alterations have taken place on the Soldier's Monument throughout the years. In 1897 the two cannons were added as was a cement base, two years later a lightning strike caused damage that had to be repaired. In 1918 the eagle atop the original spire was broken off in a tornado and in 1965 a new cement base was added. The original spire featured an eagle atop the point. After damage to the original spire and the first replacement, the decision was made to exclude the eagle (which significantly increased the cost of the spire) in the most recent replacement made.

== Significance ==
The Soldier's Monument was listed on the National Register of Historic Places on September 7, 1984 for its significant connection to social history.
