= Forreston, Illinois =

Forreston
- Village
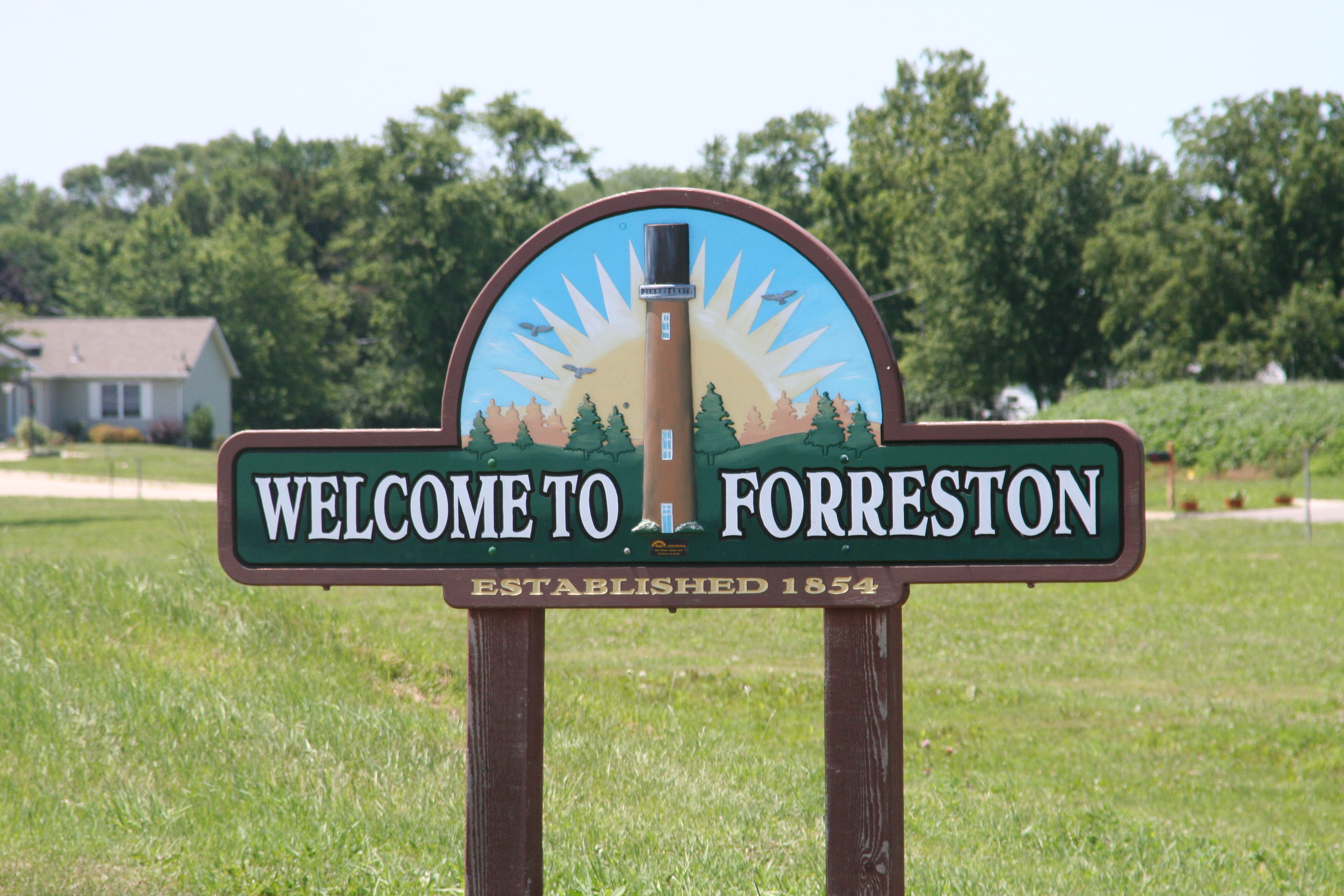
- Sign leading into Forreston

- Location of Forreston in Ogle County, Illinois.

- Location within Ogle County Forreston (Illinois)
- Coordinates: 42°07′27″N 89°34′41″W
- Country: United States
- State: Illinois
- County: Ogle
- Township: Forreston
- Established: 1854

Area
  - Total: 0.94 sq mi (2.44 km^{2})
  - Land: 0.94 sq mi (2.44 km^{2})
  - Water: 0 sq mi (0.00 km^{2})
- Elevation: 935 ft (285 m)

Population (2020)
  - Total: 1,435
  - Density: 1,521.0/sq mi (587.25/km^{2})
- Time zone: UTC-6 (CST)
  - Summer (DST): UTC-5 (CDT)
- Postal code: 61030
- Area code: 815
- FIPS code: 17-27065
- GNIS feature ID: 2398900
- Website: villageofforreston.org

Forreston is a village in Ogle County, Illinois, United States. As of the 2020 census, Forreston had a population of 1,435.

== History ==
Forreston was platted in 1854, and named for the forests near the original town site.

Brought on by the town's predominant population of German-ancestry, the annual "Sauerkraut Days" was a popular free-food festival held in the city limits of Forreston. Sauerkraut Days has recently been started up again, taking place in August with food and a car show.

== Geography ==
According to the 2010 census, Forreston has a total area of 0.9 square miles (2.33 km^{2}), all land. It is 100 miles west of Chicago.

== Demographics ==
Historical population
Census	Pop.	Note	%±
1880	1,108		—
1890	1,118		0.9%
1900	1,047		−6.4%
1910	870		−16.9%
1920	884		1.6%
1930	908		2.7%
1940	992		9.3%
1950	1,048		5.6%
1960	1,153		10.0%
1970	1,227		6.4%
1980	1,384		12.8%
1990	1,361		−1.7%
2000	1,469		7.9%
2010	1,446		−1.6%
2020	1,435		−0.8%
U.S. Decennial Census

=== 2020 census ===
As of the 2020 census, Forreston had a population of 1,435. The median age was 37.7 years. 25.1% of residents were under the age of 18 and 17.1% of residents were 65 years of age or older. For every 100 females there were 96.8 males, and for every 100 females age 18 and over there were 95.1 males age 18 and over.

0.0% of residents lived in urban areas, while 100.0% lived in rural areas.

There were 593 households in Forreston, of which 31.9% had children under the age of 18 living in them. Of all households, 50.4% were married-couple households, 16.7% were households with a male householder and no spouse or partner present, and 24.6% were households with a female householder and no spouse or partner present. About 29.7% of all households were made up of individuals and 10.9% had someone living alone who was 65 years of age or older.

There were 636 housing units, of which 6.8% were vacant. The homeowner vacancy rate was 1.6% and the rental vacancy rate was 6.8%.

Racial composition as of the 2020 census
Race	Number	Percent
White	1,350	94.1%
Black or African American	4	0.3%
American Indian and Alaska Native	1	0.1%
Asian	4	0.3%
Native Hawaiian and Other Pacific Islander	0	0.0%
Some other race	14	1.0%
Two or more races	62	4.3%
Hispanic or Latino (of any race)	38	2.6%

=== 2000 census ===
As of the census of 2000, there were 1,469 people, 594 households, and 414 families residing in the village. The population density was 1,767.4 inhabitants per square mile (682.4/km^{2}). There were 632 housing units at an average density of 760.4 per square mile (293.6/km^{2}). The racial makeup of the village was 99.25% White, 0.14% Native American, 0.20% Asian, 0.07% from other races, and 0.34% from two or more races. Hispanic or Latino of any race were 1.23% of the population.

There were 594 households, out of which 35.4% had children under the age of 18 living with them, 58.2% were married couples living together, 8.4% had a female householder with no husband present, and 30.3% were non-families. 26.4% of all households were made up of individuals, and 16.2% had someone living alone who was 65 years of age or older. The average household size was 2.47 and the average family size was 3.01.

In the village, the population was spread out, with 28.3% under the age of 18, 6.5% from 18 to 24, 28.5% from 25 to 44, 19.4% from 45 to 64, and 17.3% who were 65 years of age or older. The median age was 37 years. For every 100 females, there were 90.8 males. For every 100 females age 18 and over, there were 86.7 males.

The median income for a household in the village was $36,554, and the median income for a family was $44,853. Males had a median income of $35,463 versus $21,086 for females. The per capita income for the village was $16,958. About 7.4% of families and 9.6% of the population were below the poverty line, including 13.8% of those under age 18 and 9.2% of those age 65 or over.

== Education ==
Forreston is within the Forrestville Valley School District 221. The district operates Forreston Elementary, Middle, and High schools, as well as German Valley preschool and kindergarten.

== Gallery ==
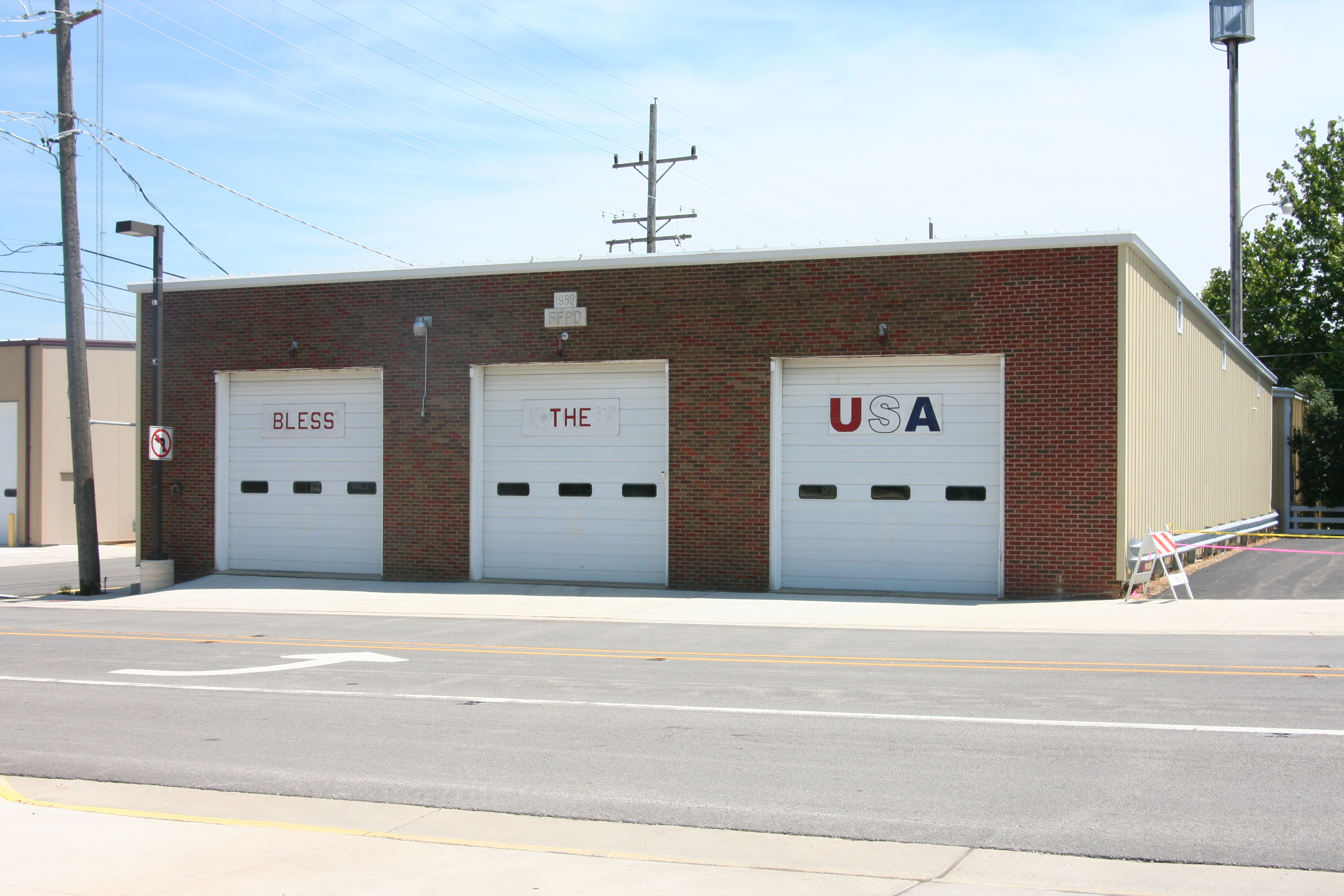
Old Forreston Fire Dept, 2007

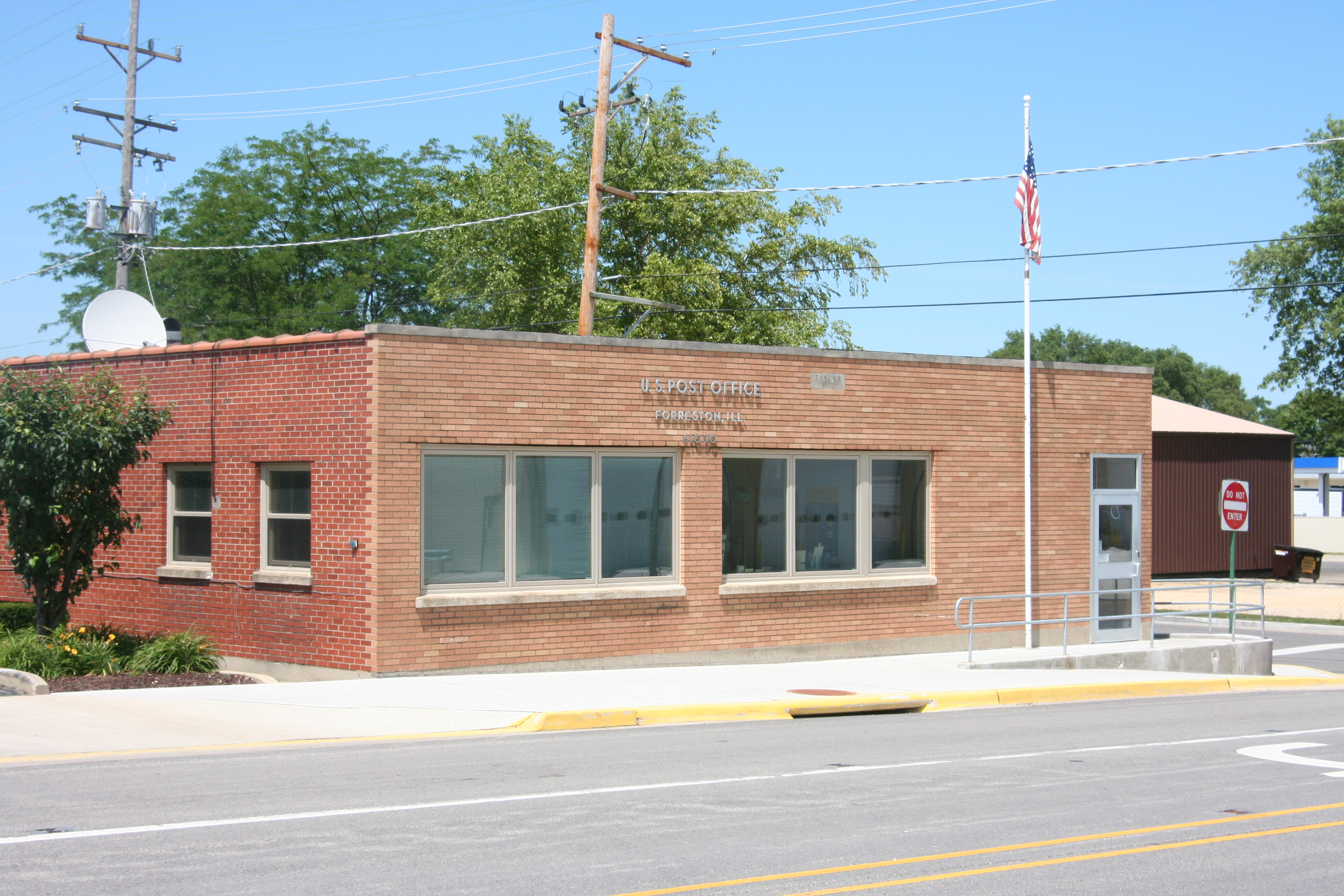
Post Office, 2007

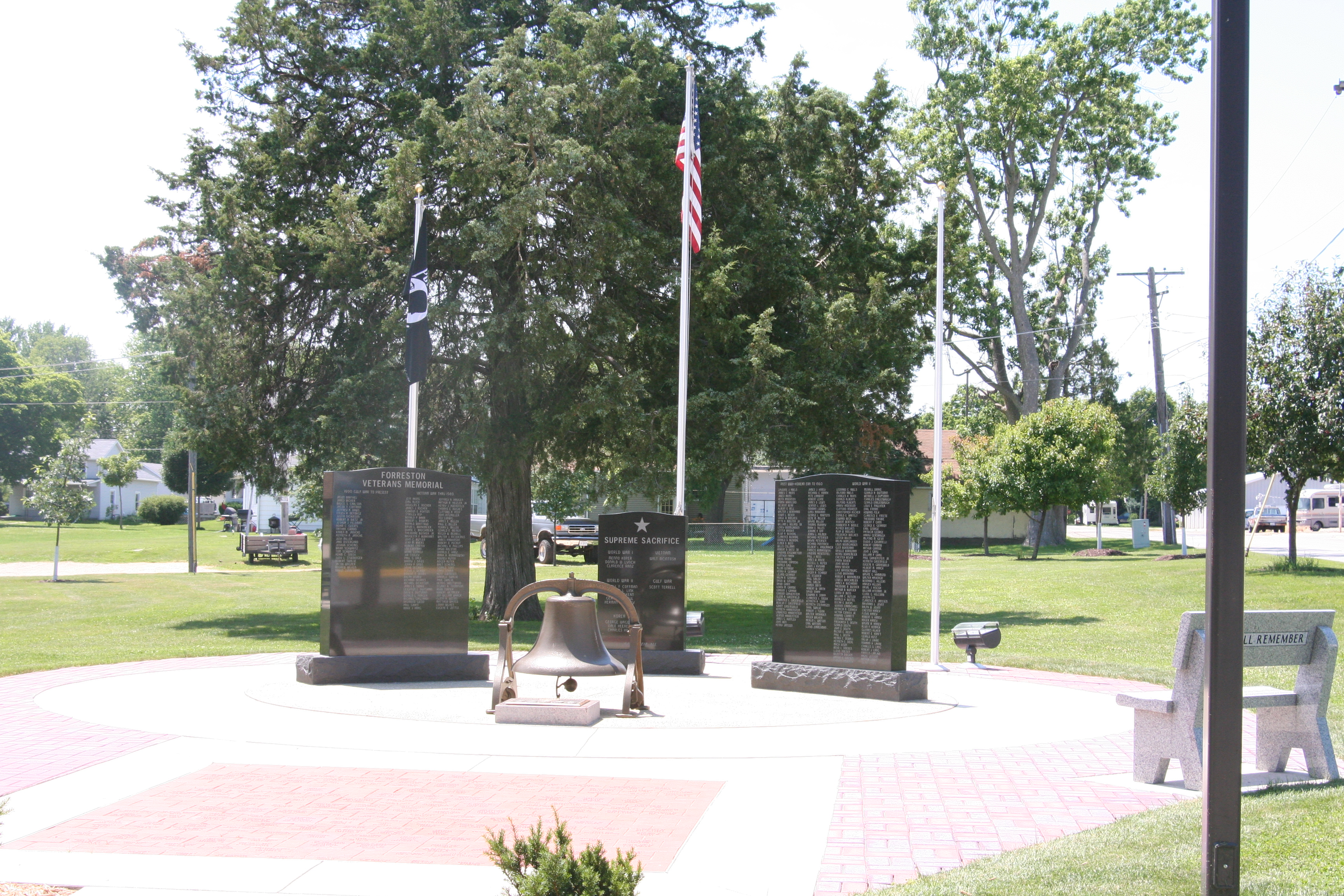
Veteran's Memorial, 2007

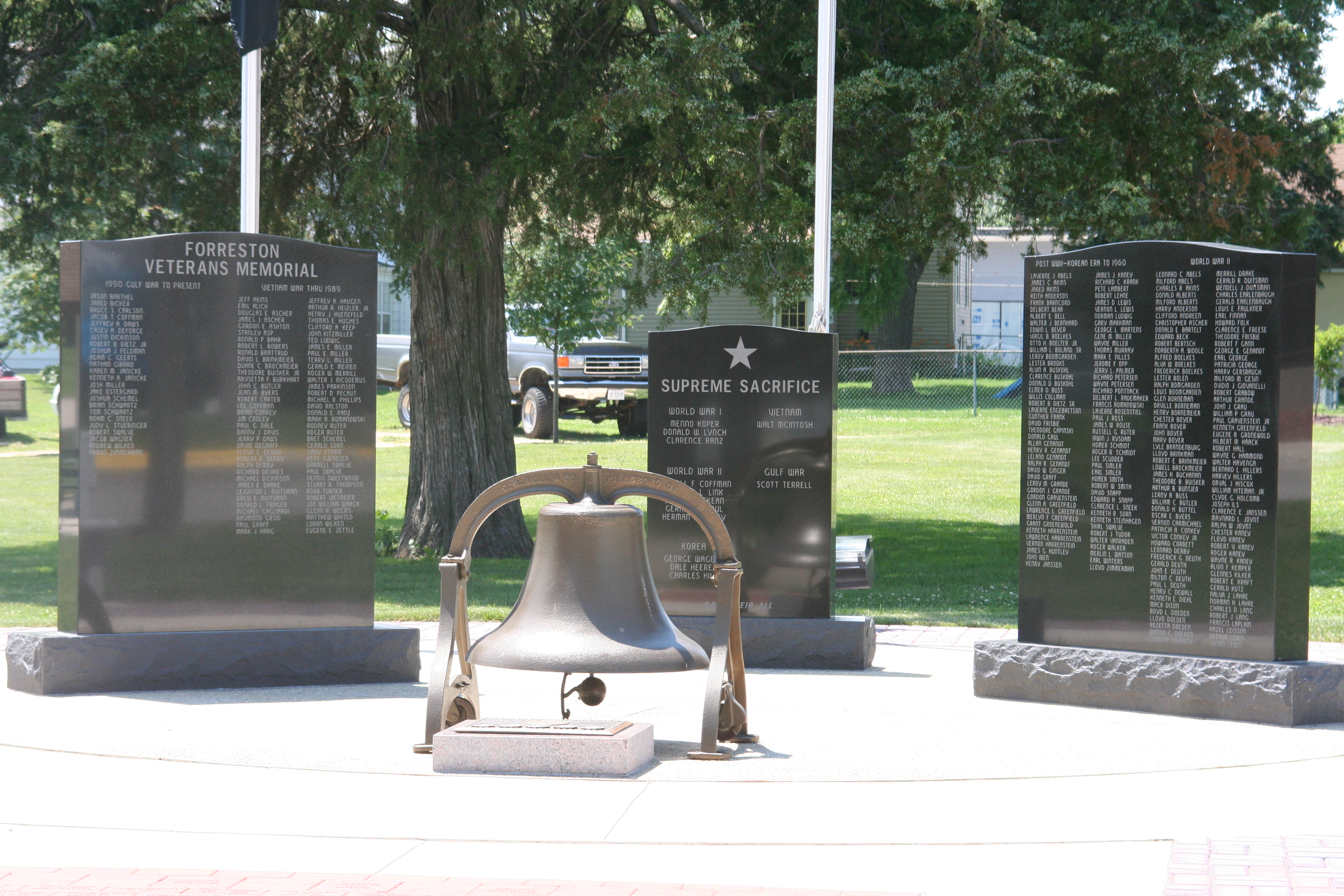
Veteran's Memorial, 2007
