= Braidwood Nuclear Generating Station =

Nuclear power station Illinois, U.S.

Braidwood Generating Station
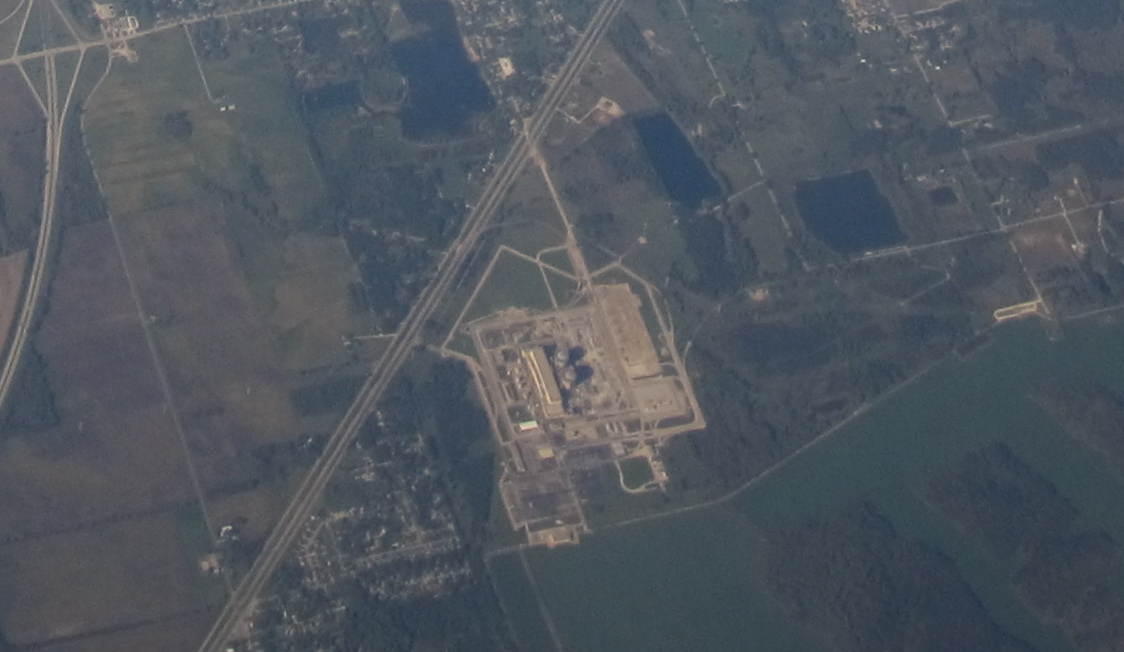
- Aerial image of Braidwood Nuclear Generating Station
- Country: United States
- Location: Reed Township, Will County, Illinois
- Coordinates: 41°14′37″N 88°13′45″W
- Status: Operational
- Construction began: August 1, 1975
- Commission date: Unit 1: July 29, 1987; Unit 2: October 17, 1988
- Construction cost: US$4.4 billion (1986) ($10.6 billion in 2024 dollars)
- Owner: Constellation Energy
- Operator: Constellation Energy
- Employees: 800

Nuclear power station
- Reactor type: PWR
- Reactor supplier: Westinghouse
- Cooling source: Braidwood Lake (Note: Braidwood Lake is an artificial lake whose levels are maintained by periodically pumping water from the nearby Kankakee River)
- Thermal capacity: 2 × 3686 MW_{th}

Power generation
- Units operational: 1 × 1194 MW; 1 × 1160 MW
- Make and model: WH 4-loop (DRYAMB)
- Nameplate capacity: 2386 MW
- Capacity factor: 93.1% (2021); 89.55% (lifetime)
- Annual net output: 19,474 GWh (2021)

External links
- Website: Braidwood Generating Station
- Commons: Related media on Commons

Braidwood Generating Station is located in Will County in northeastern Illinois, U.S. The nuclear power plant serves Chicago and northern Illinois with electricity. The plant was originally built by Commonwealth Edison company, and subsequently transferred to Com Ed's parent company, Exelon Corporation. Following Exelon's spin-off of their Generation company, the station was transferred to Constellation Energy.

This station has two Westinghouse pressurized water reactors. Unit #1 came online in July 1987. Unit #2 came online in May 1988. The units were licensed by the Nuclear Regulatory Commission to operate until 2026 and 2027, then granted extended licenses until 2046 and 2047. Each unit has received two power uprates during their lifetime, the first in May 2001 for 175.6 MWt and the second in February 2014 for 58.4 MWt.

The power uprates at Braidwood granted in 2001 make it the largest nuclear plant in the state, generating a net total of 2,386 megawatts. However the three largest Illinois nuclear power plants are nearly equal in generating capability as LaSalle County Nuclear Generating Station is only 2 MW less in capacity than Braidwood and Byron Nuclear Generating Station is only 4 MW less than LaSalle.

== Electricity production ==
Generation (MWh) of Braidwood Generating Station
| Year | Jan | Feb | Mar | Apr | May | Jun | Jul | Aug | Sep | Oct | Nov | Dec | Annual (Total) |
|---|---|---|---|---|---|---|---|---|---|---|---|---|---|
| 2001 | 1,727,831 | 1,552,470 | 1,728,556 | 1,656,495 | 1,639,129 | 1,692,442 | 1,695,033 | 1,694,293 | 1,365,275 | 1,791,768 | 1,403,693 | 1,778,667 | 19,725,652 |
| 2002 | 1,776,635 | 1,606,213 | 1,780,427 | 1,398,545 | 1,401,854 | 1,709,365 | 1,757,864 | 1,681,552 | 1,720,900 | 1,805,512 | 1,736,584 | 1,686,273 | 20,061,724 |
| 2003 | 1,816,256 | 1,640,320 | 1,802,294 | 1,238,127 | 1,751,854 | 1,734,721 | 1,781,398 | 1,776,654 | 1,735,685 | 1,795,175 | 1,251,200 | 1,703,248 | 20,026,932 |
| 2004 | 1,738,564 | 1,656,538 | 1,774,983 | 1,700,986 | 1,752,537 | 1,681,449 | 1,731,556 | 1,740,868 | 1,682,239 | 1,120,860 | 1,707,647 | 1,719,785 | 20,008,012 |
| 2005 | 1,766,686 | 1,600,815 | 1,671,600 | 1,271,881 | 1,611,456 | 1,678,960 | 1,719,344 | 1,722,304 | 1,497,776 | 1,766,153 | 1,714,922 | 1,774,486 | 19,796,383 |
| 2006 | 1,771,808 | 1,601,657 | 1,774,500 | 1,285,822 | 1,635,891 | 1,684,512 | 1,728,207 | 1,728,027 | 1,694,748 | 1,283,966 | 1,609,250 | 1,772,146 | 19,570,534 |
| 2007 | 1,776,321 | 1,603,492 | 1,766,825 | 1,714,126 | 1,748,069 | 1,613,663 | 1,731,300 | 1,639,632 | 1,669,428 | 960,189 | 1,662,661 | 1,772,143 | 19,657,849 |
| 2008 | 1,731,291 | 1,614,049 | 1,772,366 | 1,406,539 | 1,253,148 | 1,684,865 | 1,731,457 | 1,730,016 | 1,684,800 | 1,762,567 | 1,716,205 | 1,698,853 | 19,786,156 |
| 2009 | 1,773,707 | 1,601,852 | 1,703,629 | 1,066,241 | 1,752,417 | 1,681,940 | 1,708,525 | 1,604,232 | 1,684,125 | 1,191,320 | 1,685,359 | 1,774,630 | 19,227,977 |
| 2010 | 1,775,666 | 1,603,074 | 1,771,800 | 1,706,628 | 1,751,580 | 1,676,774 | 1,718,858 | 1,337,482 | 1,613,317 | 941,921 | 1,531,083 | 1,771,752 | 19,199,935 |
| 2011 | 1,773,967 | 1,602,025 | 1,769,725 | 1,335,527 | 1,337,621 | 1,670,148 | 1,681,029 | 1,708,345 | 1,677,370 | 1,752,582 | 1,707,585 | 1,761,103 | 19,777,027 |
| 2012 | 1,763,387 | 1,650,893 | 1,755,352 | 1,257,537 | 1,138,637 | 1,667,525 | 1,701,080 | 1,714,248 | 1,677,589 | 1,269,307 | 1,450,645 | 1,760,134 | 18,806,334 |
| 2013 | 1,758,895 | 1,591,601 | 1,757,169 | 1,701,870 | 1,736,436 | 1,584,370 | 1,577,738 | 1,714,573 | 1,037,402 | 1,734,598 | 1,705,258 | 1,762,065 | 19,661,975 |
| 2014 | 1,762,037 | 1,604,657 | 1,787,766 | 1,727,061 | 1,157,984 | 1,704,049 | 1,758,188 | 1,752,907 | 1,700,921 | 1,783,708 | 1,733,837 | 1,790,550 | 20,263,665 |
| 2015 | 1,790,116 | 1,616,252 | 1,708,243 | 1,190,005 | 1,775,399 | 1,706,635 | 1,745,967 | 1,756,624 | 1,694,698 | 1,208,233 | 1,731,106 | 1,786,733 | 19,710,011 |
| 2016 | 1,789,077 | 1,674,933 | 1,786,565 | 1,726,257 | 1,775,552 | 1,580,024 | 1,725,072 | 1,743,664 | 1,519,219 | 1,010,762 | 1,729,216 | 1,788,928 | 19,849,269 |
| 2017 | 1,788,994 | 1,615,460 | 1,785,899 | 1,458,880 | 1,186,574 | 1,687,165 | 1,744,669 | 1,752,523 | 1,625,618 | 1,773,757 | 1,734,093 | 1,789,922 | 19,943,554 |
| 2018 | 1,790,375 | 1,617,645 | 1,783,945 | 1,060,125 | 1,738,028 | 1,652,448 | 1,744,664 | 1,748,081 | 1,684,169 | 1,058,731 | 1,676,171 | 1,789,077 | 19,343,459 |
| 2019 | 1,788,805 | 1,616,748 | 1,786,313 | 1,725,411 | 1,775,688 | 1,705,590 | 1,713,430 | 1,735,984 | 1,610,607 | 1,271,291 | 1,732,484 | 1,788,789 | 20,251,140 |
| 2020 | 1,788,805 | 1,673,358 | 1,786,237 | 1,368,679 | 1,584,026 | 1,697,373 | 1,733,347 | 1,742,565 | 1,701,985 | 1,780,056 | 1,730,552 | 1,784,693 | 20,371,676 |
| 2021 | 1,786,312 | 1,613,598 | 1,759,852 | 1,105,601 | 1,761,009 | 1,647,573 | 1,740,232 | 1,736,255 | 1,688,411 | 1,284,508 | 1,564,316 | 1,786,680 | 19,474,347 |
| 2022 | 1,778,624 | 1,614,176 | 1,783,478 | 1,724,063 | 1,767,739 | 1,691,225 | 1,738,769 | 1,740,020 | 1,630,078 | 1,170,952 | 1,728,711 | 1,787,795 | 20,155,630 |
| 2023 | 1,786,471 | 1,613,815 | 1,782,559 | 1,429,487 | 1,372,505 | 1,689,637 | 1,728,909 | 1,733,311 | 1,693,358 | 1,769,820 | 1,727,770 | 1,785,954 | 20,113,596 |
| 2024 | 1,782,260 | 1,670,399 | 1,733,840 | 1,155,868 | 1,559,472 | 1,692,984 | 1,736,210 | 1,737,397 | 1,687,288 | 1,195,576 | 1,728,554 | 1,786,938 | 19,466,786 |
| 2025 | 1,786,745 | 1,613,885 | 1,782,838 | 1,723,318 | 1,771,871 | 1,691,180 | 1,680,259 | 1,728,101 | 1,673,809 | 1,200,198 | 1,727,602 | 1,785,568 | 20,165,374 |
| 2026 | 1,785,556 | 1,613,122 | 1,776,816 | 1,336,916 | 1,560,456 | 1,700,316 | 1,727,411 | 1,740,311 | | | | | -- |

== Surrounding population ==
The Nuclear Regulatory Commission defines two emergency planning zones around nuclear power plants: a plume exposure pathway zone with a radius of 10 miles (16 km), concerned primarily with exposure to, and inhalation of, airborne radioactive contamination, and an ingestion pathway zone of about 50 miles (80 km), concerned primarily with ingestion of food and liquid contaminated by radioactivity.

The 2010 U.S. population within 10 miles (16 km) of Braidwood was 33,910, an increase of 6.5 percent in a decade, according to an analysis of U.S. Census data for msnbc.com. The 2010 U.S. population within 50 miles (80 km) was 4,976,020, an increase of 5.3 percent since 2000. Cities within 50 miles include Joliet (20 miles to city center), as well as parts of both Aurora and Naperville (42 miles to city center).

== Tritium leaks ==
Exelon was sued by residents of Will County and by the state's attorney in 2006. The lawsuit alleges that the Braidwood plant released radioactive tritium into local water in violation of its permit. However, the US NRC has said the response is based on "emotion, not risk", and gone on record to state the tritium releases did not jeopardize human health or safety in any manner. The Illinois EPA also reported that all tests have confirmed releases are below the action levels of 20,000 picoCuries per liter, currently set by the EPA. However, Exelon agreed to provide bottled water to residents of Godley and to residents within 1500 feet of the blowdown line to the Kankakee River.

== Seismic risk ==
The Nuclear Regulatory Commission's estimate of the risk each year of an earthquake intense enough to cause core damage to the reactor at Braidwood was 1 in 136,986, according to an NRC study published in August 2010.

== See also ==
- List of largest power stations in the United States
- Largest nuclear power plants in the United States
