= Roseland Cemetery =

Cemetery in Monticello, Florida (est. 1845)

Coordinates: 30°32′59″N 83°52′03″W

Roseland Cemetery is in Monticello, Florida. It was established in 1845 and is one of three city owned cemeteries. Old City Cemetery was established in 1827 and Oakfield Cemetery in 1986. African Americans were buried at Old Union Cemetery.

The Florida archives include a photo of the Groom family's stone marker.

In 2022 a moonlight cemetery walk was held.

== Burials ==
- William Capers Bird, lawyer, planter, Confederate officer, and state legislator
- William Scott Dilworth, attorney, state legislator, delegate to Florida's secession convention, Confederate Army officer (commander of the 3rd Florida Infantry Regiment)
- Dannite Hill Mays, served in the Florida legislature and United States House of Representatives
- Samuel Pasco, Confederate soldier in the Civil War, president of Florida's 1885 Constitutional Convention, and U.S. Senator
- Ernest Ivy Thomas Jr., World War II soldier who helped raise the American flag at Iwo Jima
