= Baileyville, Illinois =

Baileyville
- Unincorporated; Census designated place
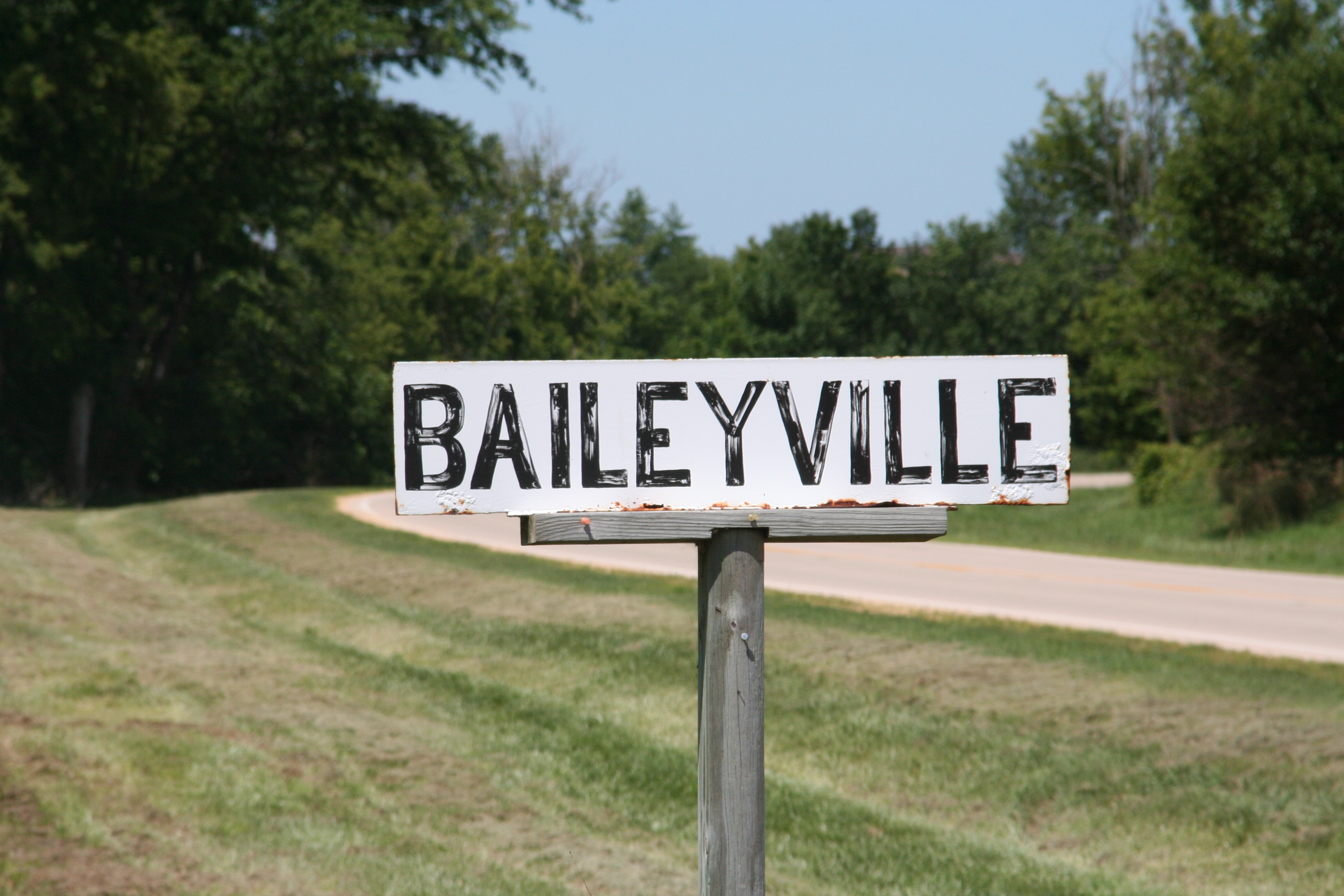
- Sign showing Baileyville, Illinois.

- Location within Ogle County Baileyville (Illinois)
- Coordinates: 42°11′50″N 89°35′36″W
- Country: United States
- State: Illinois
- County: Ogle
- Township: Forreston

Area
  - Total: 0.24 sq mi (0.63 km^{2})
  - Land: 0.24 sq mi (0.63 km^{2})
  - Water: 0 sq mi (0.00 km^{2})
- Elevation: 925 ft (282 m)

Population (2020)
  - Total: 187
  - Density: 773.4/sq mi (298.62/km^{2})
- Time zone: UTC-6 (CST)
  - Summer (DST): UTC-5 (CDT)
- ZIP Code: 61007
- Area codes: 779, 885
- FIPS code: 17-03337

Baileyville is an unincorporated community and census designated place (CDP) in Ogle County, Illinois, and is located west of Rockford. As of the 2020 census, Baileyville had a population of 187.

In 1818, the area of the present Village of Baileyville was inhabited by various Indian tribes; 3 years before the Blackhawk War in 1832, Thomas Crane built a log cabin about one half mile north of the current village, and a small settlement developed there called Cranes Grove, which included a stage coach stop, provided a change of horses and care for travelers headed for Galena and its lead mines; By 1853 the Illinois Central Railroad had completed a railroad line which ran about one half mile east of Cranes Grove Tavern and the settlement eventually shifted to the railroad to what is now the location of the Village of Baileyville; by 1852 three brothers from Vermont had arrived in14the area, Orville, Ransom, and Samuel Bailey, and decided to purchase land in the northwest area of Forreston Township on the northern most border of Ogle County; The brothers began to manufacture farm machinery and are credited with the building of the first self-binder called "The Morse Self Binder"; by 1855 the Illinois Central Railroad had completed the north–south line through Baileyville; M. H. Philbrick was appointed the first station agent, and soon built a store, a part of which became the Baileyville post office with Orville Bailey serving as the first postmaster; in 1858 the Village was formally plotted and laid out; The name of Cranes Grove was changed to Baileyville due to the active presence of the Bailey Brothers; by 1858 the village consisted of a hotel, two blacksmith shops, two physicians, a lumber yard, two creameries, a tailor, a harness maker, two taverns, a stockyard. a butcher, a grain8mill, two churches, and a two-story school house and had a population of about 200; Baileyville's two churches, the Baileyville Baptist Church and the Baileyville Reformed Church, have played and important part of the village's history; the Baptist Church was organized in 1856 at Diddens Schoolhouse; services were held there until 1874 when their first church building was erected in Baileyville; the Baileyville Reformed Church was organized on October 29, 1884; the newly organized church was able to purchase the already existing Methodist Church when the Methodist congregation decided to leave Baileyville; and east–west train lines were run through Freeport to the Village's north and through Forreston to the south, and the Village did not grow and was never incorporated. There is still a post office, some historic homes, and several businesses; it remains a good place to live, and a good place to raise family; The community was named after O. Bailey, a pioneer citizen.

== Demographics ==
Historical population
Census	Pop.	Note	%±
2020	187		—
U.S. Decennial Census

Baileyville first appeared as a census designated place in the 2020 U.S. census.

== Education ==
It is in the Forrestville Valley School District 221.

== Gallery ==
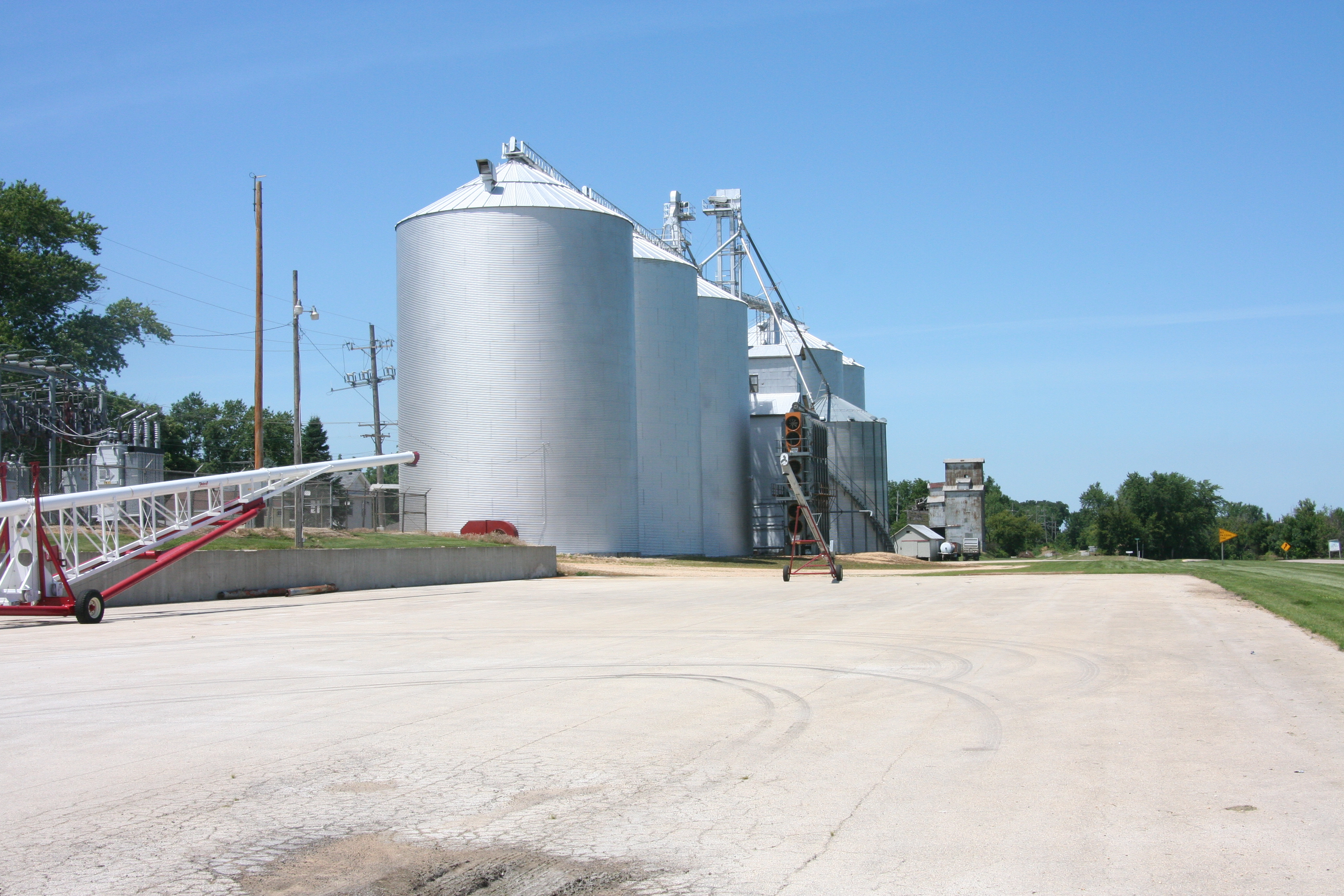
Grain elevators in Baileyville.

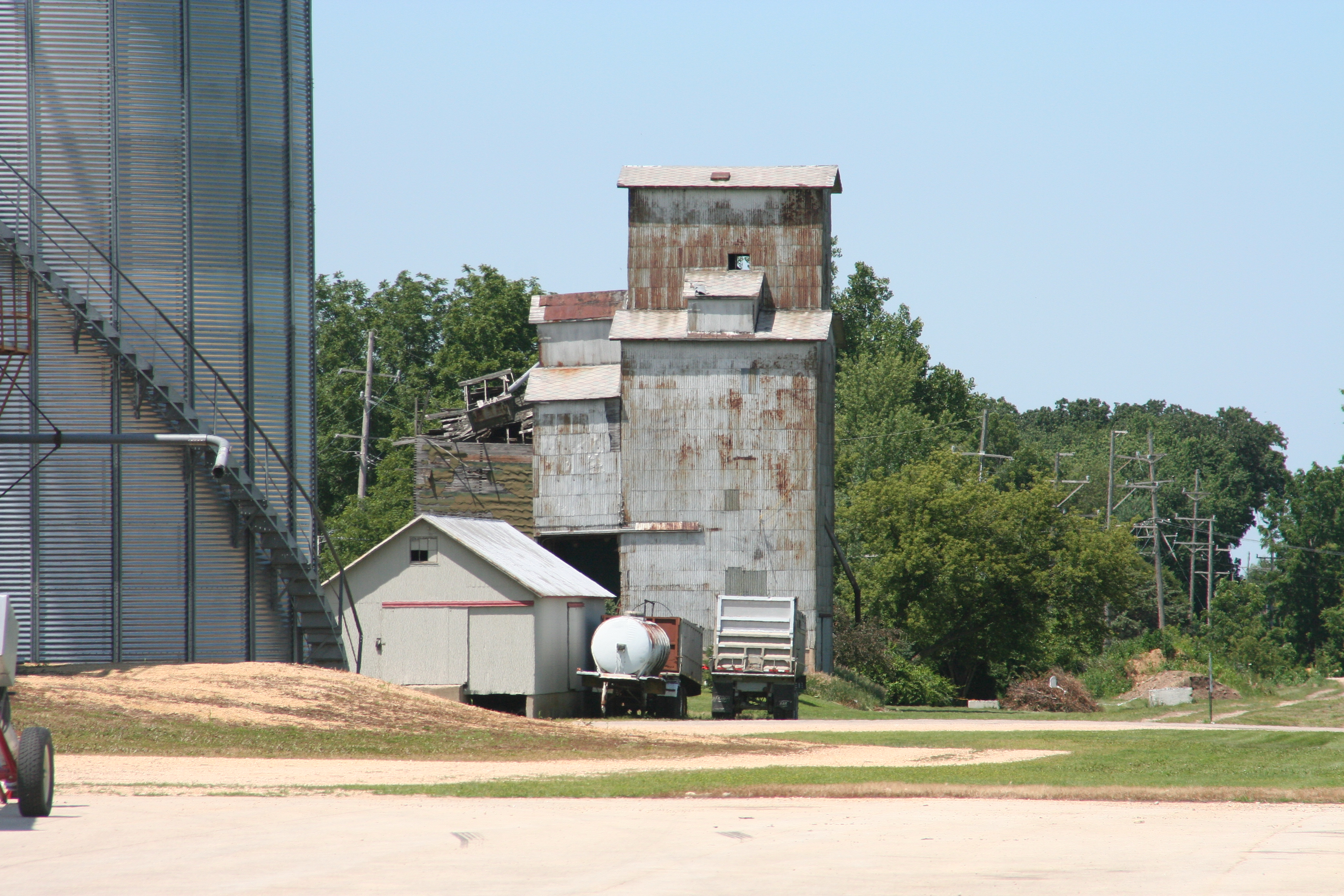
Older elevator in Baileyville.
