= Byron, Illinois =

Byron
- City
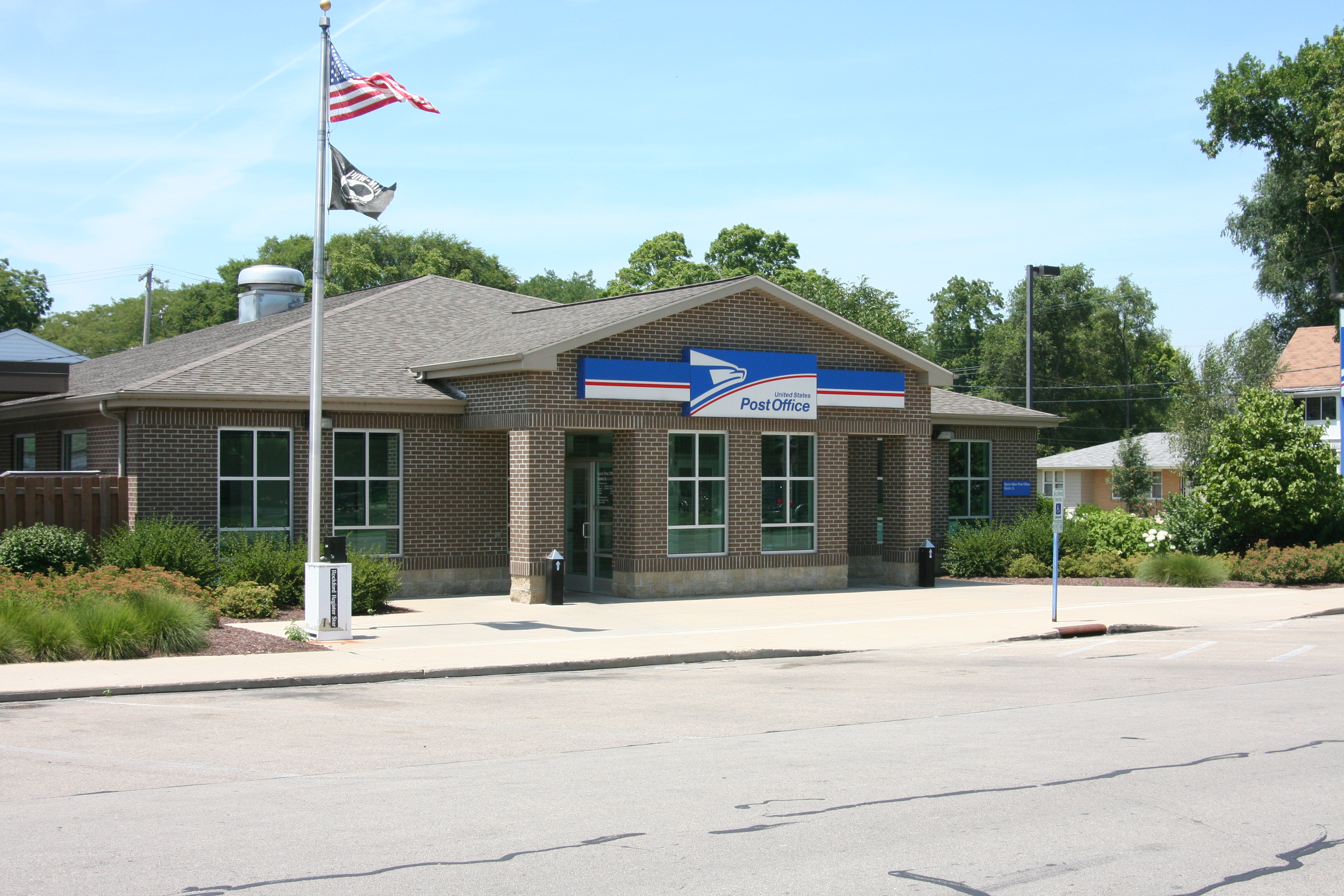
- Post Office in Byron.
- Motto: Gateway to the Rock River Valley.
- Location of Byron in Ogle County, Illinois
- Coordinates: 42°07′38″N 89°15′39″W
- Country: United States
- State: Illinois
- County: Ogle
- Township: Byron
- Founded: July 1835
- Incorporated town: 1878

Area
  - Total: 4.65 sq mi (12.05 km^{2})
  - Land: 4.65 sq mi (12.04 km^{2})
  - Water: 0 sq mi (0.00 km^{2})
- Elevation: 682 ft (208 m)

Population (2020)
  - Total: 3,784
  - Density: 813.9/sq mi (314.23/km^{2})
- Time zone: UTC-6 (CST)
  - Summer (DST): UTC-5 (CDT)
- ZIP code: 61010
- Area code: 815
- FIPS code: 17-10240
- GNIS feature ID: 2393487
- Website: www.cityofbyron.com

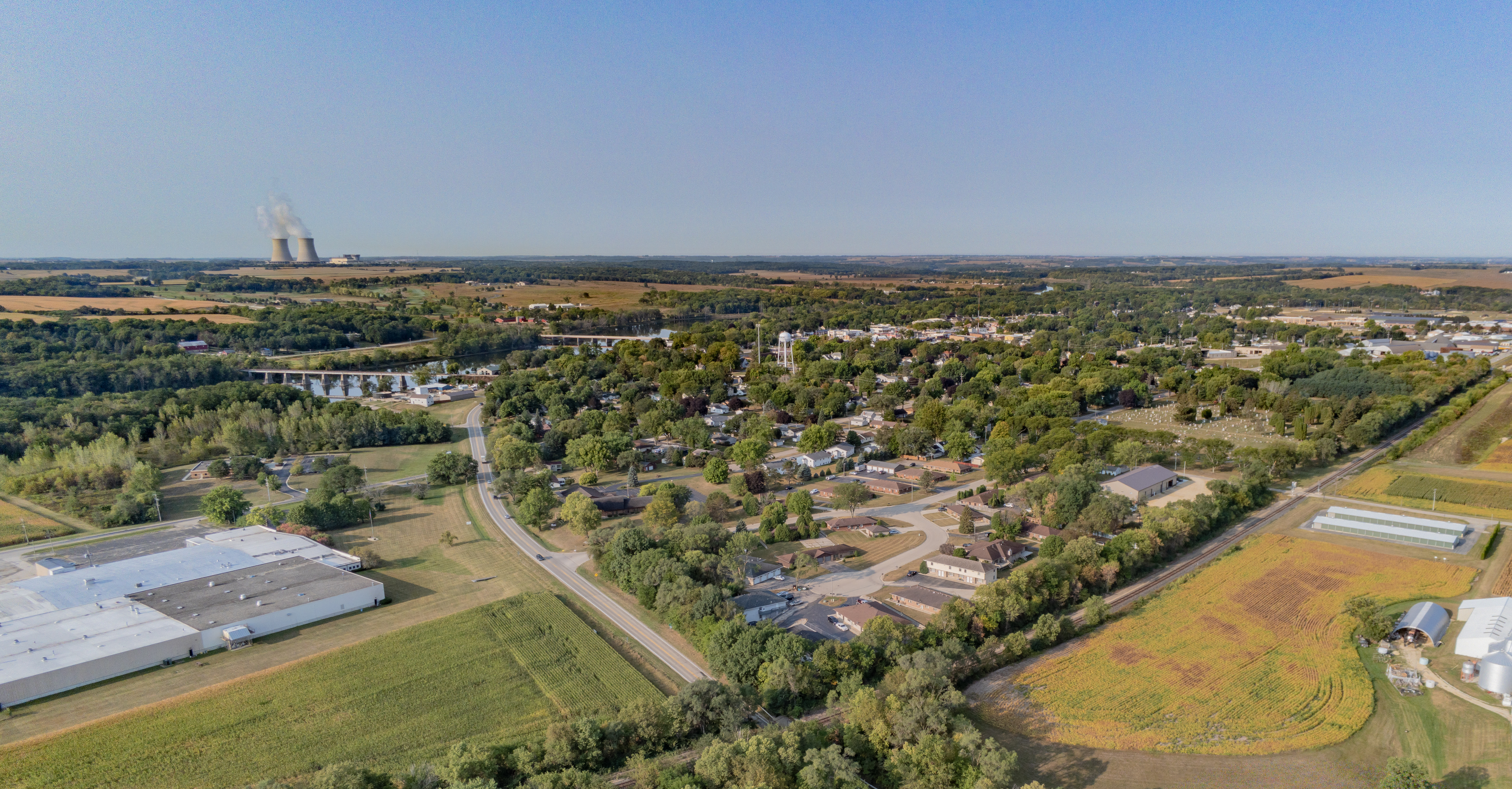
Aerial view of Byron in 2021

Byron is a city in Ogle County, Illinois, United States, probably best known as the location of the Byron Nuclear Generating Station, one of the last nuclear power plants commissioned in the United States. Byron is located in Byron Township, along the Rock River. As of the 2020 census, Byron had a population of 3,784. The town bills itself as the "Gateway to the Rock River Valley".

== History ==
The city that is now Byron was founded when a settler rode through the area on his way from Galena to Midway.

== Geography ==
Byron is located in Byron Township at the junction of Illinois Route 72 and Illinois Route 2. The Iowa, Chicago, and Eastern Railroad passes by the town.

Byron's topography includes a man-made prairie and the Rock River that passes through the town. It is generally flat and is ideal for farming in most regions. According to the 2010 census, Byron has a total area of 3.572 square miles (9.25 km^{2}), of which 3.57 square miles (9.25 km^{2}) (or 99.94%) is land and 0.002 square miles (0.01 km^{2}) (or 0.06%) is water.

== Demographics ==
Historical population
Census	Pop.	Note	%±
1890	698		—
1900	1,015		45.4%
1910	932		−8.2%
1920	855		−8.3%
1930	915		7.0%
1940	1,113		21.6%
1950	1,237		11.1%
1960	1,578		27.6%
1970	1,749		10.8%
1980	2,035		16.4%
1990	2,284		12.2%
2000	2,917		27.7%
2010	3,753		28.7%
2020	3,784		0.8%
U.S. Decennial Census

=== 2020 census ===
As of the 2020 census, Byron had a population of 3,784. The median age was 37.2 years. 26.9% of residents were under the age of 18 and 15.9% of residents were 65 years of age or older. For every 100 females there were 93.9 males, and for every 100 females age 18 and over there were 90.2 males age 18 and over.

94.8% of residents lived in urban areas, while 5.2% lived in rural areas.

There were 1,497 households in Byron, of which 35.3% had children under the age of 18 living in them. Of all households, 43.7% were married-couple households, 18.3% were households with a male householder and no spouse or partner present, and 29.5% were households with a female householder and no spouse or partner present. About 32.9% of all households were made up of individuals and 14.0% had someone living alone who was 65 years of age or older.

There were 1,591 housing units, of which 5.9% were vacant. The homeowner vacancy rate was 2.2% and the rental vacancy rate was 8.1%.

Racial composition as of the 2020 census
Race	Number	Percent
White	3,363	88.9%
Black or African American	45	1.2%
American Indian and Alaska Native	19	0.5%
Asian	15	0.4%
Native Hawaiian and Other Pacific Islander	0	0.0%
Some other race	46	1.2%
Two or more races	296	7.8%
Hispanic or Latino (of any race)	214	5.7%

=== 2000 census ===
As of the census of 2000, there were 2,917 people, 1,119 households, and 747 families residing in the city. The population density was 1,179.2 inhabitants per square mile (455.3/km^{2}). There were 1,166 housing units at an average density of 471.4 per square mile (182.0/km^{2}). The racial makeup of the city was 97.70% White, 0.41% African American, 0.14% Native American, 0.31% Asian, 0.31% from other races, and 1.13% from two or more races. Hispanic or Latino people of any race were 1.54% of the population.

There were 1,119 households, out of which 38.6% had children under the age of 18 living with them, 51.4% were married couples living together, 12.0% had a female householder with no husband present, and 33.2% were non-families. 28.8% of all households were made up of individuals, and 13.0% had someone living alone who was 65 years of age or older. The average household size was 2.53 and the average family size was 3.15.

In the city, the population was spread out, with 30.2% under the age of 18, 7.4% from 18 to 24, 30.2% from 25 to 44, 17.4% from 45 to 64, and 14.8% who were 65 years of age or older. The median age was 34 years. For every 100 females, there were 88.3 males. For every 100 females age 18 and over, there were 83.5 males.

The median income for a household in the city was $37,027, and the median income for a family was $46,250. Males had a median income of $40,568 versus $23,221 for females. The per capita income for the city was $17,164. About 6.9% of families and 7.8% of the population were below the poverty line, including 8.3% of those under age 18 and 7.5% of those age 65 or over.

== Economy ==
The Byron Nuclear Generating Station, currently owned by Constellation Energy, is just south of Byron. It began operations in 1985, after ten years of construction. The station provides a great deal of the electricity used in northern Illinois.

== Education ==
Byron is in the Byron Community Unit School District 226. There are three schools: Mary Morgan Elementary School, Byron Middle School, and Byron High School (pre-K-12) serving approximately 2,500 students. Byron High School placed fourth in the Illinois State Finals Academic Challenge in 2001.

Mary Morgan Elementary School was named an "Exemplary High Performing School" by the U.S. Department of Education's National Blue Ribbon Schools Program, awarded in 2017.

== Law and government ==
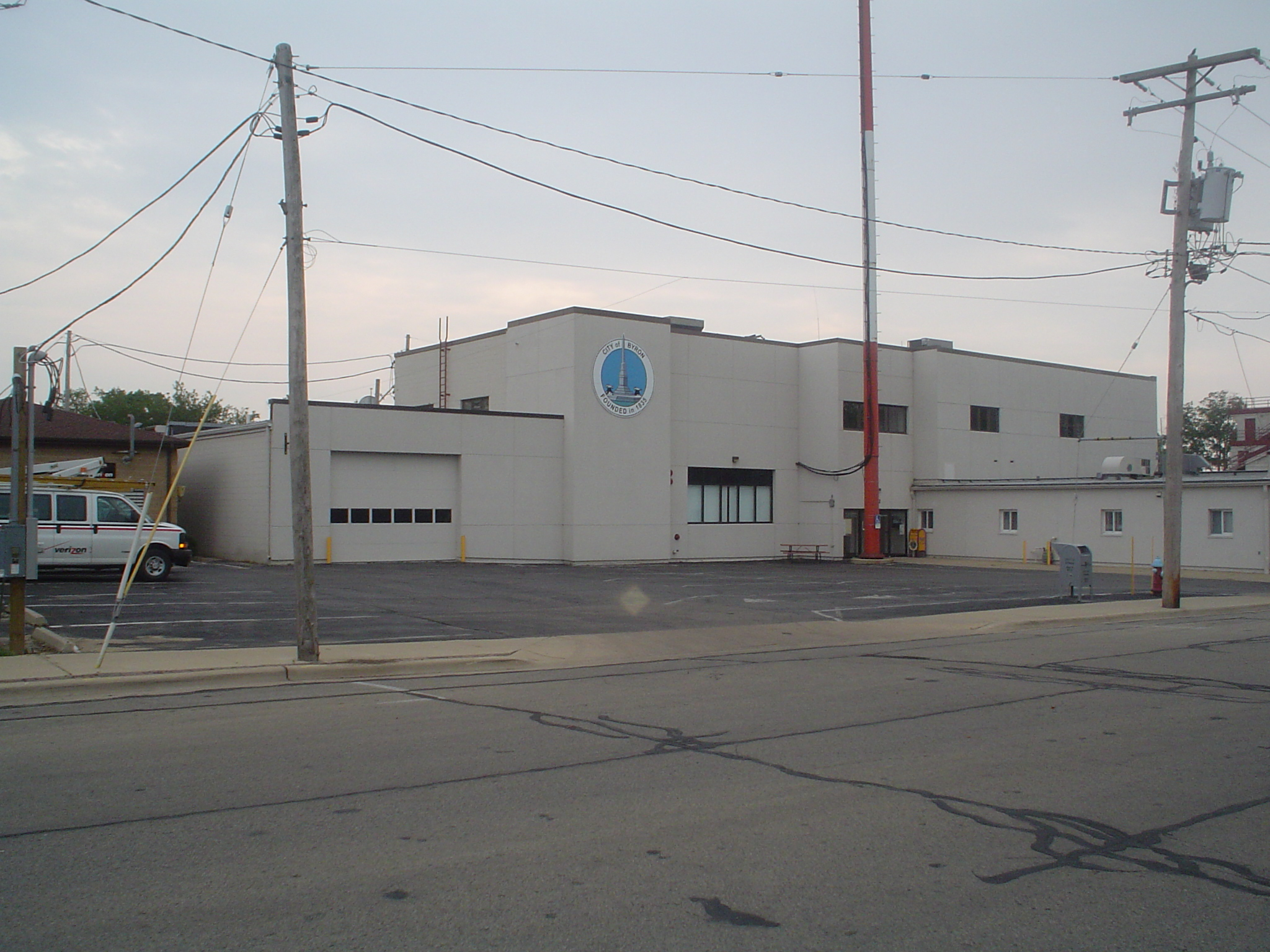
Byron City Hall

Byron is divided into four wards, each of which elects two aldermen, giving the city an eight-member council. The eight members of the council are organized into five committees with specific responsibilities, necessarily, given the number of council members, committee memberships overlap.

Elected separately, by the whole city, is the mayor. The mayor's powers include the right to appoint members of the five standing committees, and to preside over council meetings. He may also call special meetings of the council.

The city also has other elected officials, including a city clerk and a treasurer. There are also unelected paid positions; these are filled by appointment of the mayor. These include the comptroller and the city attorney.

Despite the fact that Byron has a mayor-council system of government, the municipal code for Byron contains a provision whereby a city administrator may be appointed, if the mayor and council so desire. To date, this provision has not been placed into effect.

== Festivals ==
- Turkey Testicle Festival is an annual tradition since 1979.
- ByronFest is a carnival held throughout downtown Byron, and other venues, each year in mid-July.

== Notable people ==
- Tom Billeter, men's basketball head coach for Augustana University since 2003
- Sean Considine, former safety in the National Football League.
- Troy Drake, offensive tackle with NFL's Philadelphia Eagles and Washington Redskins
- Wilson Irvine, painter
- Joseph Medill McCormick, congressman and senator
- Francis K. Newcomer, brigadier general in the United States Army
- Trisha Paytas, YouTuber, model, and singer
- Albert Goodwill Spalding, baseball player, co-founder of A.G. Spalding sporting goods company

== See also ==
- Soldier's Monument (Byron, Illinois)
