= Byron Township, Illinois =

Byron Township
- Township
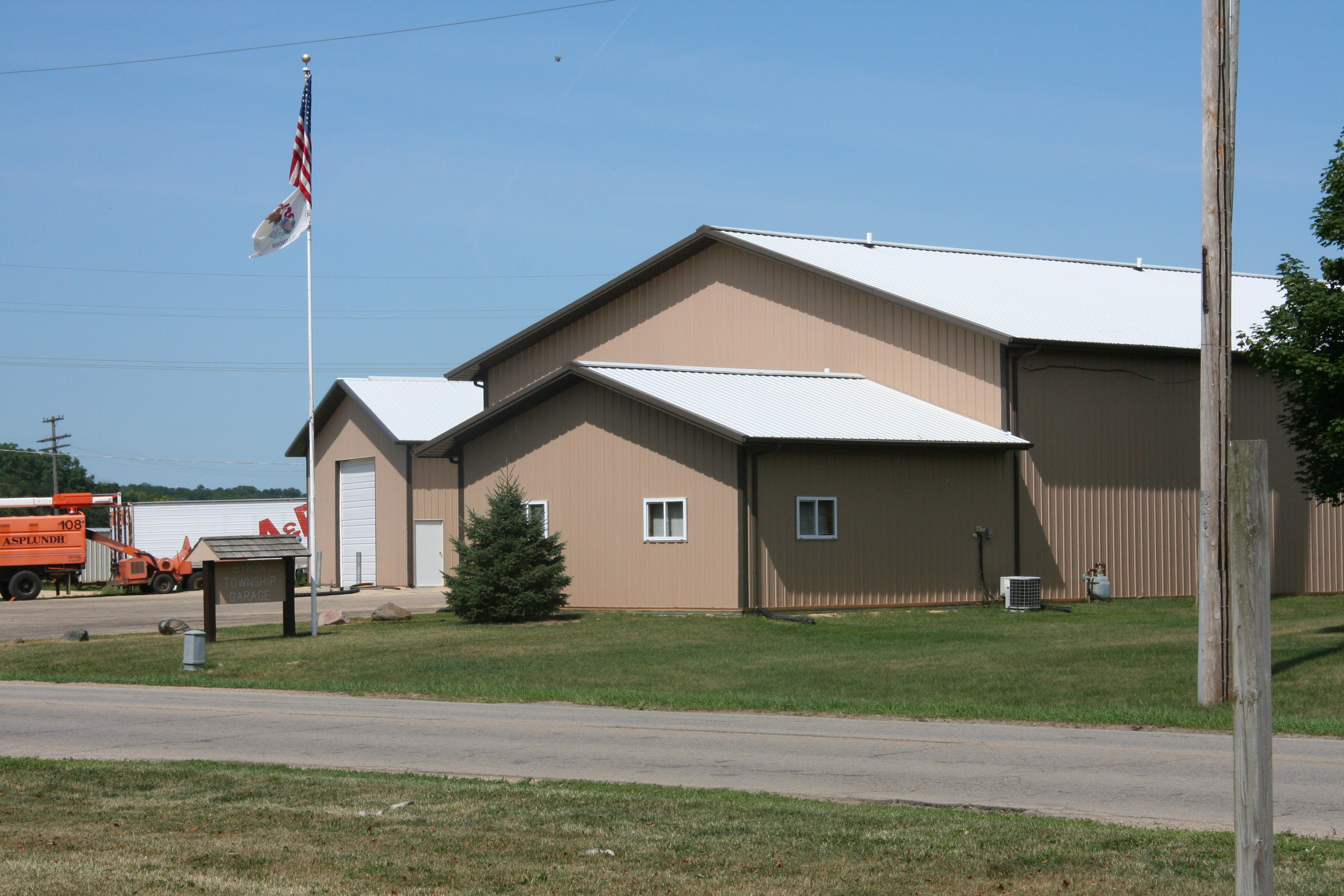
- Byron Township building in Byron, Illinois, USA.

- Location in Ogle County
- Coordinates: 42°10′10″N 89°16′29″W
- Country: United States
- State: Illinois
- County: Ogle
- Established: November 6, 1849

Government
  - Supervisor: David Burnworth

Area
  - Total: 37.24 sq mi (96.5 km^{2})
  - Land: 36.68 sq mi (95.0 km^{2})
  - Water: 0.56 sq mi (1.5 km^{2}) 1.50%
- Elevation: 732 ft (223 m)

Population (2010)
  - Estimate (2016): 6,336
  - Density: 178.9/sq mi (69.1/km^{2})
- Time zone: UTC-6 (CST)
  - Summer (DST): UTC-5 (CDT)
- ZIP codes: 61010, 61047, 61061, 61102
- FIPS code: 17-141-10253
- Website: byrontownshipil.org

Byron Township is one of twenty-four townships in Ogle County, Illinois, USA. As of the 2010 census, its population was 6,563 and it contained 2,594 housing units.

== Geography ==
According to the 2010 census, the township has a total area of 37.24 square miles (96.5 km^{2}), of which 36.68 square miles (95.0 km^{2}) (or 98.50%) is land and 0.56 square miles (1.5 km^{2}) (or 1.50%) is water. It contains the north three-quarters of the city of Byron.

=== Cemeteries ===
The township contains these two cemeteries: Byron City and Saint Mary's.

== Demographics ==
Historical population
Census	Pop.	Note	%±
2016 (est.)	6,336
U.S. Decennial Census

== School districts ==
- Byron Community Unit School District 226

== Political districts ==
- Illinois's 16th congressional district
- State House District 89
- State Senate District 45
