= Forreston Township, Illinois =

Forreston Township
- Township
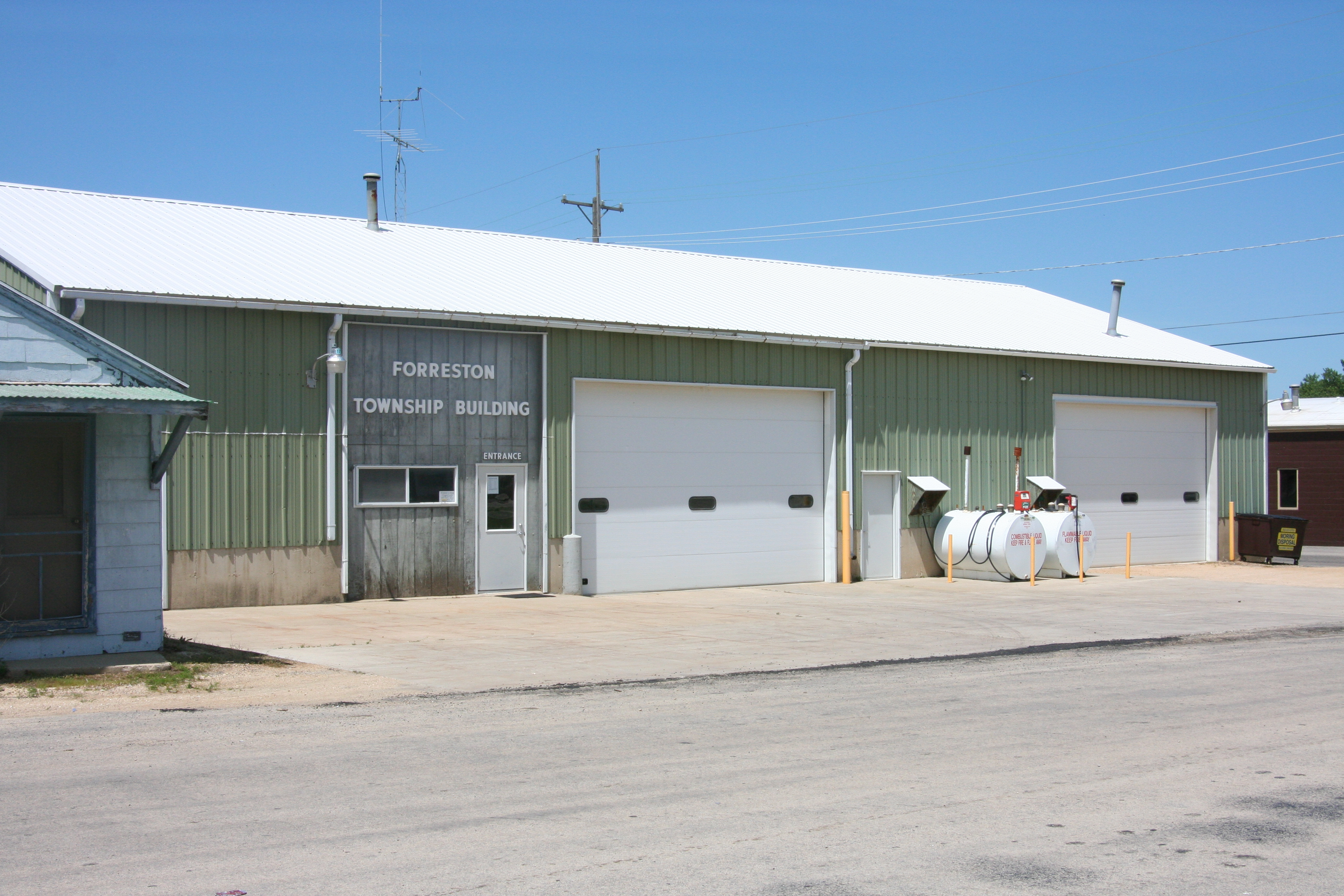
- Forreston Township Building in Forreston, Illinois.

- Location of Illinois in the United States
- Coordinates: 42°07′44″N 89°34′46″W
- Country: United States
- State: Illinois
- County: Ogle
- Settled: March 4, 1857

Government
  - Mayor: Jim Miller

Area
  - Total: 36.36 sq mi (94.2 km^{2})
  - Land: 36.34 sq mi (94.1 km^{2})
  - Water: 0.02 sq mi (0.052 km^{2})
- Elevation: 902 ft (275 m)

Population (2010)
  - Estimate (2016): 1,974
  - Density: 57.2/sq mi (22.1/km^{2})
- Time zone: UTC-6 (CST)
  - Summer (DST): UTC-5 (CDT)
- FIPS code: 17-141-27078

Forreston Township is located in Ogle County, Illinois. As of the 2010 census, its population was 2,080 and it contained 885 housing units. Forreston Township was formed from a portion of Brookville Township on March 4, 1857. The village of Forreston and the unincorporated community of Baileyville are located within it.

== Geography ==
According to the 2010 census, the township has a total area of 36.36 square miles (94.2 km^{2}), of which 36.34 square miles (94.1 km^{2}) (or 99.94%) is land and 0.02 square miles (0.052 km^{2}) (or 0.06%) is water.

== Demographics ==
Historical population
Census	Pop.	Note	%±
2016 (est.)	1,974
U.S. Decennial Census
