= Rockvale Township, Illinois =

Rockvale Township
- Township
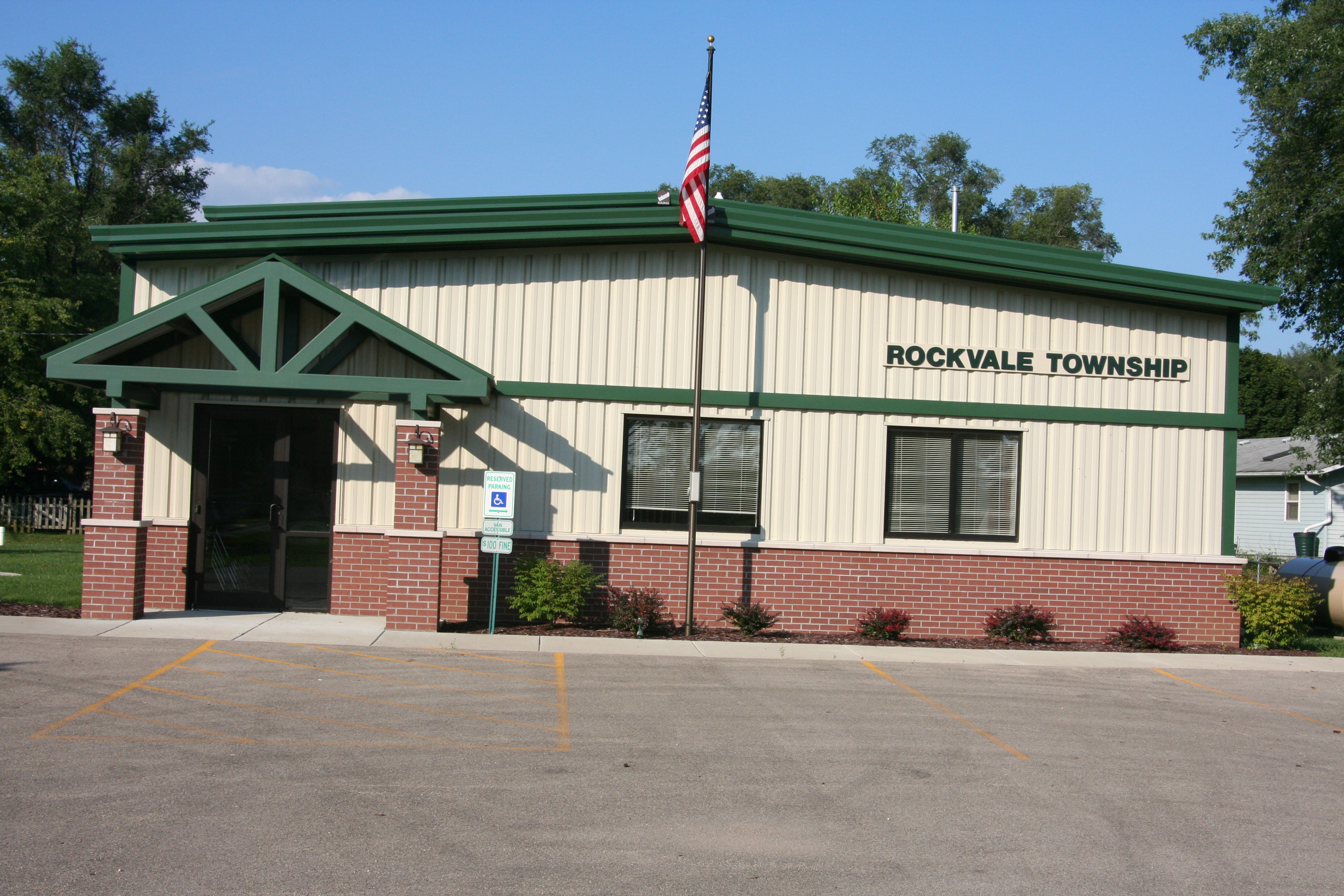
- Town hall

- Location of Illinois in the United States
- Coordinates: 42°06′03″N 89°18′58″W
- Country: United States
- State: Illinois
- County: Ogle
- Settled: November 6, 1849

Government
  - Mayor: Jeff Tremble

Area
  - Total: 35.64 sq mi (92.3 km^{2})
  - Land: 34.76 sq mi (90.0 km^{2})
  - Water: 0.88 sq mi (2.3 km^{2})
- Elevation: 748 ft (228 m)

Population (2010)
  - Estimate (2016): 1,705
  - Density: 50.9/sq mi (19.7/km^{2})
- Time zone: UTC-6 (CST)
  - Summer (DST): UTC-5 (CDT)
- FIPS code: 17-141-65182

Rockvale Township is located in Ogle County, Illinois. As of the 2010 census, its population was 1,770 and it contained 804 housing units.

== History ==
Rockvale Township was originally named Brooklyn Township, but changed its name on November 12, 1850.

== Geography ==
According to the 2010 census, the township has a total area of 35.64 square miles (92.3 km^{2}), of which 34.76 square miles (90.0 km^{2}) (or 97.53%) is land and 0.88 square miles (2.3 km^{2}) (or 2.47%) is water.

== Demographics ==
Historical population
Census	Pop.	Note	%±
2016 (est.)	1,705
U.S. Decennial Census
