= Brookville =

Brookville may refer to any of the following:

== Places ==
=== United States ===
- Brookville, Illinois, an unincorporated community
- Brookville, Indiana, a town
- Brookville, Kansas, a city
- Brookville, Michigan, an unincorporated community
- Brookville, Hunterdon County, New Jersey, an unincorporated community
- Brookville, Ocean County, New Jersey, an unincorporated community
- Brookville, New York, a village
- Brookville, Ohio, a city
- Brookville, Pennsylvania, a borough
- Brookville Township (disambiguation), several places

=== Canada ===
- Brookville, Nova Scotia, a rural village
- Brookville, Ontario, an unincorporated community

=== Australia ===
- the former name of Brooklyn, Tasmania, a locality

== Other uses ==
- Brookville Locomotive Company, manufacturer of railroad locomotives starting in 1918
- Brookville (band), a pop-band / solo-project of Andy Chase from the band Ivy

== See also ==
- Brookville High School (disambiguation)
- Brooksville (disambiguation)
- Brookeville, Maryland
