= List of battery operated trams =

This is a list of rail based trams, streetcars and light rail transit systems that use batteries or supercapacitors and run catenary-free as part of their regular operation.

== Africa ==
Location	Name of System	Vehicles	System Distance	Battery Distance	Notes

== Asia ==
Location	Name of System	Vehicles	System Distance	Battery Distance	Notes
Kaohsiung	Circular light rail	CAF Urbos, Citadis 305	13.7 mi (22.0 km)	13.7 mi (22.0 km)	
Nanjing	Nanjing Trams	Flexity 2	5.6 mi (9 km)		Charging is at stations (46 s) and endpoints (10 min)
Seoul	Wirye Line	Hyundai Rotem and Woojin Industrial Systems	3.38 mi (5.44 km)	3.38 mi (5.44 km)	In testing, batteries and fuel cells

== Europe ==
Location	Name of System	Vehicles	System Distance	Battery Distance	Notes
Barcelona	Trambesòs	Citadis 302	8.7 mi (14.0 km)		
Basel	Trams in Basel		79.8 mi (128.4 km)		
Birmingham	West Midlands Metro	CAF Urbos 3	14.9 mi (24.0 km)		
Blackpool	Blackpool Tramway		11.2 mi (18.0 km)		
Bordeaux	Bordeaux Tramway		48 mi (77 km)		
Eskişehir	EsTram	Škoda ForCity	34 mi (55 km)		
Florence	Trams in Florence		12 mi (19 km)		
Konya	Konya Tram	Škoda ForCity 28T	16.9 mi (27.2 km)	1.1 mi (1.8 km)	
Luxembourg	Trams in Luxembourg City	CAF Urbos 100	9.9 mi (15.9 km)	2.2 mi (3.5 km)	
Nice	Nice tramway	Citadis 405	17.1 mi (27.5 km)	Line 1: 0.6 mi (0.97 km)	Line 1 uses batteries. Line 2/3 make use of Ground-level power supply and supercapacitors
Mannheim	Trams in Mannheim/Ludwigshafen		38 mi (61 km)		
Marseille	Marseille tramway	CAF Urbos 100X	11.9 mi (19.2 km)		Vehicles delivered, not clear if any track is wireless yet
Seville	MetroCentro	CAF Urbos 3	2.2 mi (3.5 km)		
Timișoara	STPT (transport operator)	Bozankaya	24 mi (39 km)		Vehicles delivered, not clear if any track is wireless yet

== North America ==
Location	Name of System	Vehicles	System Distance	Battery Distance	Notes
Charlotte	CityLynx Gold Line	Siemens S700	4 mi (6.4 km)	1.5 mi (2.4 km)	
Dallas	Dallas Streetcar	Brookville Liberty Modern Streetcar	2.45 mi (3.94 km)	1.1 mi (1.8 km)	Over the Houston Street Viaduct
Detroit	QLine	Brookville Liberty Modern Streetcar	3.3 mi (5.3 km)	1.98 mi (3.19 km)	
Milwaukee	The Hop	Brookville Liberty Modern Streetcar	M-Line: 2.1 mi (3.4 km) L-Line: 2 mi (3.2 km)	M-Line: 3,300 ft (1.0 km) L-Line: 3,800 ft (1.2 km)	
Oklahoma City	Oklahoma City Streetcar	Brookville Liberty Modern Streetcar	5.6 mi (9.0 km)	Several hundred feet	Under the Burlington Northern Santa Fe Railway bridges
Phoenix	S Line	Brookville Liberty Modern Streetcar	3 mi (4.8 km)	1 mi (1.6 km)	Historic downtown of Tempe
Seattle	First Hill Streetcar	Inekon 121 Trio	2.5 mi (4.0 km)	2.5 mi (4.0 km)	Broadway/South Jackson St - conflict with trollybus wire, runs up-hill on wire, down-hill on battery

== South America ==
Location	Name of System	Vehicles	System Distance	Battery Distance	Notes
Rio de Janeiro	Rio de Janeiro Light Rail	Citadis 402	17 mi (27 km)	3.4 mi (5.5 km)	Uses Ground-level power supply instead of catenary
Santos	Baixada Santista Light Rail	Tramlink			

== Oceania ==
Location	Name of System	Vehicles	System Distance	Battery Distance	Notes
Canberra	Light rail in Canberra	CAF Urbos 3	7.5 mi (12.1 km)	0 mi (0 km)	Existing vehicles are in process of being retrofitted with batteries, 1.7 mi (2.7 km) extension to open in 2028 (wire-free)
Newcastle	Newcastle Light Rail	CAF Urbos 100	1.7 mi (2.7 km)	1.7 mi (2.7 km)	Supercapacitor
