= Brooksville =

Brooksville is the name of several places in the United States:

- Brooksville, Blount County, Alabama
- Brooksville, Morgan County, Alabama
- Brooksville, Florida
  - Brooksville Army Airfield, named after the Florida town
- Brooksville, Georgia
- Brooksville, Kentucky
  - Brooksville Independent-Graded School District, named after the Kentucky town
- Brooksville, Maine
- Brooksville, Mississippi
- Brooksville, Oklahoma
- Brooksville, West Virginia, an unincorporated community also known as Bigbend, West Virginia

== See also ==
- Brookville (disambiguation)
- Brooksville Advent Church, named after the village of Brooksville in New Haven, Vermont
