= AmeriTram =

Japanese-designed American streetcar

ameriTRAM
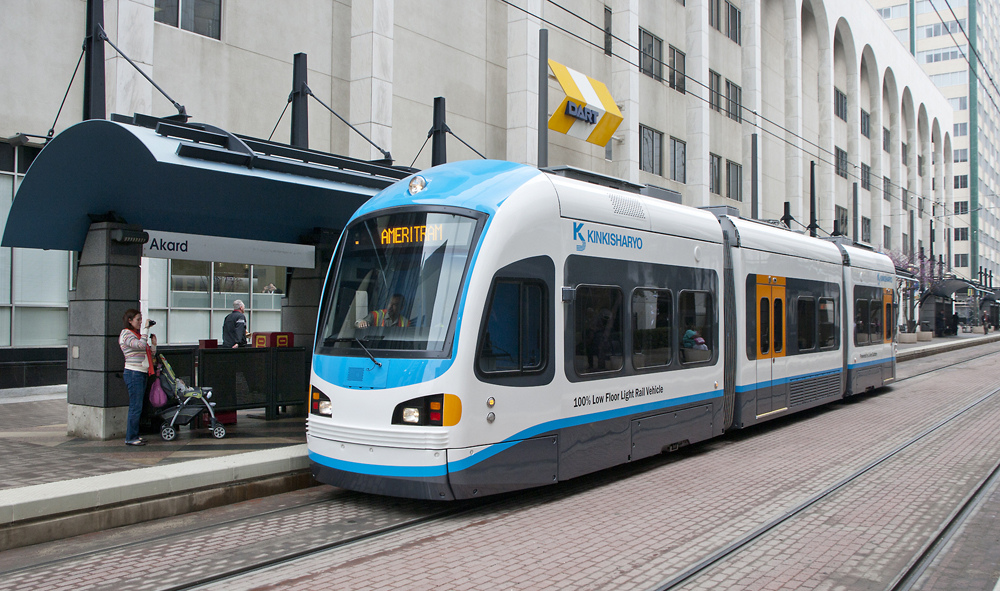
- The ameriTRAM testing on the DART light rail (2011)
- In service: Demonstrator only
- Manufacturer: Kinki Sharyo
- Constructed: 2010
- Number built: 1
- Capacity: 115 passengers, 28 seated (3-section); 150 passengers, 62 seated (5-section); 190 passengers, 96 seated (7-section)

Specifications
- Train length: 20 m (65 ft 7 13/32 in) (3-section); 30 m (98 ft 5 1/8 in) (5-section); 40 m (131 ft 2 13/16 in) (7-section)
- Width: 2.52–2.71 m (8 ft 3 7/32 in – 8 ft 10 11/16 in)
- Height: 38 m (124 ft 8 1/16 in)
- Floor height: 350 mm (1 ft 1 25/32 in)
- Articulated sections: 2 to 8 (three to nine sections)
- Wheel diameter: 600 mm (24 in)
- Maximum speed: 80 km/h (50 mph)
- Weight: 32 t (71,000 lb) (3-car set); 48 t (106,000 lb) (5-car set); 64 t (141,000 lb) (7-car set)
- Axle load: 10.3 t (23,000 lb)
- Traction system: IGBT–VVVF
- Traction motors: 4–8 × 120 kW (161 hp)
- Power output: 480–960 kW (644–1,287 hp)
- Acceleration: 1.3 m/s^{2} (2.91 mph/s)
- Deceleration: 1.3 m/s^{2} (2.91 mph/s) (service); 2.3 m/s^{2} (5.14 mph/s) (emergency)
- Auxiliaries: 440 V 60 Hz 3-phase AC IGBT static inverter; 110 V DC batteries
- HVAC: Roof-mounted duct-type air conditioning
- Electric systems: 750 V DC from overhead catenary
- Current collection: Single-arm pantograph or battery
- UIC classification: Bo′+0′+Bo′(+0′+Bo′(+0′+Bo′))
- AAR wheel arrangement: B-B(-B(-B))
- Braking systems: Regenerative braking, hydraulic disc brakes, electromagnetic brake
- Track gauge: 4 ft 8 1/2 in (1,435 mm) standard gauge

AmeriTram (stylized as ameriTRAM) is the name of a streetcar developed by Kinki Sharyo, a Japanese railway rolling stock manufacturer. Designed for the United States, it is an ultra-low-floor streetcar equipped with the "e-Brid" partial overhead wire-less system, which allows it to run on electricity stored in a rechargeable battery even in sections where overhead wires are not installed. Initially, the prototypes manufactured in 2010 were called LFX-300.

== Development process ==
Ever since it supplied the MBTA Green Line with their MBTA Kinki Sharyo Type 7 light rail vehicles in 1986, Kinki Sharyo has maintained a high market share in the streetcar and light rail vehicle market in the United States. Among these, the most frequently manufactured were partially low-floor LRVs, in which 70% of the interior, excluding the powered bogies at both ends, was low-floor. Meanwhile, while the demand for light rail and streetcars in the United States continued to increase, the demands for vehicles and facilities began to diversify, such as avoiding the installation of overhead lines in some sections to protect the urban landscape and simplify ground equipment , and aiming for environmentally friendly energy conservation. In response, Kinki Sharyo, together with its local subsidiary in the United States, Kinki Sharyo America, developed a new type of vehicle, called the ameriTRAM.

== Overview ==
The prototype consists of three articulated car bodies, with a leading car body (car A, car B) having a powered bogie sandwiching an intermediate car body (car C) with a floating structure and no bogie. The train could be extended to five or seven car bodies according to customer requests. By using a four-axle independent wheel system for the bogies, the leading car body was also made low-floor, and the entire interior (100%) of the car was made low-floor.

The seating arrangement inside the train consists of cross seats in the leading cars and long seats in the intermediate cars, with lithium-ion rechargeable batteries installed under the seats in the intermediate cars. The passenger doors are plug doors, with single-leaf doors in the leading cars and double-leaf doors in the intermediate cars.

To comply with stringent safety standards in the United States, vehicles for New Jersey Transit and Phoenix utilize a shock-absorbing structure that employs continuous wall buckling of specially designed aluminum profiles, arranged in parallel and in series along the longitudinal direction of the underframe at the end of the car. In addition, due to the presence of rechargeable batteries, ventilation openings for cooling are located on the underside of the intermediate car body, but strength is ensured by modifications to the shape of the underframe and structure.

To achieve a 100% low-floor structure, all bogies are motorized and use four-axle independent wheels without axles. Two traction motors are mounted on each bogie, and hydraulic disc brakes and emergency electromagnetic brakes are installed as braking systems. In addition, by using hydraulic suspension as a secondary spring system, precise control of the floor height is possible, and the air compressor is omitted, resulting in a simplified equipment structure. Electrical equipment such as control devices, auxiliary power supplies, and air conditioning systems are installed on the roof.

=== e-Brid ===
The most distinctive feature of the ameriTRAM is its "e-Brid", a partially overhead-wire-less system that, in addition to the electric motor, control device, and auxiliary power supply , is equipped with a lithium-ion rechargeable battery and charge/discharge control device, enabling it to run even in sections without overhead wires. In electrified sections, power supplied from the current collector (single-arm pantograph) flows to the control device and auxiliary power supply, and is then stepped down by the charge/discharge control device before flowing to the lithium-ion rechargeable battery for charging. In non-electrified sections (overhead-wire-less sections), the electricity stored in the rechargeable battery flows to the control device and auxiliary power supply via contactors. The braking system is equipped with regenerative braking , and the recovered power is stored in the rechargeable battery except when fully charged. As a result, the ameriTRAM can travel up to 8 km (5.0 mi) using the rechargeable battery.

This rechargeable battery module uses the "LIM30H-8A" type, jointly developed by GS Yuasa and Kinki Sharyo, with 24 modules mounted on each side of the intermediate car body, 12 on each side. Miniaturization and weight reduction are achieved by using highly insulating resin materials for the module's exterior components, and it also supports a forced cooling system, enabling efficient air cooling. In addition, a battery monitoring device is installed, and information such as the voltage of all cells and the module temperature is transmitted in real time to the charger and vehicle management system. The main specifications of the module are as follows.

LIM30H-8A lithium-ion rechargeable battery
Nominal voltage	28.8 V
Operating voltage range	23.2-33.2 V
Nominal capacity	30 ah
Continuous current	100 a
Maximum allowable current	600 a
Weight	20 kg (44 lb)

== Test runs ==
In 2010, a prototype three-car articulated train was completed, and test runs were first conducted in May of that year on a test track at the Kinki Sharyo factory in Japan. After its public debut in Charlotte, North Carolina in January 2011, it was exhibited and demonstrated in various cities including Dallas, Cincinnati, and Washington D.C.. Although several cities showed interest, ultimately other companies' ultra-low-floor trams were introduced, and as of 2019, mass production of ameriTRAMs have not taken place.

== Similar vehicles ==
Some of the technology used in the ameriTRAM, including the LIM30H-8A battery, would later be used in the Smart BEST, an experimental battery electric multiple unit that would be built by Kinki Sharyo in 2014 for use in Japan.

Likewise, in 2007, a few years before the ameriTRAM was built, GS Yuasa had contributed its battery technology to the Railway Technical Research Institute, for use on its RTRI LH02 "Hi-tram", an experimental variant of the Little Dancer series of trams. The technology on the LH02 is similar to the ameriTRAM, but the circuit configuration is different.

== See also ==
- SWIMO, an earlier experimental tram developed in 2006 by Nippon Sharyo, a competing company
- Inekon 121 Trio, a 2012 variant of the Inekon 12 Trio that is also fitted with batteries.
- Brookville Liberty Modern Streetcar, a later, more successful battery-electric streetcar built by Brookville Equipment for several American streetcar operators
- Siemens S700 and S70, a battery-electric variation of which has been used on the CityLynx Gold Line since 2021.
