= S Line (Valley Metro) =

Streetcar line in Tempe, Arizona

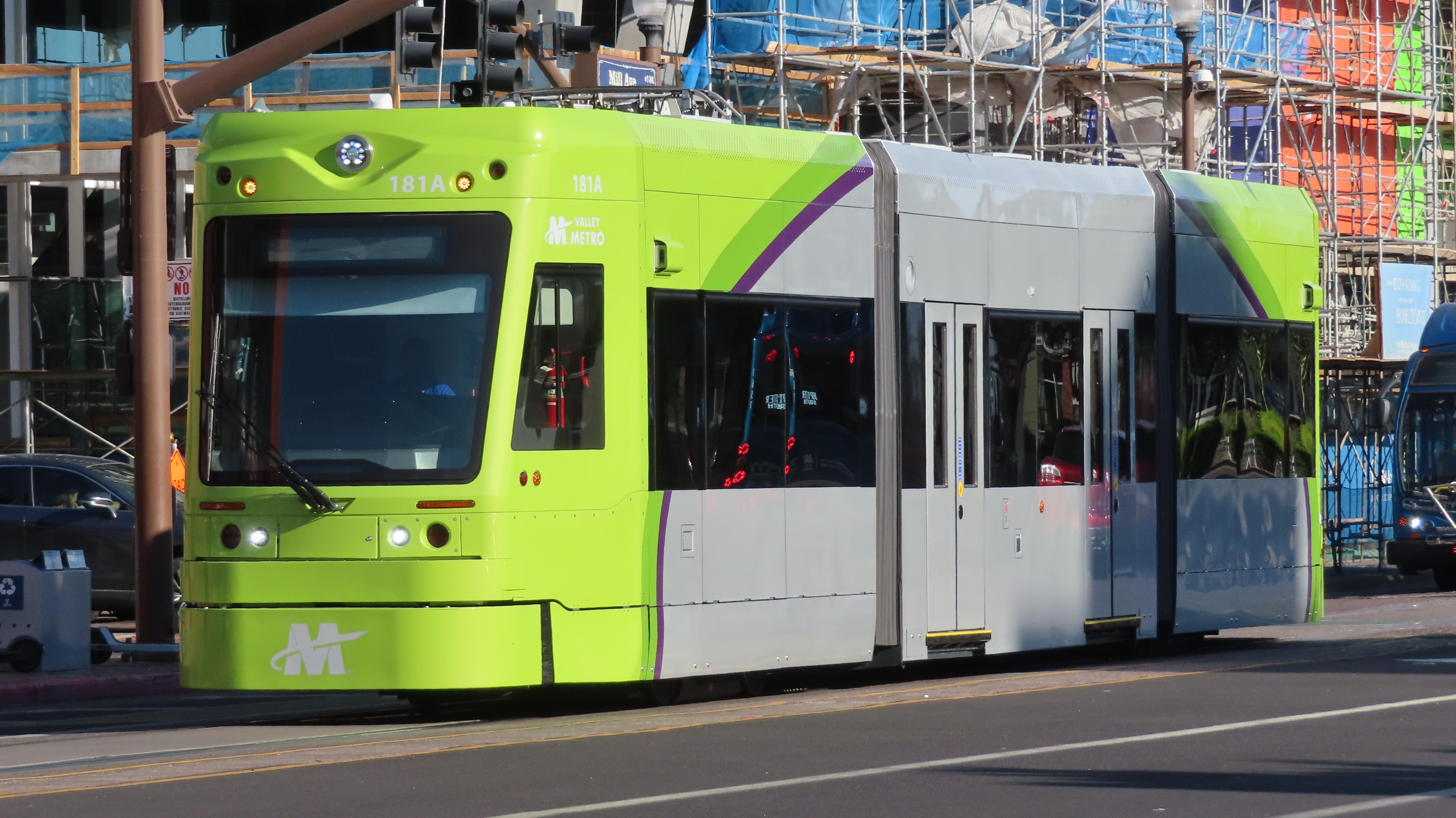

Overview
- Other name(s): Tempe Streetcar (prior to opening); Valley Metro Streetcar
- Owner: Valley Metro
- Locale: Tempe, Arizona, United States
- Termini: Marina Heights/Rio Salado Parkway; Dorsey/Apache Boulevard
- Stations: 14
- Website: www.valleymetro.org/streetcar

Service
- Type: Streetcar
- System: Valley Metro Rail & Streetcar
- Services: 1
- Operator: Valley Metro
- Rolling stock: Brookville Liberty Modern Streetcar
- Ridership: 793,628 (FY 2024)

History
- Opened: May 20, 2022

Technical
- Line length: 3 mi (4.8 km)
- Number of tracks: 2
- Character: Streetcar in mixed traffic
- Track gauge: 4 ft 8 1/2 in (1,435 mm) standard gauge
- Electrification: Overhead line, 750 V DC + battery
Route map
S Line highlighted in green

The S Line, also known as the Valley Metro Streetcar, and prior to opening as the Tempe Streetcar, is a modern streetcar in Tempe, Arizona, operated by Valley Metro. The 3-mile (4.8 km) line serves downtown Tempe, Tempe Town Lake, and the Arizona State University Tempe campus with 14 stations. Construction began in 2017, and the line opened for service on May 20, 2022.

== Route and service ==
The S Line serves a C-shaped route through Tempe, from Tempe Town Lake to the southern edge of the Arizona State University Tempe campus, via downtown Tempe. The line operates primarily in mixed traffic, operating in the curbside lane in downtown Tempe and in center lanes elsewhere. The S Line's southern terminus, Dorsey/Apache Blvd, is a shared station with the A Line. Another connection to the A Line is available at the S Line's Third St/Mill and Third St/Ash stations, which are within walking distance of the A Line Mill Ave/Third St station.

Upon launch, the S Line operated every 20 minutes. Weekday and Saturday service operates for 18 hours per day, and Sunday service operates for 16 hours per day. Northbound trips are scheduled at 19 minutes, and southbound trips are scheduled at 24 minutes.

On June 7, 2025, coinciding with the opening of the South Central extension, streetcar frequency was improved to every 15 minutes on weekdays and Saturdays until 7:00 p.m, running every 20 minutes afterwards. All-day 20 minute frequencies were retained on Sundays.

== Stations ==
The S Line has a total of 14 stops.

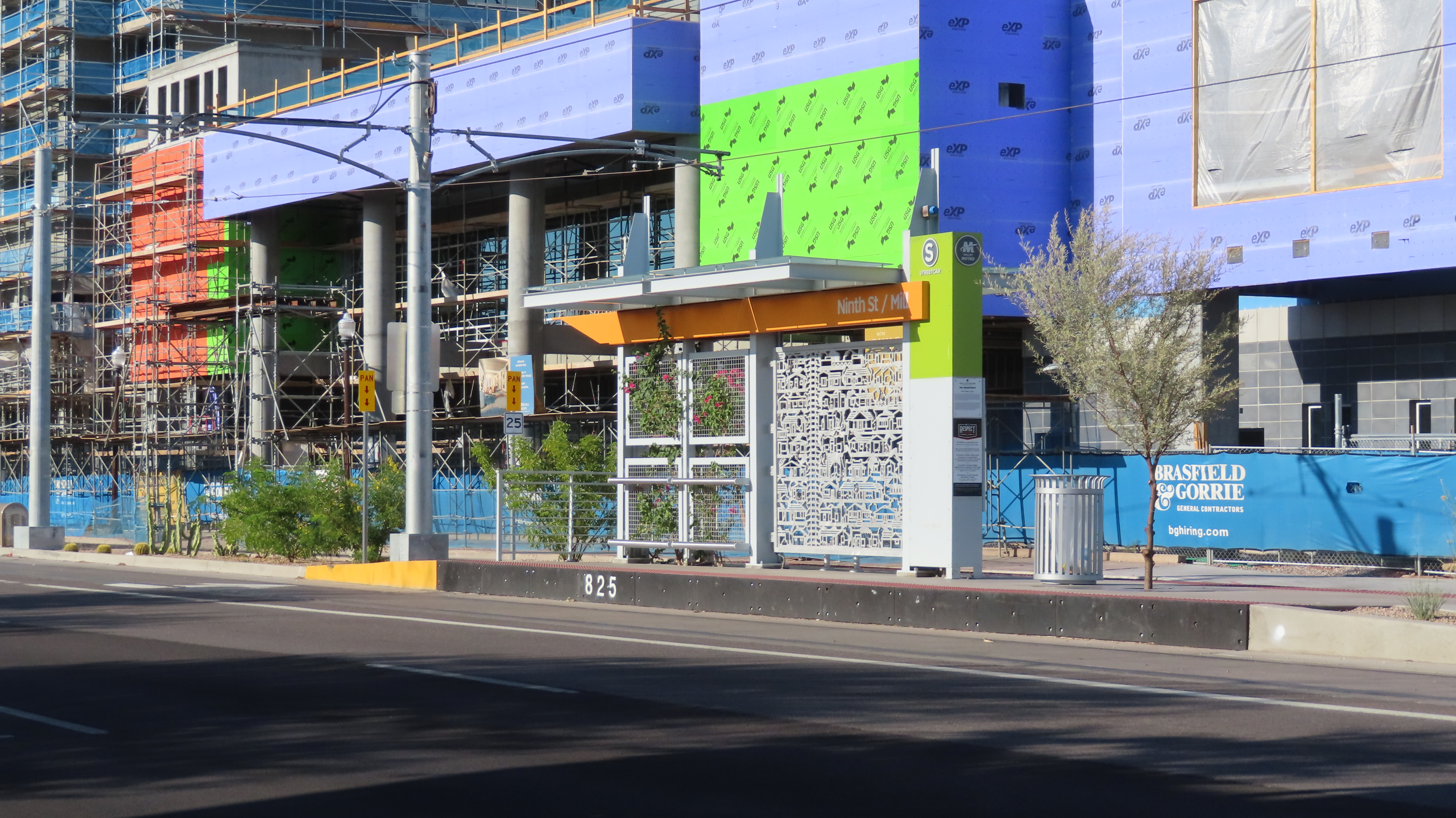
9th Street/Mill Avenue station platform

Station	Character area	↓	↑	Layout	Connections
Marina Heights/Rio Salado Parkway	Rio Salado	●	●	2 tracks, island platform, center of street	Northern terminus
Hayden Ferry/Rio Salado Parkway	Rio Salado	●	●	1 track, island platform, center of street	
Tempe Beach Park/Rio Salado Parkway	Rio Salado	●		1 track, side platform, center of street	
3rd Street/Mill Avenue	Rio Salado		●	1 track, side platform, curbside lane	(at Mill Avenue/3rd Street)
3rd Street/Ash Avenue	Rio Salado	●		1 track, side platform, curbside lane	(at Mill Avenue/3rd Street)
5th Street/Ash Avenue	Rio Salado	●		1 track, side platform, curbside lane	
6th Street/Mill Avenue	Rio Salado		●	1 track, side platform, curbside lane	
University Drive/Ash Avenue	Rio Salado	●		1 track, side platform, curbside lane	
9th Street/Mill Avenue	Rio Salado	●	●	2 tracks, island platform, center of street	
11th Street/Mill Avenue	Rio Salado	●	●	2 tracks, island platform, center of street	
College Avenue/Apache Boulevard	Apache	●	●	2 tracks, island platform, center of street	
Paseo del Saber/Apache Boulevard	Apache	●	●	2 tracks, island platform, center of street	
Rural/Apache Boulevard	Apache	●	●	2 tracks, island platform, center of street	
Dorsey/Apache Boulevard	Apache	●	●	1 track, side platform, center of street	A Line (Valley Metro)

== Technology ==
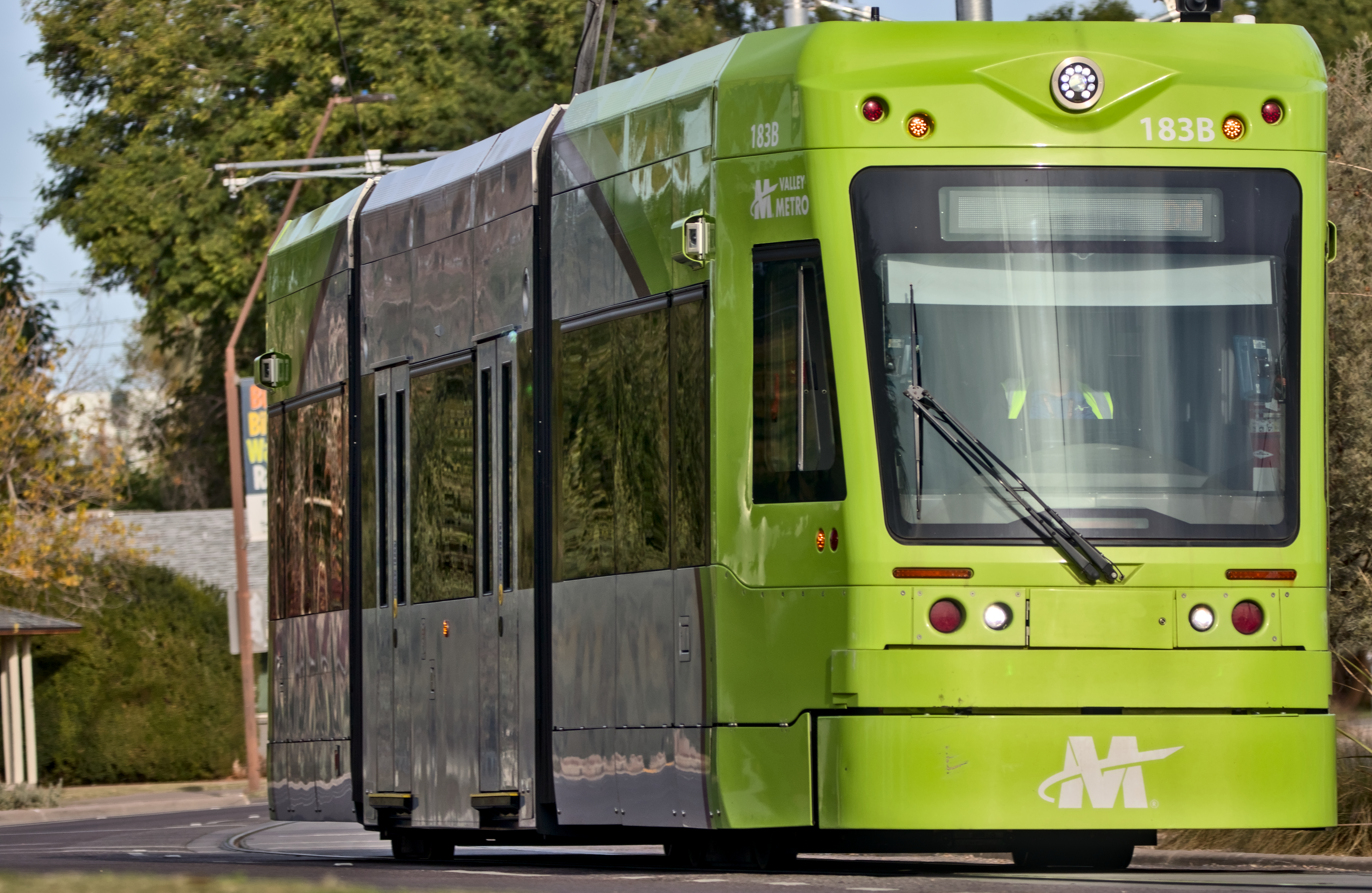
Tempe Streetcar #183 heading southeast on Apache Blvd around ASU Gammage

The S Line operates a fleet of six Brookville Liberty NXT cars, built by Brookville Equipment in Brookville, Pennsylvania. The cars are 70 feet (21 m) long, with 32 seats and a maximum capacity of approximately 120 passengers. S Line vehicles are of a 70% low floor design, and are fully accessible to individuals with disabilities.

S Line vehicles are stored and maintained at the Valley Metro Operations and Maintenance Center, located across the Salt River in Phoenix. The OMC was built in 2006 to serve the Valley Metro Rail system, and was expanded in 2021. S Line vehicles access the OMC via the A Line's trackage, which has a track connection to the S Line at Dorsey/Apache Boulevard station.

The majority of the S Line is powered by overhead lines at 750 V DC. Overhead lines are not installed in the central section of the S Line through downtown Tempe, and streetcars operate on battery power.

== Fares ==
The S Line launched with free service in 2022, and remained free until August 4, 2025. Fare machines were installed, and the Streetcar accepts the Copper Card or the Valley Metro App. The fare for the S Line is $1, lower than the standard Valley Metro local service fare of $2.

== History ==
The development of Tempe began in the 1870s, and with the opening of the Territorial Normal School at Tempe in 1886, the town grew rapidly. Local rail service in Tempe began in the 1890s, with the opening of a short horsecar line operated by the Tempe Street Railway. The line was unsuccessful, and closed before the end of the decade.

The city of Tempe began studying options for a downtown streetcar in 2007, while construction was underway on the Valley Metro Rail system. Plans were continuously revised for years, leading to concern that funding for the streetcar would be reallocated to other projects.

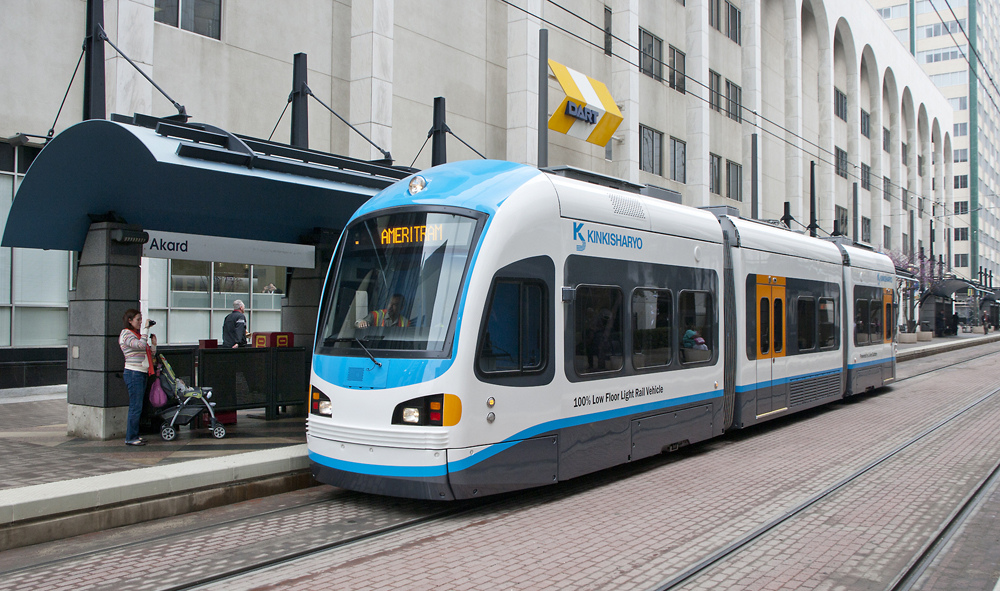
The prototype battery-powered Kinki Sharyo ameriTRAM, seen here in Dallas in 2011

The planning process for the Tempe Streetcar emphasized aesthetics in downtown Tempe, which led the city and Valley Metro to study alternatives to traditional overhead lines to power the streetcar. As part of the public outreach process, Valley Metro hosted a public exhibition of a prototype battery-equipped streetcar in 2011. The prototype "ameriTRAM" streetcar was built by Kinki Sharyo, the firm that built the original rolling stock for the Valley Metro Rail system, and was exhibited on light rail systems around the United States.

One proposed north-south route along Mill Avenue was denied federal funding in 2013, after the Federal Transit Administration found that it was not cost-effective. The route was revised to follow Rio Salado Parkway, Ash Avenue, Mill Avenue, and Apache Boulevard, and a final environmental impact statement was released in July 2015.

Valley Metro issued a request for proposals to obtain vehicles for the Tempe Streetcar in the summer of 2016. Potential suppliers originally included Alstom, Bombardier, CAF USA, Kinki Sharyo, Siemens and TIG/m. Vehicle options for this line included a combination of battery power, overhead catenary or on-board hydrogen fuel system.

Construction cost approximately $200 million and was funded by the Proposition 400 sales tax and federal grants. In February 2016, the project was included in President Barack Obama's budget for fiscal year 2017. A total of $75 million was dedicated to the project to supplement the Proposition 400 funds, as well as local funds and other federal grant funds. The final 2017 budget, approved in May 2017 under President Donald Trump, included $50 million.

In December 2016, Valley Metro selected Stantec Consulting Services for design work to be completed in 2017, allowing construction to start later in the year. Stantec has designed other streetcar projects in the United States and contributed to the design of the Valley Metro light rail system. In May 2018, the design was finalized.

Brookville Equipment Corporation was awarded the $33 million contract for six Liberty Streetcars in 2017. The Brookville Liberty is a commercial off-the-shelf vehicle equipped with lithium-ion batteries, which allows it to operate without overhead power for part of its route.

Construction began on June 1, 2017, with utility relocation, which made way for tracks to be laid. In August 2018, Valley Metro received approval from the Federal Transit Administration (FTA) to begin significant construction on the Tempe Streetcar. With this approval, Valley Metro began work on building the system's rail trackway, power systems and street improvements.

The first streetcar vehicle was delivered on March 14, 2021, and test runs began in June 2021. The line opened for service on May 20, 2022.

== Planned extension ==
As of 2024, Valley Metro is in the planning phases of extending the S Line past its terminus at Marina Heights into Mesa, via Rio Salado Parkway and Dobson Road. The proposed extension would serve major destinations in Mesa and eastern Tempe, including Tempe Marketplace and Sloan Park. The extension would be approximately 4 miles (6.4 km) in length.

The Rio East–Dobson Streetcar Extension (REDE) was awarded a $15.9 million federal grant in July 2024. The grant was funded by the Infrastructure Investment and Jobs Act, and will help advance the planning process for the proposed line.

== See also ==
- Streetcars in North America
- Valley Metro Rail & Streetcar
