= Bishop Arts District, Dallas =

Coordinates: 32°44′56.23″N 96°49′42.02″W

Bishop Arts District
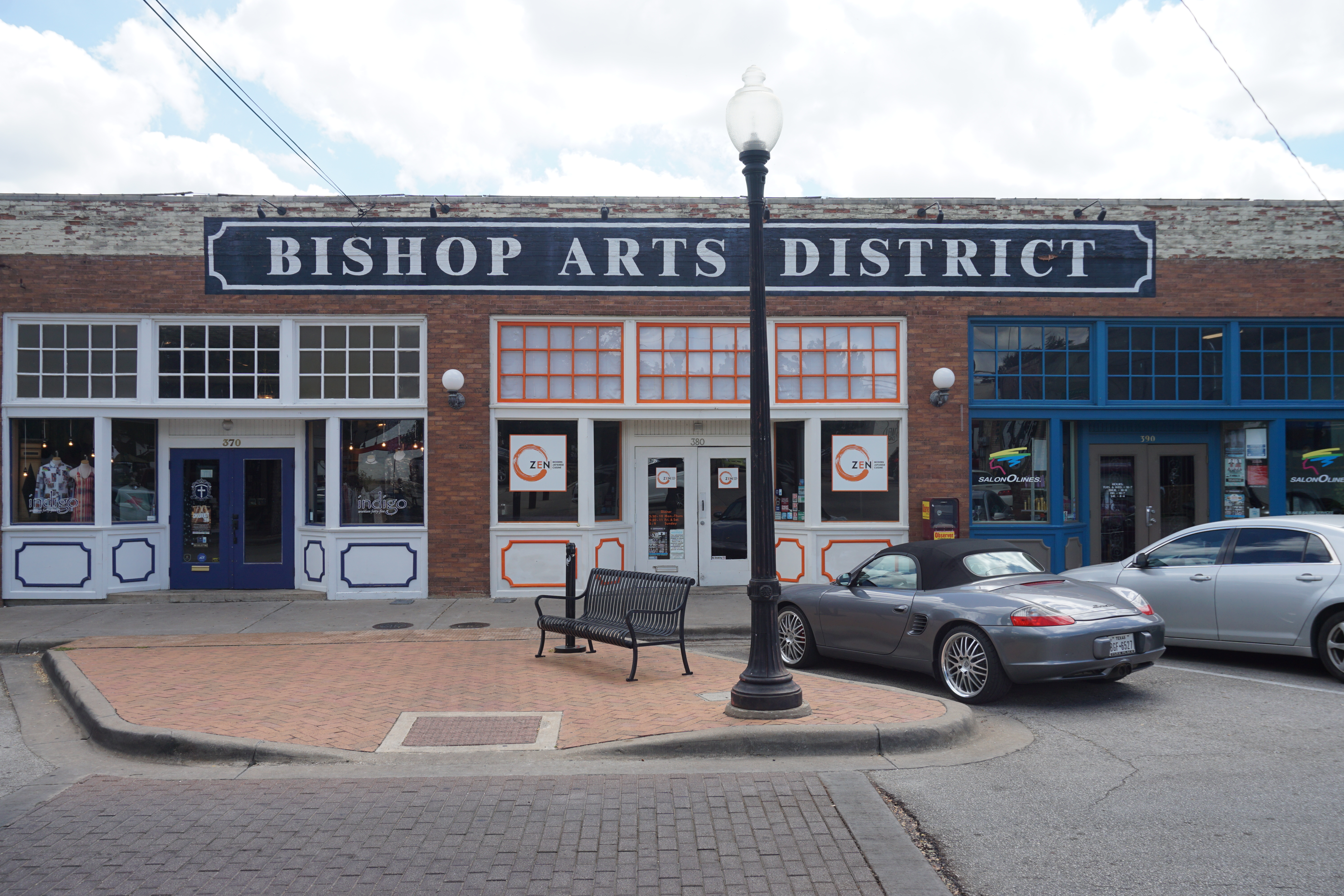
- Bishop Arts District in 2016
- Interactive map of Bishop Arts District
- Country: United States
- State: Texas
- Counties: Dallas
- City: Dallas
- Area: North Oak Cliff
- Elevation: 508 ft (155 m)
- ZIP code: 75208
- Area codes: 214, 469, 972
- Website: http://www.bishopartsdistrict.com

The Bishop Arts District is a shopping and entertainment district in north Oak Cliff, Dallas, Texas (USA), near the intersection of N. Bishop Ave and Davis Street. About two miles southwest of Downtown Dallas, the Bishop Arts District is home to a variety of independent boutiques, restaurants, bars, coffee shops, and art galleries.

== History ==
The area was originally developed as warehouses and shops in the 1920s. In the 1930s, a trolley stop along Davis became Dallas' busiest trolley stop. The district began a decline in the mid-1960s through the beginning of the 1980s. The reasons for the decline included the rise of the shopping mall, the loss of sizable tenants such as Astor theater and Goodier Cosmetics, neighborhood demographic changes and the elimination of Oak Cliff's streetcar system.

In the fall of 1984, Jim Lake saw a bargain in the now run down storefronts and began buying up property. He said, "Hopefully we'll make money on this in the future, but in the first three to five years I'm gonna feed it." Lake said of his decision to buy the property, "I just thought it needed saving." As a sign of his commitment, Lake provided, rent-free for a year, space for a police storefront. This was an important element in the area's security and sense of community.

Continuing through the 1990s and 2000s, renovations have taken place to transform the area into a walkable, urban environment. Murals, brick pavers, and other street elements have polished the rough look of the warehouses and have made the area a popular leisure and dining destination.

In 2015, Exxir Capital invested $42 million to construct a mixed-use development includes retail, office, and apartments in the district.

A portion of the district is listed on the National Register of Historic Places as the North Bishop Avenue Commercial Historic District.

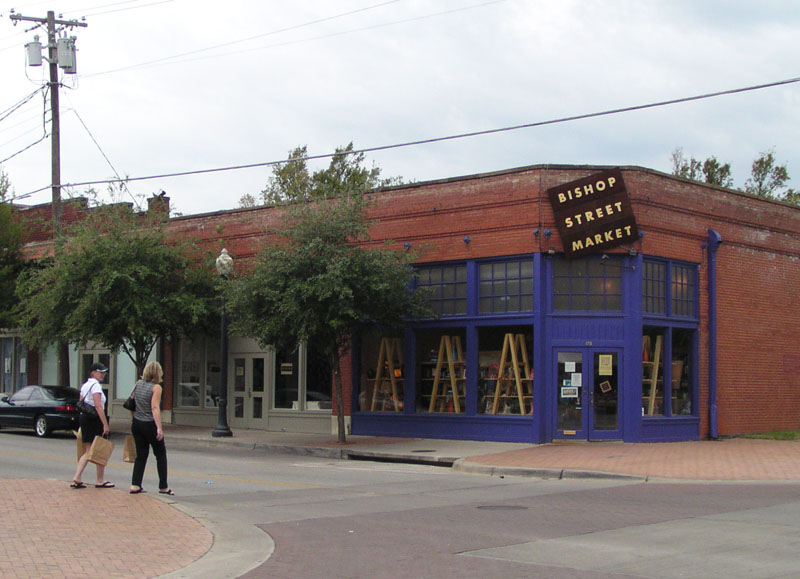
Looking southwest at Bishop Street & 7th Street

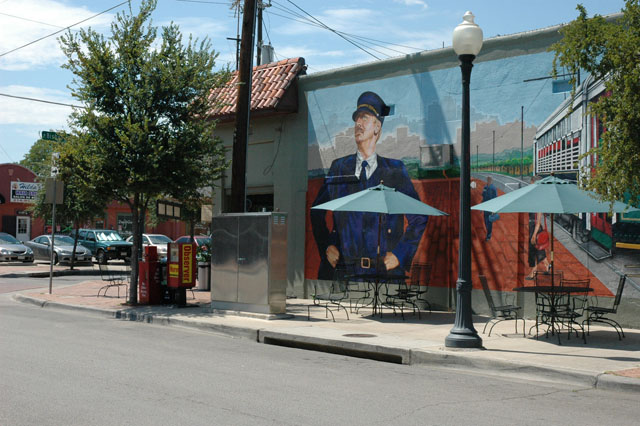
Former popular streetcar stop

== In popular culture ==
The Bishop Arts District has become a popular destination for celebrities to visit. Past celebrity sightings include Dua Lipa, Lana Del Ray, Leon Bridges, and The Weeknd.

The area's culture has continued to mature with the expanding Oak Cliff Film Festival, which has garnered media attention from Texas Monthly and The New York Times.

== Landmarks ==
- Mayor's House - former Dallas mayor George Sergeant's residence.

== Transportation ==
The district is served by several Dallas Area Rapid Transit bus routes. An extension of the Dallas Streetcar opened in 2016, expanding the line's southern terminus to the district, providing direct service to Dallas Union Station.

Preceding station	DART	Following station
Sixth Street toward Union Station	Dallas Streetcar	Terminus
