= Mill Avenue/3rd Street station =

Light rail and streetcar station in Tempe, Arizona

Coordinates: 33°25′39″N 111°56′26″W

Mill Ave/3rd St
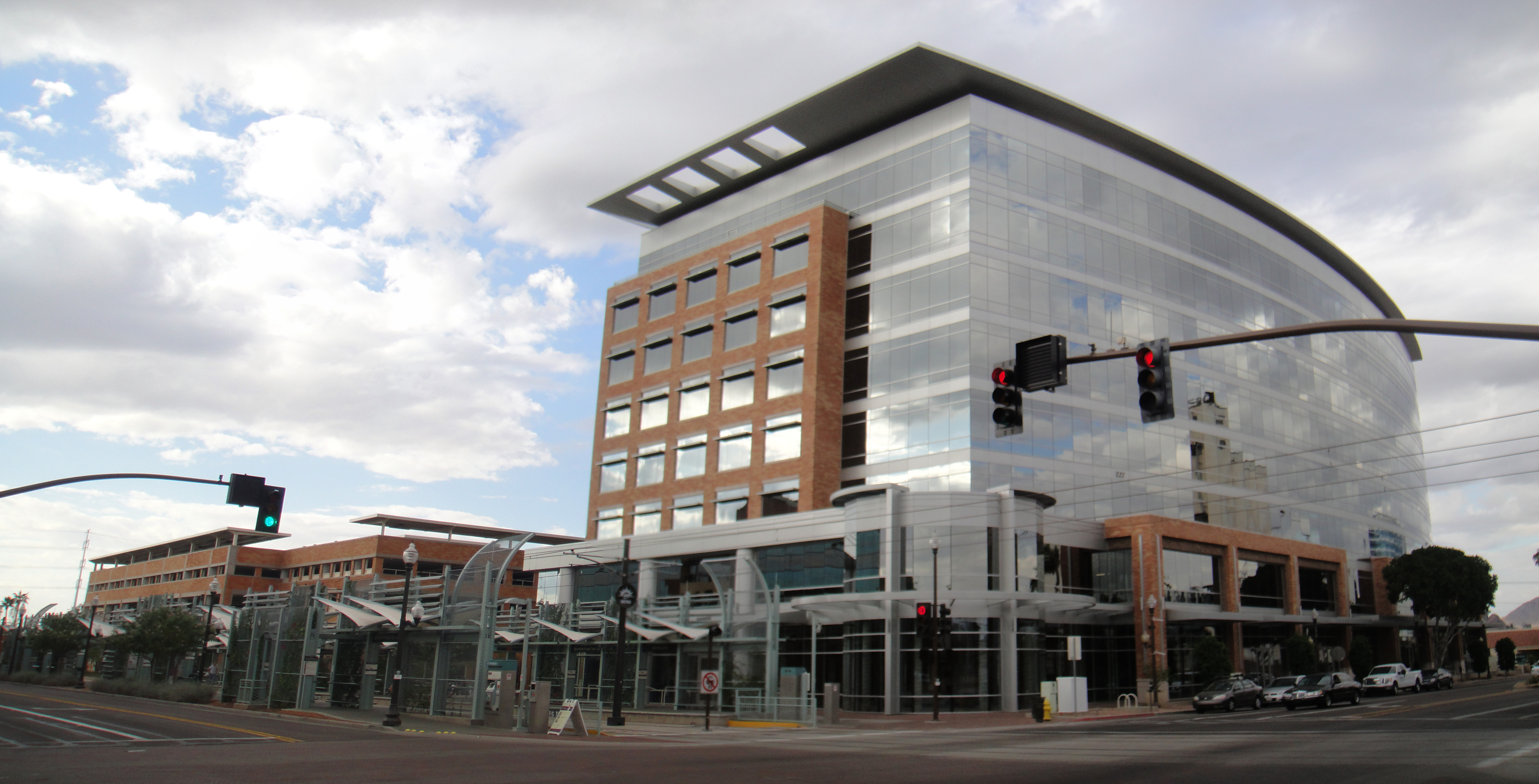
- The station in November 2009

General information
- Other names: Downtown Tempe/Town Lake (A Line); 3rd Street/Mill Avenue (S Line)
- Location: Mill Avenue and 3rd Street; Tempe, Arizona
- Owner: Valley Metro
- Operator: Valley Metro Rail & Streetcar
- Platforms: 2 side platforms
- Tracks: 2
- Connections: Valley Metro Bus: Tempe Orbit Earth

Construction
- Structure type: At-grade
- Accessible: Yes

Other information
- Station code: 10021

History
- Opened: December 27, 2008 (A Line); May 20, 2022 (S Line)

Services
Preceding station	Valley Metro	Following station
Mill Avenue/3rd Street
Center Parkway/Washington toward Downtown Phoenix Hub	A Line	Veterans Way/College Avenue toward Gilbert Road/Main Street
Hayden Ferry/Rio Salado Parkway toward Marina Heights/Rio Salado Parkway	S Line	6th Street/Mill Avenue One-way operation
3rd Street/Ash Avenue
Tempe Beach Park/Rio Salado Parkway One-way operation	S Line	5th Street/Ash Avenue toward Dorsey/Apache Boulevard
Location

Mill Avenue/3rd Street station, also known as Downtown Tempe/Town Lake, and as 3rd Street/Mill Avenue on the S Line, is a station on the A and S lines of the Valley Metro Rail & Streetcar system in Tempe, Arizona, United States. The station consists of two side platforms adjacent to 3rd Street, immediately west of Mill Avenue for the A Line, and one side platform on the eastern curb of Mill Avenue, immediately north of the A Line tracks for the northbound S Line. The southbound S Line instead stops at 3rd Street/Ash Avenue station, consisting of one side platform located one block to the west on the southwest corner of that intersection.

As of the opening of the S Line on May 20, 2022, it serves as one of two transfer stations between the A and S lines. Northbound S Line riders can easily make a direct transfer to the A Line. However, southbound riders must get off at 3rd Street/Ash Avenue station and take a slightly longer walk.

== Ridership ==
Weekday rail Ppassengers
Year	In	Out	Average daily in	Average daily out
2009	366,819	355,552	1,444	1,400
2010	294,376	311,821	1,164	1,232

== Notable places nearby ==
- Tempe Town Lake
- Tempe Depot
- Tempe Center for the Arts
- Tempe Butte / A Mountain

== Connections ==
Valley Metro Bus	Route number	Route name	North/east end		South/west end	
Valley Metro Bus	48	48th Street	Mesa Riverview		Baseline Road/Priest Drive	
Valley Metro Bus	62	Hardy Drive	Tempe Marketplace	Tempe Transportation Center (select weekday trips)	Guadalupe/Kyrene Road (select weekday trips)	IKEA Tempe
Valley Metro Bus	EART	Tempe Orbit Earth	Tempe Marketplace		Tempe Transportation Center	
