= Brookville Township =

Brookville Township may refer to the following townships in the United States:

- Brookville Township, Ogle County, Illinois
- Brookville Township, Franklin County, Indiana
- Brookville Township, Redwood County, Minnesota
