= Brookville, Illinois =

Brookville
- Unincorporated community
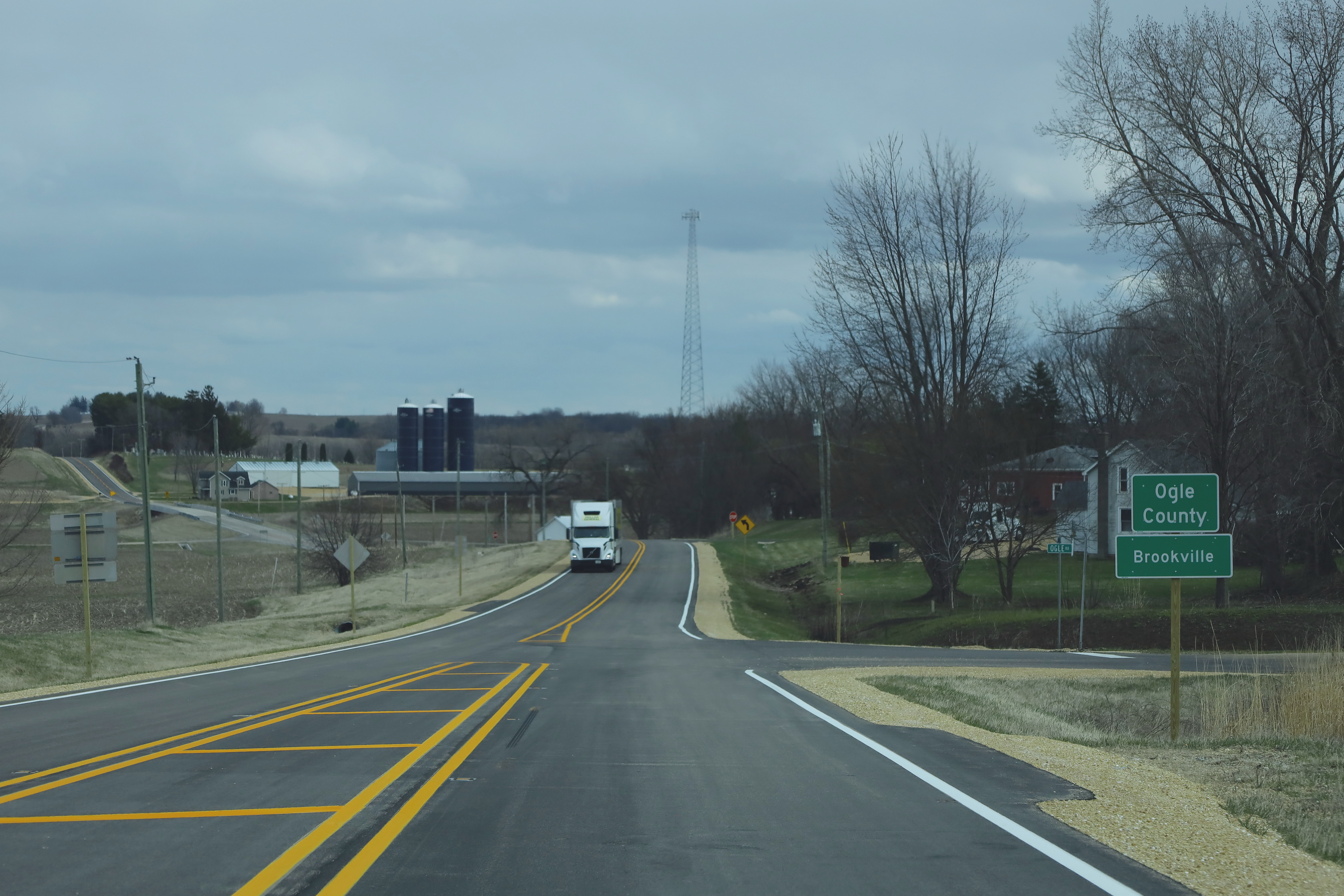

- Ogle County's location in Illinois

- Brookville's location in Ogle County
- Coordinates: 42°02′55″N 89°41′02″W
- Country: USA
- State: Illinois
- County: Ogle County
- Township: Brookville Township
- Elevation: 778 ft (237 m)
- Time zone: UTC-6 (CST)
  - Summer (DST): UTC-5 (CDT)
- ZIP code: 61064 (Polo)
- Area codes: 815, 779
- GNIS feature ID: 0404924

Brookville is an unincorporated community in Brookville Township, Ogle County, Illinois, USA.

== Geography ==
Brookville is located on the western border of Brookville Township and Ogle County, just south of the intersection of U.S. Route 52 and Illinois Route 64, at an elevation of 781 feet. The city of Polo is about 7 miles to the southeast.
