= Brooksville Independent-Graded School District =

School district in Kentucky, United States

Brooksville School

The Brooksville Independent-Graded School District is a former school district in Brooksville, Kentucky.

The District was founded in 1899, covering the City of Brooksville. It contained two schools, Brooksville Graded School and Brooksville High School.

The district was superseded by the Bracken County School District in 1946.
