= Brookville High School =

Brookville High School may refer to:

- Brookville High School (Ohio)
- Brookville High School (Virginia), Campbell County, Virginia
- Brookville Area Jr./Sr. High School, Jefferson County, Pennsylvania
