= Dallas Streetcar =

Modern streetcar line in Dallas, Texas

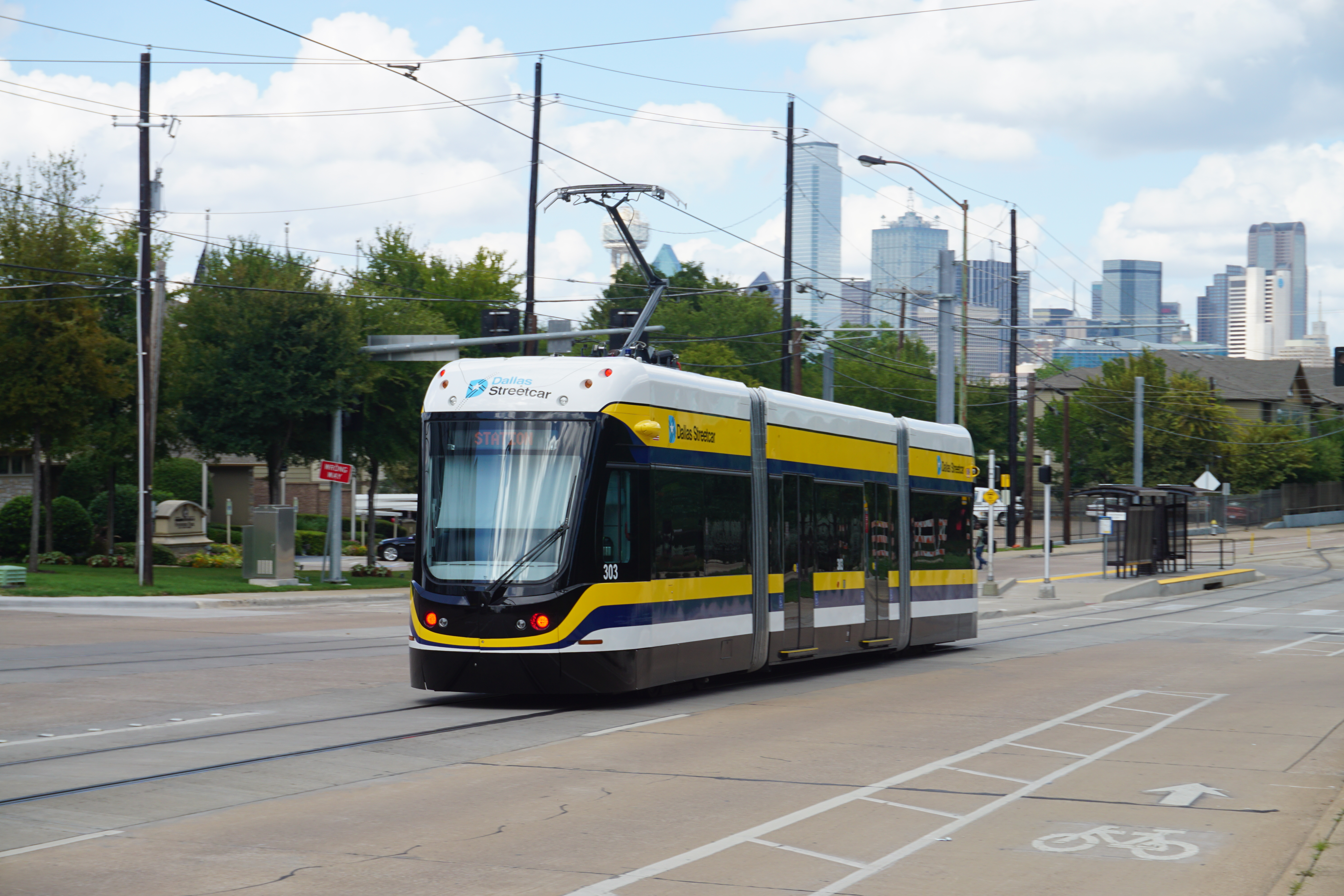
- A streetcar in the Oak Cliff area in 2016

Overview
- Owner: City of Dallas
- Locale: Dallas, Texas, USA
- Transit type: Streetcar
- Number of lines: 1
- Number of stations: 6

Operation
- Began operation: April 13, 2015
- Operator: Dallas Area Rapid Transit
- Character: Street running
- Rolling stock: Brookville Liberty Modern Streetcar
- Train length: 1 car
- Headway: 20 minutes

Technical
- System length: 2.45 mi (3.94 km)
- Track gauge: 4 ft 8 1/2 in (1,435 mm) standard gauge
- Electrification: Overhead line or onboard lithium-ion batteries, 750 V DC
System map
Dallas Streetcar highlighted in yellow

The Dallas Streetcar is a 2.45-mile (3.94 km) modern streetcar line in Dallas, Texas. It is owned by the city of Dallas and operated by Dallas Area Rapid Transit, which also operates Dallas's DART rail system. Construction on the line began in May 2013, and it opened for public service on April 13, 2015.

The streetcar line operates between downtown Dallas and Oak Cliff by way of the Houston Street Viaduct. The streetcar line originally operated from Union Station to Methodist Dallas Medical Center, but an extension to the Bishop Arts District opened on August 29, 2016.

== Background ==
The Dallas Streetcar project is a collaborative endeavor among DART, the city of Dallas, and the North Central Texas Council of Governments (NCTCOG). The project received $23 million in initial funding via a federal TIGER grant awarded to DART in December 2010. An additional $3 million in federal stimulus dollars was later granted to the project. DART reallocated $22 million in local funds to the streetcar project which were originally scheduled for a proposed people-mover between Inwood/Love Field station and the Love Field airport terminal. In January 2013, NCTCOG approved reallocating $31 million in state funds, which were also earmarked for the proposed Love Field people-mover, to the streetcar project. The combined funding would allow for construction of both the first and second phases of the streetcar project.

== Service ==
=== Phase 1 (Union Station to Dallas Methodist Medical Center) ===
Phase 1 of the Dallas Streetcar line, running from Union Station to Methodist Dallas Medical Center (the line's "Beckley" stop), opened on April 13, 2015. Service runs at 20-minute intervals on weekdays, with no cost to ride. In February 2016, streetcar operating hours were to be expanded to between 9:30am and midnight weeknights, and were to offer weekend service.

Construction on Phase 1 began in May 2013. By September 2014, most track construction for Phase 1 had been completed. The first of the two streetcars on order from Brookville was delivered on March 20, 2015. At the time of the phase 1 opening on April 13, 2015, the second streetcar vehicle had yet to be delivered. It was delivered on May 15, 2015.

=== Phase 2 (Dallas Methodist Medical Center to Bishop Arts District) ===
Phase 2 of the Dallas Streetcar line runs south from the line's original southern terminus at Methodist Dallas Medical Center (Beckley stop), to the Bishop Arts District in Oak Cliff. On April 28, 2015, the DART board of directors approved a construction contract for the Bishop Arts extension. On June 17, 2015, the Dallas City Council agreed to fund Phase 2 construction using up to $27.5 million in available grant money.

In preparation for the Phase 2 opening, DART said that the frequency of service would increase from 30 minutes to 20 minutes by introducing a second streetcar on the line. The extension opened on August 29, 2016.

=== Future expansion plans ===
Future plans for the streetcar line include extensions from Union Station to the Dallas Convention Center, and a connection to the M-Line Trolley via the Main Street District. The $96.2-million project, called the "Central Link", will use new tracks on Elm and Commerce to travel east from Union Station to Olive and St. Paul streets, connecting to the McKinney Avenue Trolley tracks. It was planned to be built in conjunction with the D2 Subway light rail project.

== Rolling stock ==
In February 2013, an order was placed with Brookville Equipment Corporation for two low-floor streetcars to provide the service on the line. The Brookville "Liberty" model articulated cars are 67 feet (20.42 m) long and have limited capability to operate away from overhead trolley lines by operating on battery power. This battery-powered operation allows the streetcars to travel across the Houston Street viaduct, which does not have overhead lines installed. The first car (No. 302) was delivered on March 20, 2015, and at the time of the line's opening in mid-April it was the only car in the fleet. The second car, No. 301, was delivered on May 15, 2015. Dallas ordered two more streetcars in July 2015. The third and fourth cars (Nos. 303–304) were delivered in summer 2016.

== Stops ==
Listed from Downtown Dallas to Oak Cliff

Station	Intersection	Connections	Platform	Notes
EBJ Union Station	S Houston Street and Young Street	Amtrak: Texas Eagle; Trinity Railway Express; DART rail: Blue Line, Red Line; DART Bus: 9, 45, 47, 145, 214, 224, 306	curbside (west)	northern terminus Five-minute walk to Union Station building Serves Reunion Tower, Downtown Dallas
Greenbriar	N Zang Boulevard and Greenbriar Lane		curbside (west)	Serves Oak Cliff Founders Park
Oakenwald	Zang and Oakenwald Street	DART Bus: 47	island	single-track north of this stop Serves Lake Cliff Park
Beckley	E Colorado Boulevard and N Beckley Avenue	DART Bus: 109	island	Serves Methodist Dallas Medical Center
6th Street	Zang and Sixth Street	DART Bus: 109	island	Serves Oak Cliff Chamber of Commerce
Bishop Arts	Zang and Davis Street	DART Bus: 109, 226	curbside (west)	southern terminus Serves Bishop Arts District

== See also ==
- DART rail
- M-Line Trolley
- Light rail in the United States
- Streetcars in North America
- List of tram and light rail transit systems
