= QLine =

Streetcar system in Detroit, Michigan

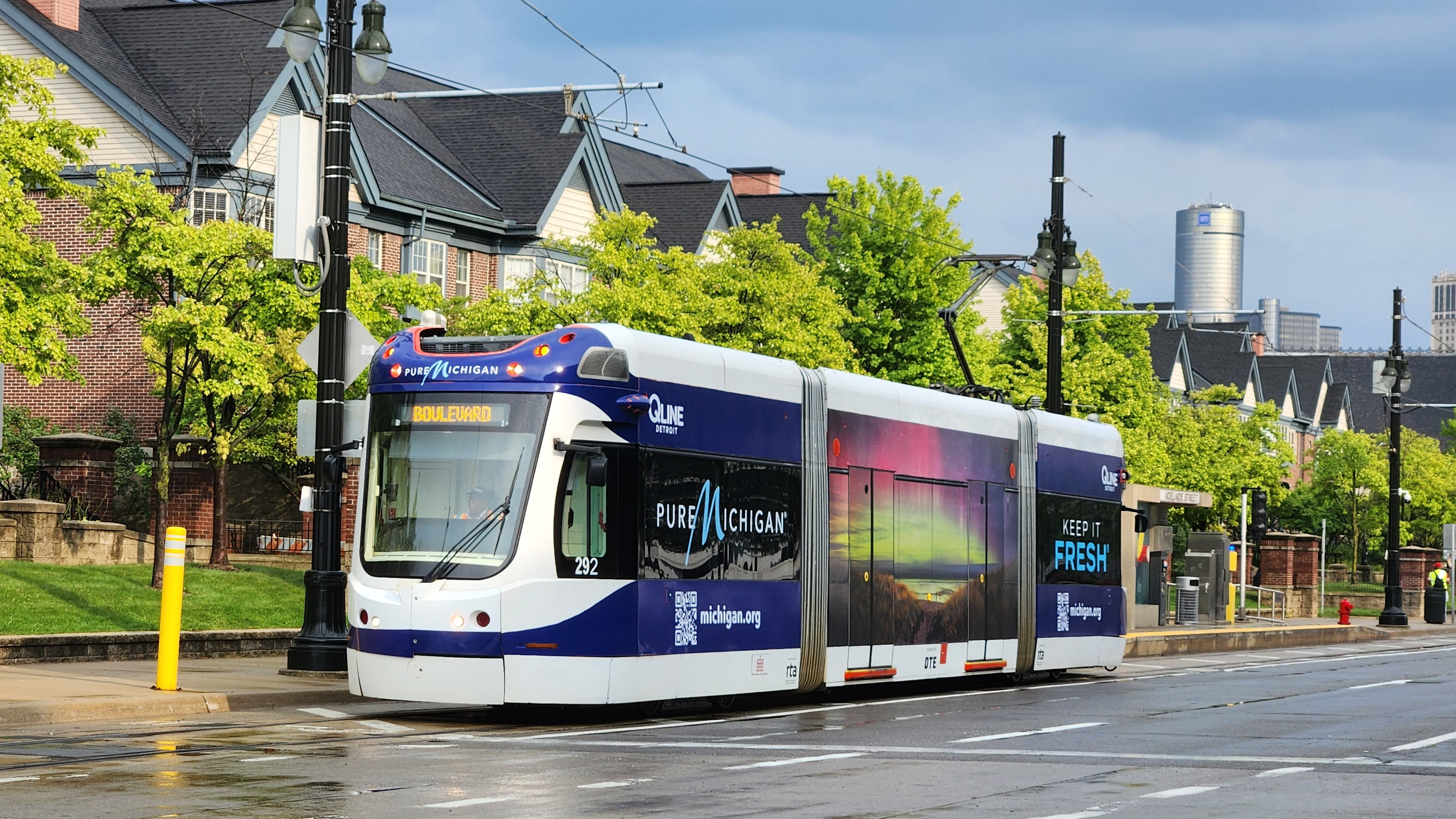
- QLINE tram near Little Caesars Arena in 2025

Overview
- Owner: RTA
- Locale: Detroit, Michigan
- Termini: Grand Boulevard; Congress Street
- Stations: 20 stops (12 locations)
- Website: qlinedetroit.com

Service
- Type: Streetcar
- Operator(s): Transdev (2017–2021); M-1 Rail (2021–2024); RTA (2024–present)
- Rolling stock: 6 Brookville Liberty Modern Streetcars
- Daily ridership: 3,185 (2024)

History
- Opened: May 12, 2017

Technical
- Line length: 3.3 mi (5.3 km)
- Track gauge: 4 ft 8 1/2 in (1,435 mm) standard gauge
- Electrification: Overhead line or onboard lithium-ion batteries, 750 V DC
- Operating speed: 30 mph (48 km/h)
Route map
QLine highlighted in red

The QLINE is a 3.3-mile-long (5.3 km) streetcar system in Detroit, Michigan, United States. Opened in 2017, it connects Downtown Detroit with Midtown and New Center, running along Woodward Avenue for its entire route. It is supplemented by the Detroit People Mover, which serves as a circulator route in downtown Detroit, and also connects to the DDOT and SMART bus routes as part of a comprehensive network of transportation in metropolitan Detroit.

Uniquely among U.S. rail transit systems, the QLINE was developed and constructed by a public–private partnership, and initially owned by a private nonprofit organization, known as M-1 Rail. Since 2024, the system has been owned and operated by the Regional Transit Authority of Southeast Michigan.

In December 2011, city and state leaders announced a plan to offer bus rapid transit service for the city and metropolitan area instead of light rail as had previously been proposed. Soon afterwards, M-1 Rail, a consortium of private and public businesses and institutions in the region, announced the plan for a streetcar line along part of the same route as the cancelled light rail plan, connecting the downtown Detroit People Mover to the Amtrak railway station in New Center and the proposed Ann Arbor–Detroit Regional Rail system. Rocket Mortgage (then known as Quicken Loans) bought the naming rights to the line, and announced the name in March 2016.

== History ==
=== Antecedents ===
==== 1863–1956 ====
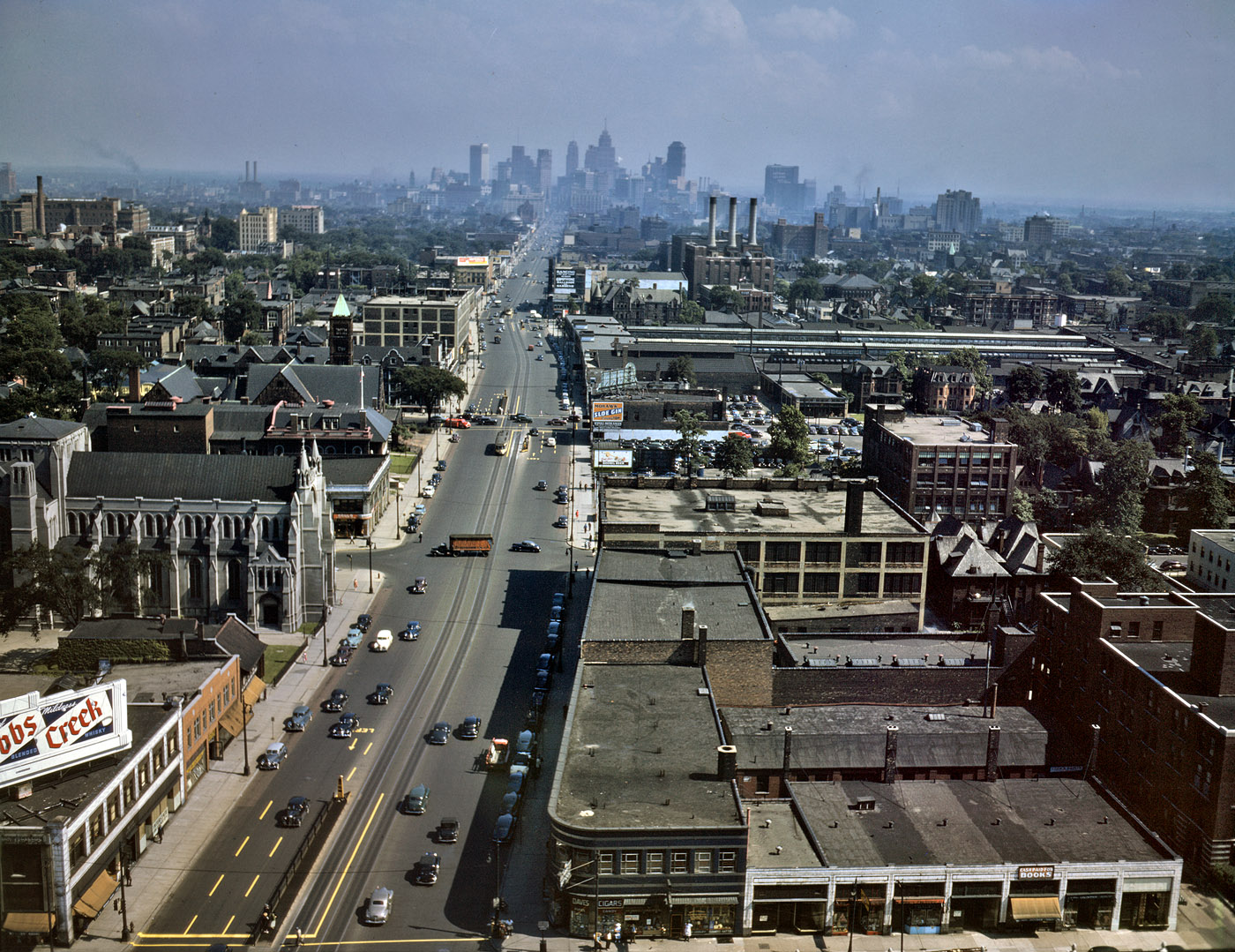
Woodward Avenue with streetcar lines, 1942. Photograph by Arthur Siegel.

Detroit's first streetcar service began in 1863 with horsecars. Electrification of the streetcar system followed, starting in 1886. Detroit's streetcar lines eventually saw their operations consolidated under the privately owned Detroit United Railway. Municipal takeover and control of the streetcar network by Detroit's Department of Street Railways followed in 1922. Detroit Mayor Hazen S. Pingree had led the charge years before to have the city take over operations. Since that gave the companies reason to believe the rail lines would be taken over, they were discouraged from maintaining the lines, which meant that Detroiters had "inherited a giant money pit" when the city eventually voted to buy them. That and the Department of Street Railways' introduction of buses from 1925 ultimately led to the demise of the original streetcar system in 1956.

==== Downtown heritage trolley ====
A short 0.7-mile (1.1 km) vintage streetcar gauge line in 900 mm (2 ft 11 7/16 in) gauge opened in 1976 along Washington Boulevard, using seven former Lisbon tramcars and two from England and Switzerland, all originally built in the early 20th century. Built at a cost of roughly $1.5 million (equivalent to $6.6 million in 2025), the line initially ran between Grand Circus Park and Philip A. Hart Plaza near Cobo Center. The line was extended a further 0.3 miles (0.48 km) along Jefferson Avenue in 1980. It ended service in 2003. Ridership at one time had seen 800 daily passengers, but declined to under 200 after the 1987 opening of the competing Detroit People Mover system.

=== M-1 Rail Line ===
M-1 Rail logo

In 2006 the Detroit Department of Transportation (DDOT) commissioned a study to determine expanded mass transit options along Woodward Avenue. Concurrently, a private group of local business leaders decided to provide matching funds to government dollars to develop a $125 million, 3.4-mile (5.5 km) line through central Detroit (similar to the Tacoma Link) called the M-1 Rail Line. After much wrangling between the private investors and the DDOT, the two groups decided to work in tandem on developing DDOT's 9.3-mile (15.0 km) line.

The proposed line ran 9.3 miles (15.0 km) along Woodward Avenue from the Rosa Parks Transit Center to the old State Fairgrounds along 8 Mile Road. The line would have had 19 stops with 10 cars running at a time in two-car trains; each train would carry 150 people. The trains would run in a dedicated right-of-way in the median from 8 Mile to Adams Street at the north end of downtown. South of Adams, the trains would run in mixed traffic along the sides of the street.

The estimated cost for the proposed line was $500 million. The Kresge Foundation awarded a $35 million grant to the city for the project in March 2009. It received $25 million in funding from the United States Department of Transportation in February 2010. The Detroit City Council approved the sale of $125 million in bonds on April 11, 2011. The Federal Transit Administration (FTA) and the City of Detroit signed an environmental impact study on July 1, 2011. Finally, on August 31, 2011, the FTA signed a record of decision allowing the project to move forward.

In December 2011, the federal government withdrew its support for the proposed line, in favor of a bus rapid transit system which would serve the city and suburbs. This decision arose out of discussions between federal Secretary of Transportation Ray LaHood, Detroit Mayor Dave Bing and Governor Rick Snyder. The private investors who had initially supported the smaller three-mile (4.8 km) M-1 Rail line to New Center stated that they would continue developing that project through the nonprofit M-1 Rail Consortium. The cancelled 9.3-mile (15.0 km) proposal would have featured seven additional stops north of Grand Boulevard, where the QLine now ends.

=== Construction ===
On January 18, 2013, U.S. Department of Transportation Secretary Ray LaHood announced that M-1 Rail would receive $25 million in federal grant support for the streetcar project. He had previously committed to the funds on the condition that a regional transit authority was created for the Detroit area. In late 2012, the Regional Transit Authority of Southeast Michigan was created by state law, which enabled LaHood's approval.

On April 22, 2013, the project received final environmental clearance from the federal government, with construction expected to start in the fall.

On December 20, 2013, M-1 Rail began underground utility relocation work along Woodward Avenue, the first step toward full-fledged construction activities of the 3.3-mile (5.3 km) streetcar line, with construction scheduled to start in mid-2014. Stacy Witbeck were formally awarded the contract to construct the M-1 Rail streetcar line on July 31, 2013. M-1 Rail officials announced on July 3, 2014, that the Woodward Avenue overpasses for both I-75 and I-94 freeways will be demolished during construction of the rail line, and that new wider bridges will be built.

On July 20, 2014, the Ilitch family, owner of Olympia Development of Michigan, and major investor in M-1 Rail, announced that the streetcar line would include a stop at the new Little Caesars Arena in Midtown.

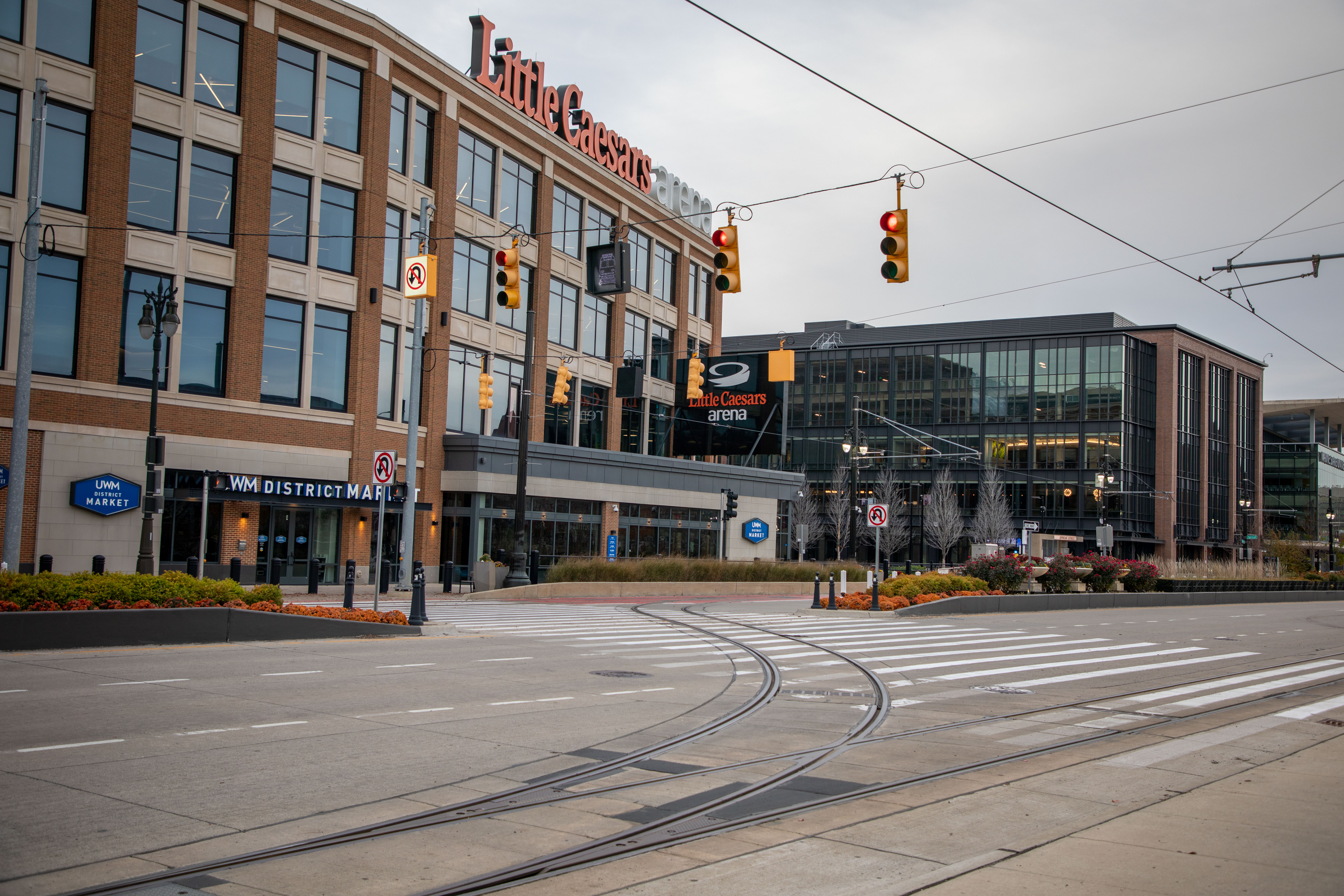
QLine tracks at Little Caesars Arena

M-1 Rail officially started construction on July 28, 2014. The streetcar line would stretch from downtown Detroit to Grand Boulevard in New Center. There would be 20 different stations serving 12 stops, with most of the stations being curbside on either side of Woodward Avenue going uptown or downtown, but changing to center road stations at the north and south ends of the system. At the time, the streetcar line was expected to be operational in late 2016.

During the planning of the service, Detroit businessman Dan Gilbert advocated strongly for a curb-running design. One participant said, "They were not looking for speed or reliability... their number one goal was the boost in property values."

On September 9, 2014, the US DOT announced that M-1 Rail would receive an additional $12.2 million in federal grant money to complete the financing of the M-1 Rail project. US Transportation Secretary Anthony Foxx gave the keynote address at a rail signing ceremony on September 15, 2014, at Grand Circus Park. Local officials were in attendance as were executives of local businesses who were sponsoring stations near their places of business. A new official map was made public.

Approximately 60 percent of the line is not equipped with overhead electrical wires, and the streetcars are powered solely from lithium-ion batteries on that section.

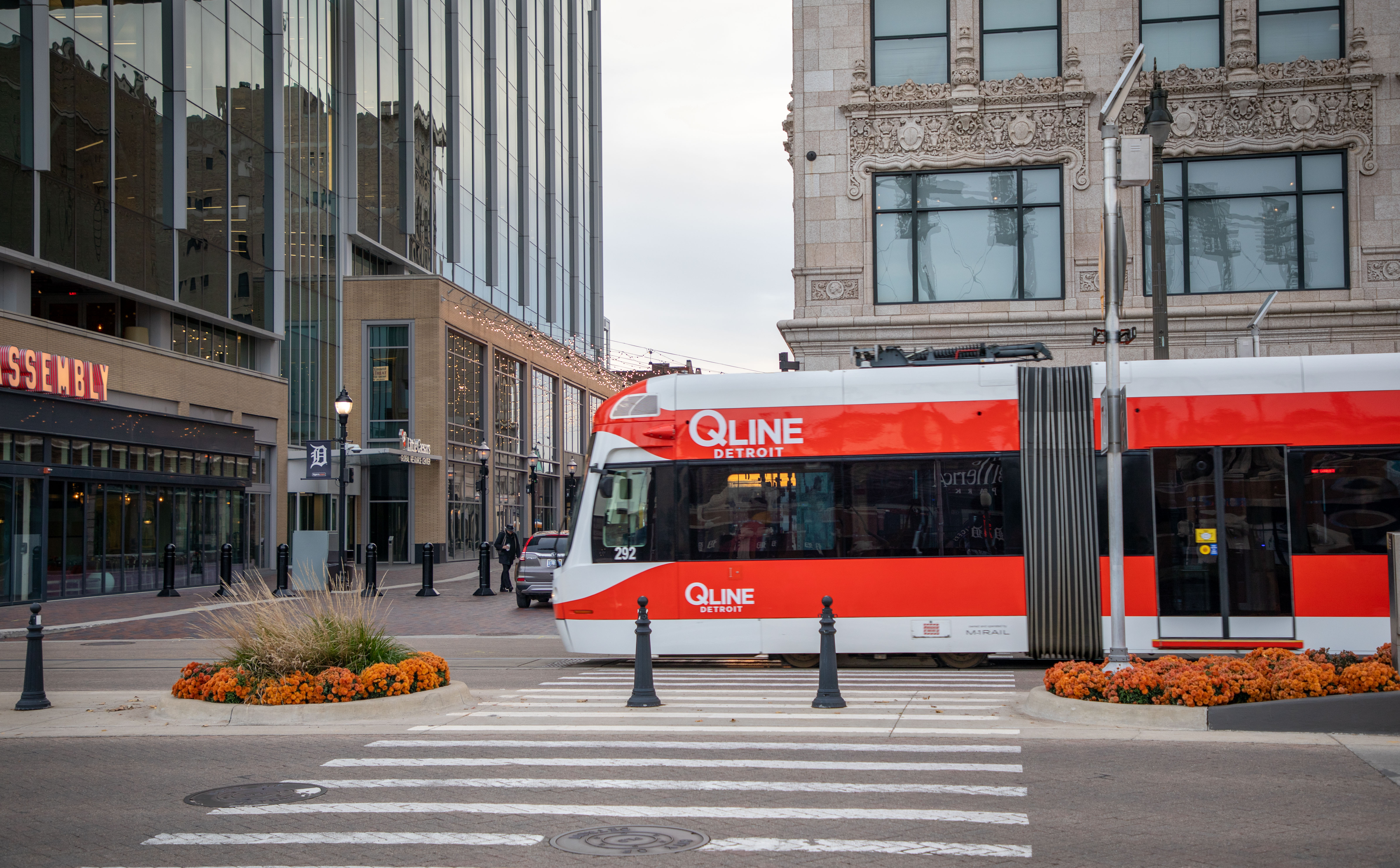
QLine near Fox Theatre running on battery

On February 15, 2015, M-1 Rail reported that the Penske Tech Center was under construction in New Center. The $6.9 million, 19,000-square-foot (1,800 m^{2}) structure serves as the M-1 Rail headquarters, the operations center, and the streetcar maintenance facility. The tech center building is sited close to Woodward Avenue, and located between Bethune and Custer streets north and east of Grand Boulevard with the streetcar storage yard behind. The exterior is made of reddish brick to mimic the historical look and feel of the surrounding neighborhood, and was completed in May 2016.

In August 2015, M-1 Rail officials said that the opening of the line would be delayed until around mid 2017, partially because of new federal safety standards that are coming into effect, as well as a construction slowdown during the previous winter and delays in building the rolling stock. QLine was announced as the official name for the line in March 2016, after Quicken Loans bought naming rights, but the non-profit organization that is overseeing the project continues to be named M-1 Rail.

The first streetcar was delivered in September 2016. The first test move over the line took place on December 13, and the streetcar was initially towed (not yet run under its own power, except at the maintenance facility). Transdev was awarded a five-year contract to operate the line.

=== Opening ===
The QLine opened for public use on May 12, 2017. Although initially slated to be free only for the first weekend, the streetcar's free period was later extended for a week, and later until July 1, and again until Labor Day 2017. Ridership for the opening week was 50,000, with a peak of 8,300 during the weekend and 5,120 Monday through Thursday. Daily ridership dropped to 3,000 when the payment service began on September 5, 2017. The percentage of riders actually paying was 40 percent, which QLine spokesman Dan Lijana said is higher than the 32.5 percent national average of similar downtown city rail systems.

=== COVID-19 shutdown and reopening ===
On March 28, 2020, the QLINE suspended service, due to low ridership amid the COVID-19 pandemic. Service resumed in September 2021 without fares, with financial support from Penske and The Kresge Foundation. In November 2021, QLINE ended its contract with Transdev and became directly operated. In 2022, a 17-year, $5 million annual subsidy was approved by the Michigan Legislature and signed by Governor Gretchen Whitmer, which will keep the QLINE free to ride through 2039.

== Rolling stock ==
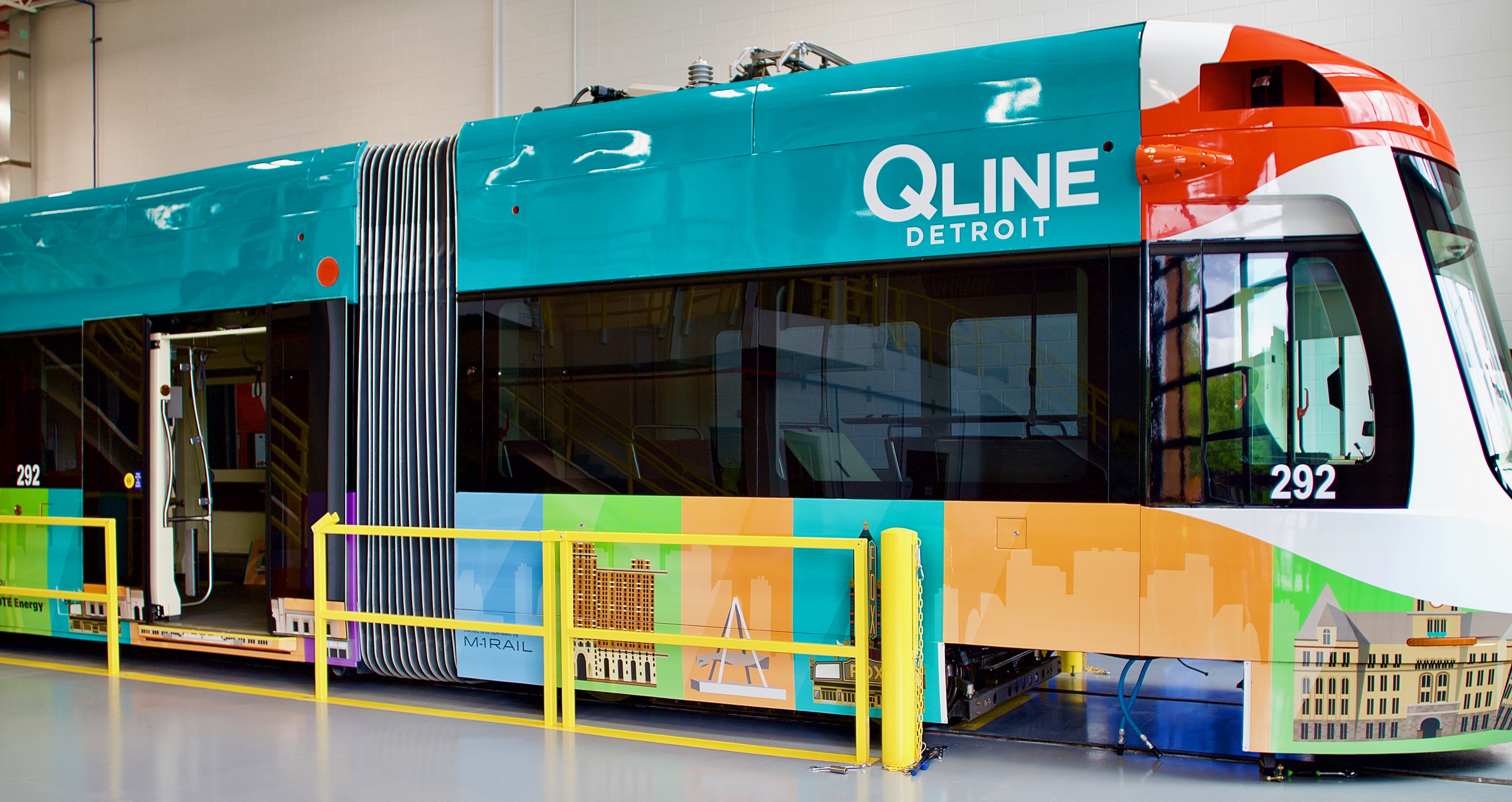
A Brookville Liberty streetcar in opening-day livery, 2017

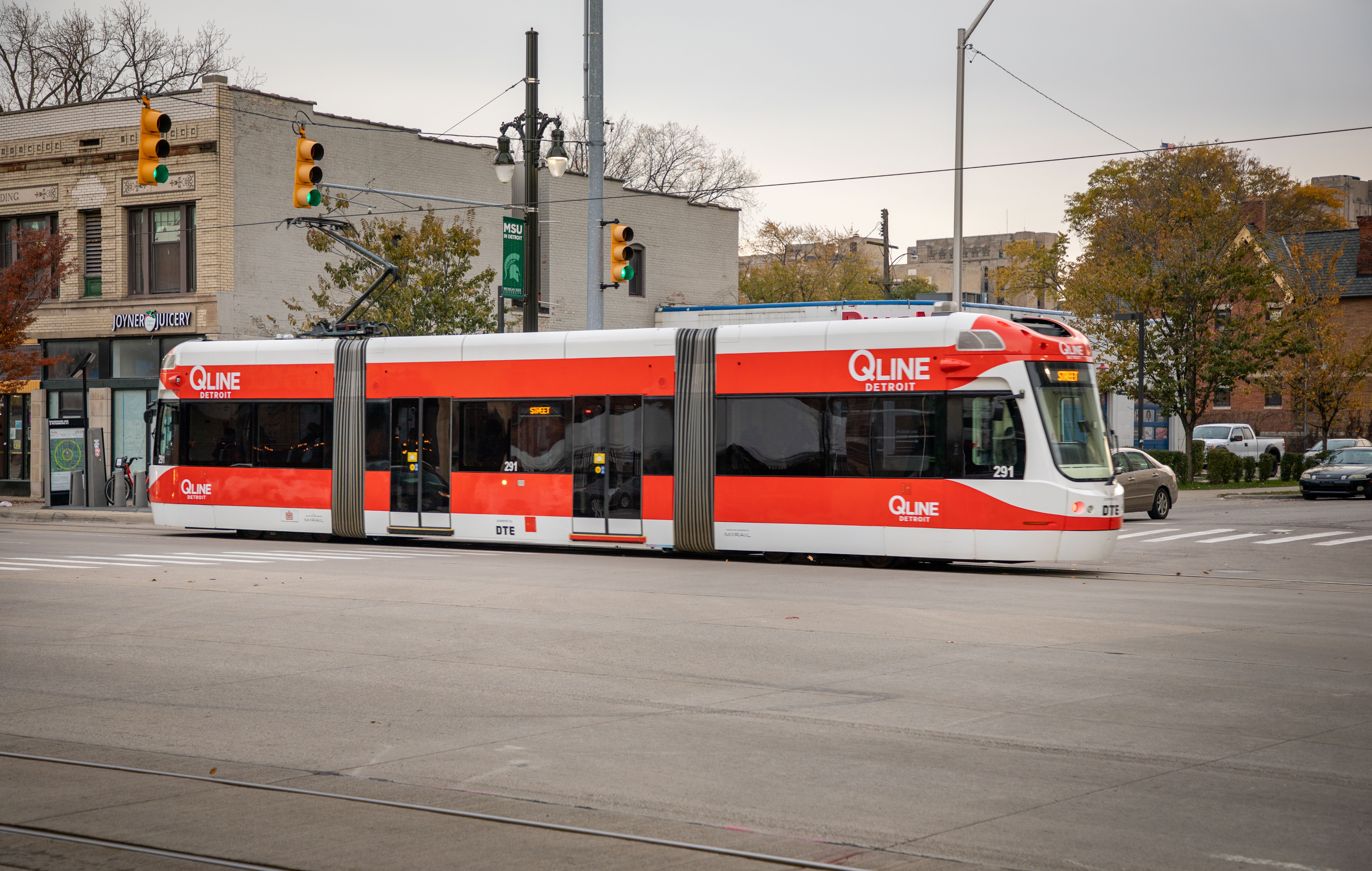
QLine at Woodward and Peterboro in 2021

Crain's Detroit Business reported that the line would cost $137 million, including the purchase of six streetcar vehicles. Bids were expected to include low-floor, air-conditioned vehicles, capable of transporting passengers in wheelchairs. The vehicles have operator's controls at both ends—eliminating the need for the vehicles to turn around for their return trips.

On November 4, 2014, M-1 announced that Czechia-based Inekon had been awarded a $30 million contract for six vehicles. Upon that deal falling apart, M-1 Rail instead awarded a $32 million contract to Pennsylvania-based Brookville Equipment Corporation. The purchase includes six articulated, three-section, 66-foot-long (20.12 m) cars, equipped with 750-volt rechargeable lithium-ion batteries for off-wire movement on sections of the line not equipped with overhead wire.

The first Brookville-built streetcar was delivered in September 2016, with the last two of the six cars delivered in March 2017. The last car of Detroit's previous streetcar system was numbered 286, so it was decided to number the new cars 287-292, to pick up where the old number series had left off.

== Operation ==
=== Route ===
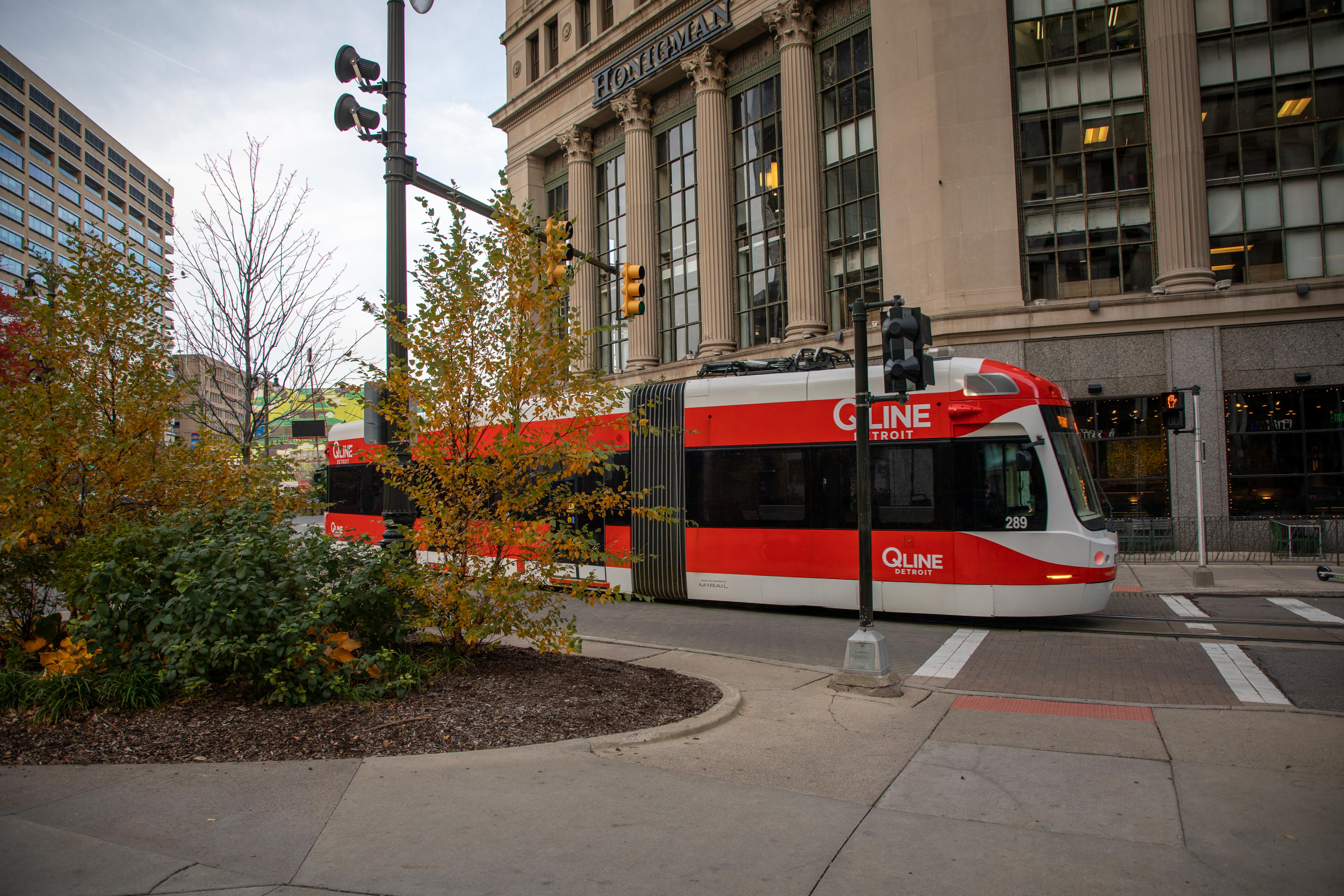
QLine near Campus Martius downtown Detroit 2021

The QLine traverses Woodward Avenue in its entirety from downtown through Midtown to New Center. The line begins at the southern terminus at Congress Street in the median before tracks swing to the curbside for most of its length. (Some parts of the line have tracks running down the middle travel lane of Woodward in downtown.) After traveling in the curbside travel lane, the line swings back into the inside travel lane (median) at Amsterdam all the way to the line's northern terminus at Grand Boulevard. Non-revenue tracks continue two blocks to the M-1 Rail Penske Tech Center, which serves as headquarters for the QLine and the garage for the streetcars. In September 2021, the southbound curb lane from Temple Street to I-75 was converted to a transit-only lane to be used by the QLine, DDOT and SMART to increase headways.

=== List of stations ===
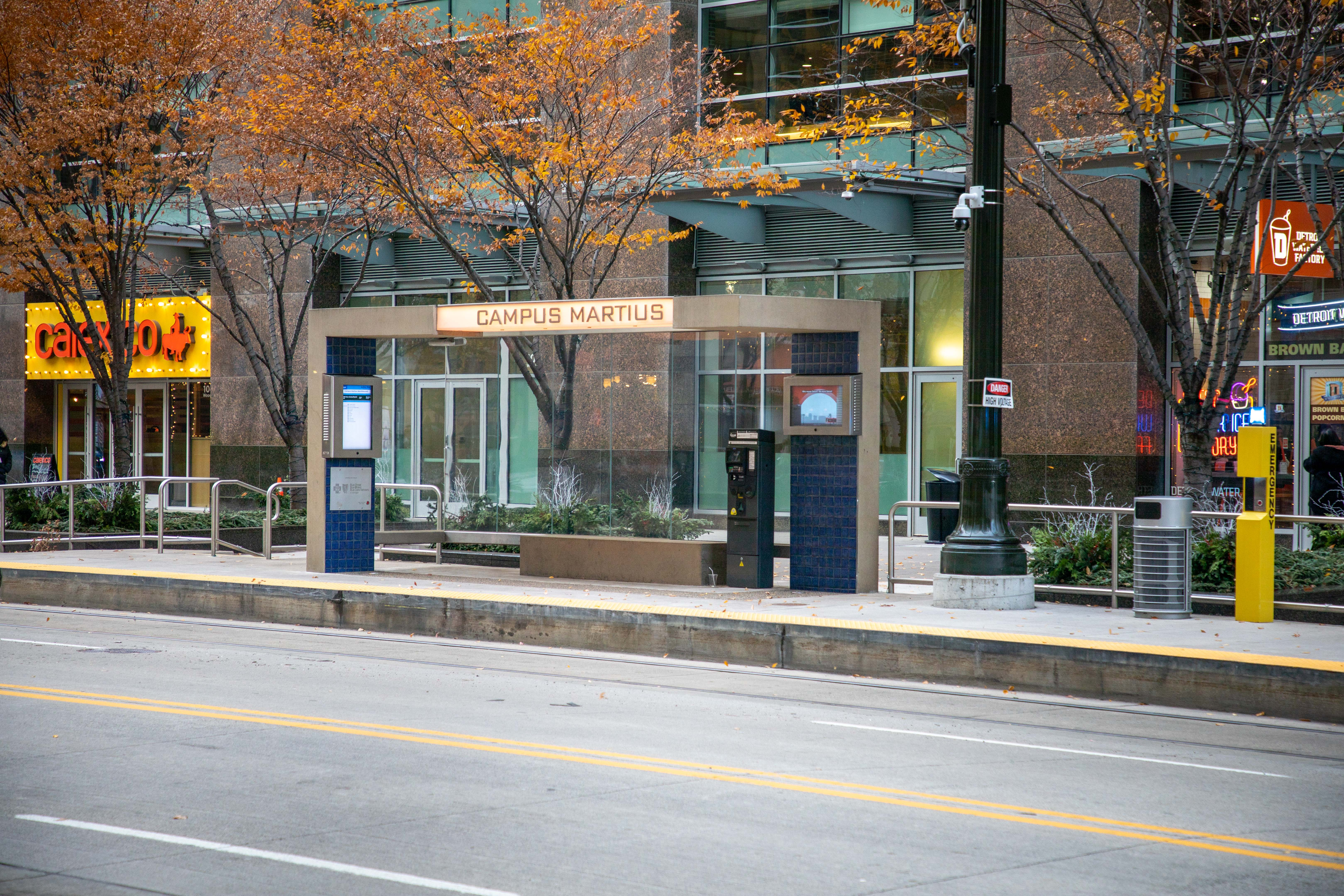
Campus Martius station in 2021

Stop	Neighborhood(s)	Connections
Congress Street	Downtown, Financial District	Detroit People Mover (at Financial District); DDOT 3, 4, 5, 6, 9, 40, 52, 67; SMART 261, 255, 461/462, 530, 563, 620, 635, 805, 830, 851
Campus Martius	Downtown	DDOT 4
Grand Circus	Downtown, Grand Circus Park	Detroit People Mover; DDOT 4; SMART 261, 461/462, 500
Montcalm Street	Downtown, Foxtown	DDOT 4
Sproat Street/Adelaide Street	Midtown, Brush Park, Cass Park	DDOT 4; SMART 461/462, 500
MLK Boulevard/Mack Avenue	Midtown, Brush Park, Cass Corridor	DDOT 4, 31, 42, 47; SMART 461/462
Canfield Street	Midtown, Medical Center	DDOT 4
Warren Avenue	Midtown, Cultural Center, WSU	DDOT 4, 8; SMART 461/462, 562, 851
Ferry Street	Midtown, Cultural Center, East Ferry	DDOT 4; SMART 851
Amsterdam Street	New Center	DDOT 4
Baltimore Street	New Center	Amtrak; DDOT 4; SMART 461/462, 500, 851
Grand Boulevard	New Center	DDOT 4; SMART 500, 851

=== Headways and operational span ===
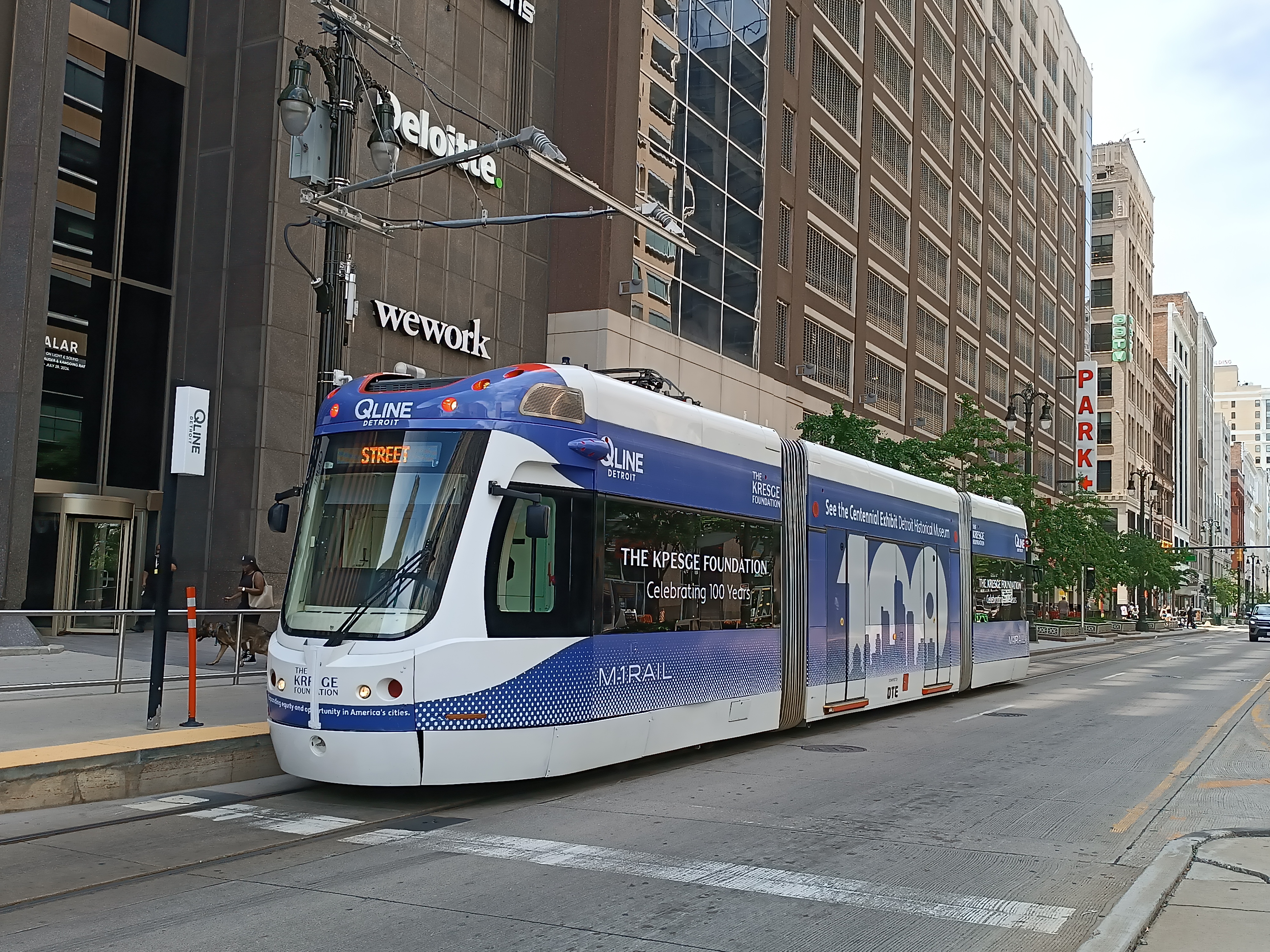
A tram stopped at Campus Martius in 2024.

The QLine generally operates four trains at a time, with trains arriving every 15 minutes or less. Service runs seven days a week, beginning at 8 a.m. daily: trains run through midnight Monday-Saturday, and through 9 p.m. on Sundays.

=== Fares ===
There is currently no charge to ride the QLine, as its operations are supported by a subsidy from the State of Michigan. The system's original fare, instituted in September 2017, was $1.50; it was raised to $2 in October 2019, when the QLine joined the Dart payment system used by SMART and DDOT.

=== Towing ===
M-1 Rail is a licensed towing operator. State legislation permits the agency to tow parked vehicles which block its tracks; vehicles are taken to City of Detroit-owned impound lots. Towing operations began in June 2022, when a Florida towing company donated a truck to M-1 Rail.

== See also ==
- Light rail in the United States
- List of streetcar systems in the United States
- Streetcars in North America
- Transportation in metropolitan Detroit
