= Brookville, Nova Scotia =

Community in Nova Scotia, Canada

Brookville
- Location within Nova Scotia
- Coordinates: 45°24′23″N 64°35′40″W
- Country: Canada
- Province: Nova Scotia
- Municipality: Cumberland County
- Time zone: UTC-4 (AST)
- Postal code: B
- Area code: 902
- Telephone Exchange: 216 254 728
- NTS Map: 021H07
- GNBC Code: CAFGF
- Part of a series about Places in Nova Scotia

Brookville is a rural community in the Canadian province of Nova Scotia, located in Cumberland County.
