= Brookville Township, Illinois =

Brookville Township
- Township
- Location in Ogle County
- Coordinates: 42°04′17″N 89°39′10″W
- Country: United States
- State: Illinois
- County: Ogle
- Established: November 6, 1849

Government
  - Supervisor: Aileen Diehl

Area
  - Total: 18.07 sq mi (46.8 km^{2})
  - Land: 18.07 sq mi (46.8 km^{2})
  - Water: 0 sq mi (0 km^{2}) 0%
- Elevation: 791 ft (241 m)

Population (2010)
  - Estimate (2016): 231
  - Density: 13.3/sq mi (5.1/km^{2})
- Time zone: UTC-6 (CST)
  - Summer (DST): UTC-5 (CDT)
- ZIP codes: 61030, 61064, 61078
- FIPS code: 17-141-08784

Brookville Township is one of twenty-four townships in Ogle County, Illinois, USA. As of the 2010 census, its population was 241 and it contained 117 housing units.

== History ==
Brookville Township was one of the original twenty townships that were created when township government was adopted by the county; these townships were defined on February 5, 1850.

== Geography ==
According to the 2010 census, the township has a total area of 18.07 square miles (46.8 km^{2}), all land. It contains the unincorporated town of Brookville and the cemeteries of Brookville Township and Chambers Grove.

== Demographics ==
Historical population
Census	Pop.	Note	%±
2016 (est.)	231
U.S. Decennial Census

== School districts ==
- Forrestville Valley Community Unit School District 221
- Polo Community Unit School District 222

== Political districts ==
- Illinois's 16th congressional district
- State House District 89
- State Senate District 45
