= Brookville Equipment =

Rolling stock manufacturer

Brookville Equipment Corporation
- Type: Private
- Industry: Rail transport
- Founded: 1918
- Founder: L. A. Leathers
- Headquarters: Brookville, Pennsylvania, United States
- Key people: Rick Graham (President)
- Products: underground haulage equipment, locomotives and mass transit applications
- Number of employees: approx. 300 (2012)
- Website: www.brookvillecorp.com/

Brookville Equipment Corporation, based in Brookville, Pennsylvania, United States, manufactures railroad locomotives for industrial and light capacity switching needs. The company also builds and restores streetcars. The company was formerly known as the Brookville Locomotive Company.

== History ==
The company began in 1918 by installing flanged railroad wheels on Ford trucks (Road–rail vehicle). The company soon began building gasoline-powered locomotives of their own following World War I. Brookville's locomotives were the first to include planetary drive axles rather than chain drives.

== Products ==
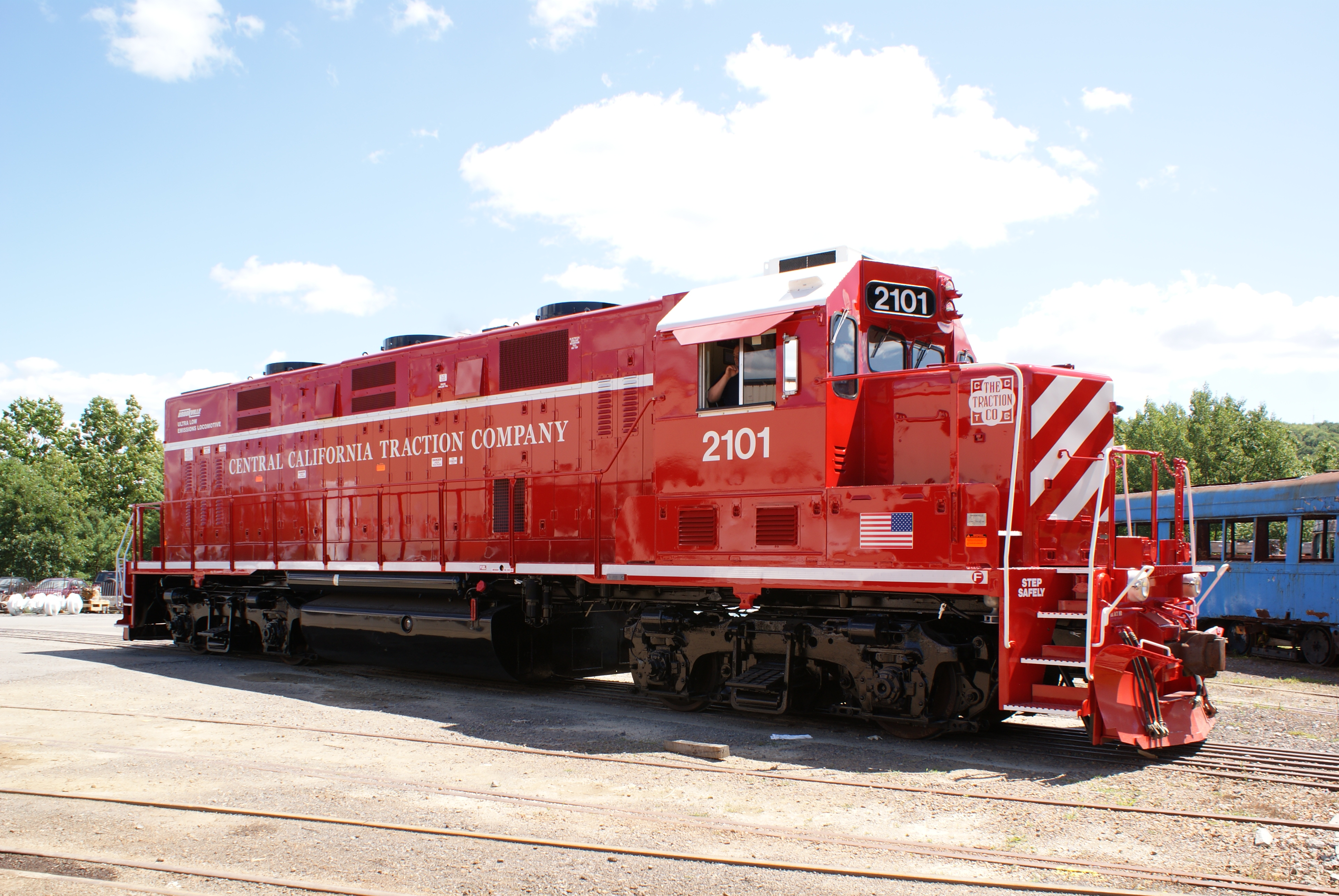
Brookville locomotive for the Central California Traction Company

In 2007, BEC unveiled its CoGeneration locomotives with up to 2,100 horsepower (1,600 kW), generated through the use of three low-emission diesel engines. The use of three clean-burning EPA Tier-3 engines offers a "Power on Demand" feature where engines come on-line as power needs are realized. This feature reduces emissions and fuel consumption. Individual water-cooled IGBT electronic switches for each traction motor improves rail adhesion.

Brookville manufactures equipment used in mining, tunneling, and industrial and switching applications. In 2008, Brookville built its first road switchers for the Metro-North Railroad. The locomotives are given the model designation of BL20-GH.

BEC's Railwalker re-railing devices can also put its locomotives back on-track without the risk of injury to the operator.

=== Streetcars ===
The company began manufacturing trucks for streetcars in 2003 – for use in vintage-style cars being newly built by the New Orleans Regional Transit Authority – and since 2002 it has had a streetcar division, working mainly on restoration, refurbishment and remanufacturing of existing streetcars. The first such contract was one to rebuild 18 PCC streetcars for SEPTA Route 15 in Philadelphia. The cars, known as PCC IIs, entered service in 2005. Later work has included restoring PCC cars for use on San Francisco Municipal Railway's F Market & Wharves line and manufacturing replicas of 1923 Perley Thomas streetcars for New Orleans.

On September 14, 2011, Brookville announced plans to develop a low-floor, articulated tram. The design was later named the "Liberty" model, and features the ability to operate away from the overhead electric power wires for a limited distance, using batteries. In early 2013, the company received a $9.4-million order for two Liberty streetcars from Dallas Area Rapid Transit. They are for Dallas's new Dallas Streetcar, which opened for public service on April 13, 2015. The company also built a pair of replica "Red Car Trolley" streetcars for Disney California Adventure in 2012.

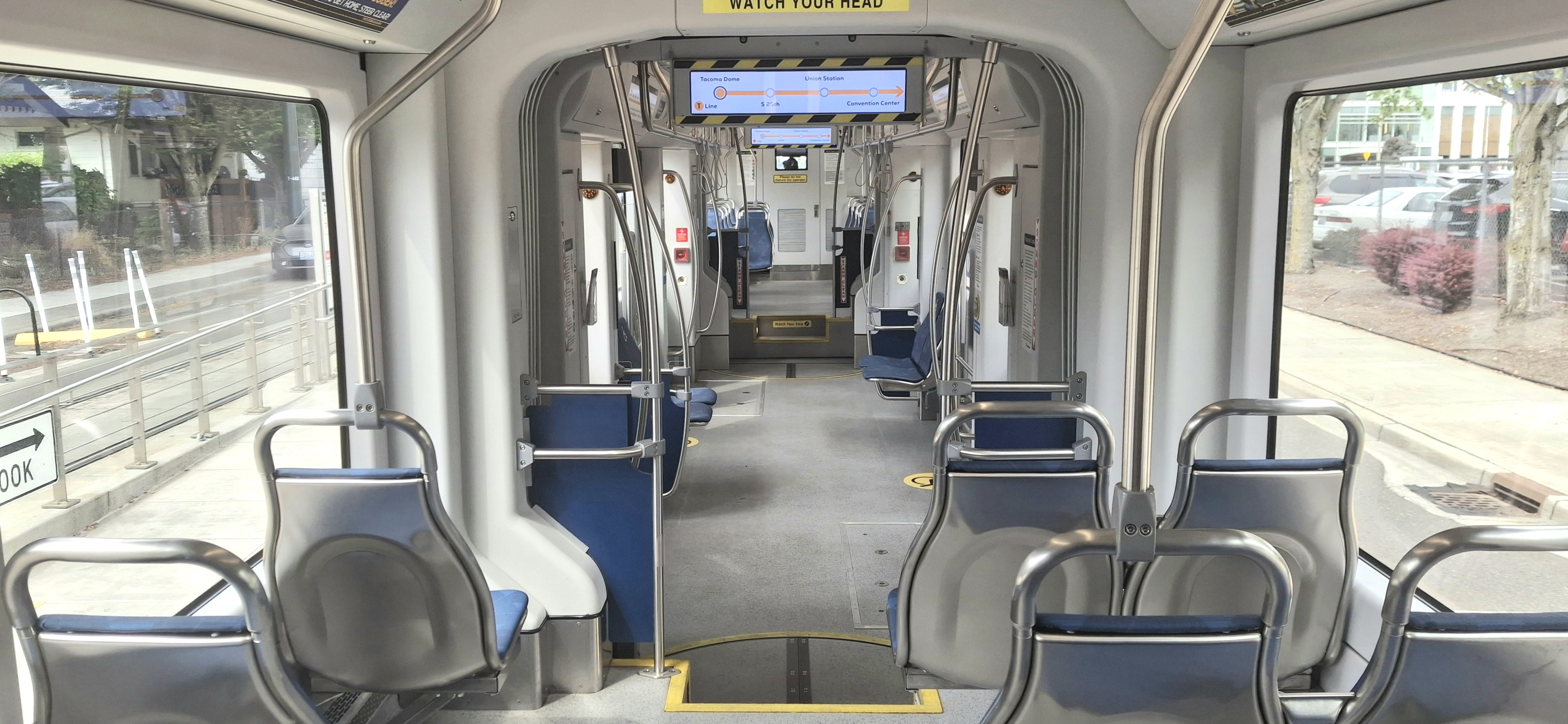
The inside of a Brookville Liberty streetcar

=== Recent rail products ===
==== 2008 ====
Metro-North Railroad ordered 10 BL20GH units, numbers 110-115 in Metro North paint and numbers 125-130 ordered for Connecticut Department of Transportation, painted in New Haven scheme. The order also includes two multi-engine CoGeneration locomotives for MTA Capital and four (115ton) locomotives for the Staten Island Railway. The SIR locomotives are known as BL20G. After their overhaul beginning from 2020, the ConnDOT units were repainted into the CTrail scheme.

==== 2010 ====
Brookville was involved in the building of a low-emissions genset locomotive for the Buffalo and Pittsburgh Railroad that was commissioned in July 2010. The single locomotive was built through a partnership with several local and federal agencies, as well as the railroad and BEC. A second genset was produced for the Buffalo and Pittsburgh, which entered service on December 10, 2010, as well as one for the Ohio Central Railroad, both of which contained an engine kit from Brookville.

==== 2011 ====
Tri-Rail, a commuter rail line in Miami, ordered 12 BL36PH passenger locomotives from Brookville on February 25, 2011, at a cost of $109 million.

==== 2013 ====
Dallas Area Rapid Transit (DART) ordered two Liberty streetcars, with options for two more at a cost of up to $9.4 million, for operations on Dallas' streetcar line.

==== 2015 ====
In March, the first of the two DART streetcars was delivered. In April, two 1,200 horsepower (900 kW) BL12CG genset locomotives were delivered to the Central California Traction Company. In June, the M-1 Rail Line in Detroit, Michigan ordered six streetcars at a purchase price of $32 million. The M-1 cars are equipped with rechargeable lithium-ion batteries and will run on battery power over 60% of the line. In November, Brookville was awarded an $18.6 million contract by the city of Milwaukee for four streetcars for service on the Milwaukee Streetcar, with deliveries planned to begin in late 2017.

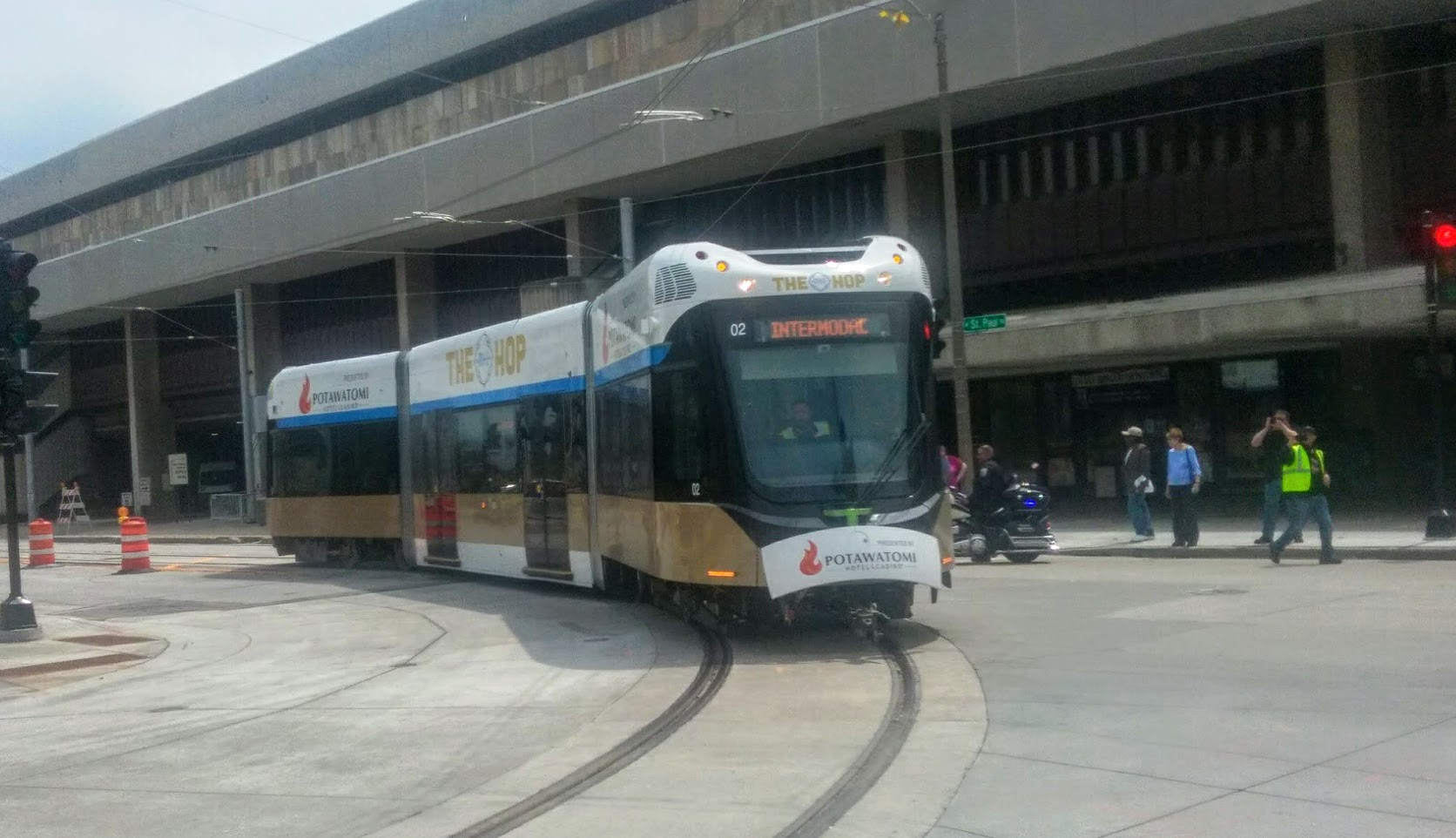
A Brookville Liberty model streetcar for the Milwaukee Streetcar

==== 2016 ====
In March, the Oklahoma City Streetcar ordered five streetcars, with an option for a sixth, at a cost of $24.9 million.

==== 2017 ====
In June, Valley Metro ordered six off-wire capable Liberty Streetcars for the Tempe Streetcar, at a cost of $33 million. El Paso commissioned the restoration of six PCCs for use on the El Paso Streetcar lines.

== See also ==
- List of locomotive builders
- List of low emissions locomotives
- List of tram builders
