= Brookville Liberty Modern Streetcar =

Streetcar

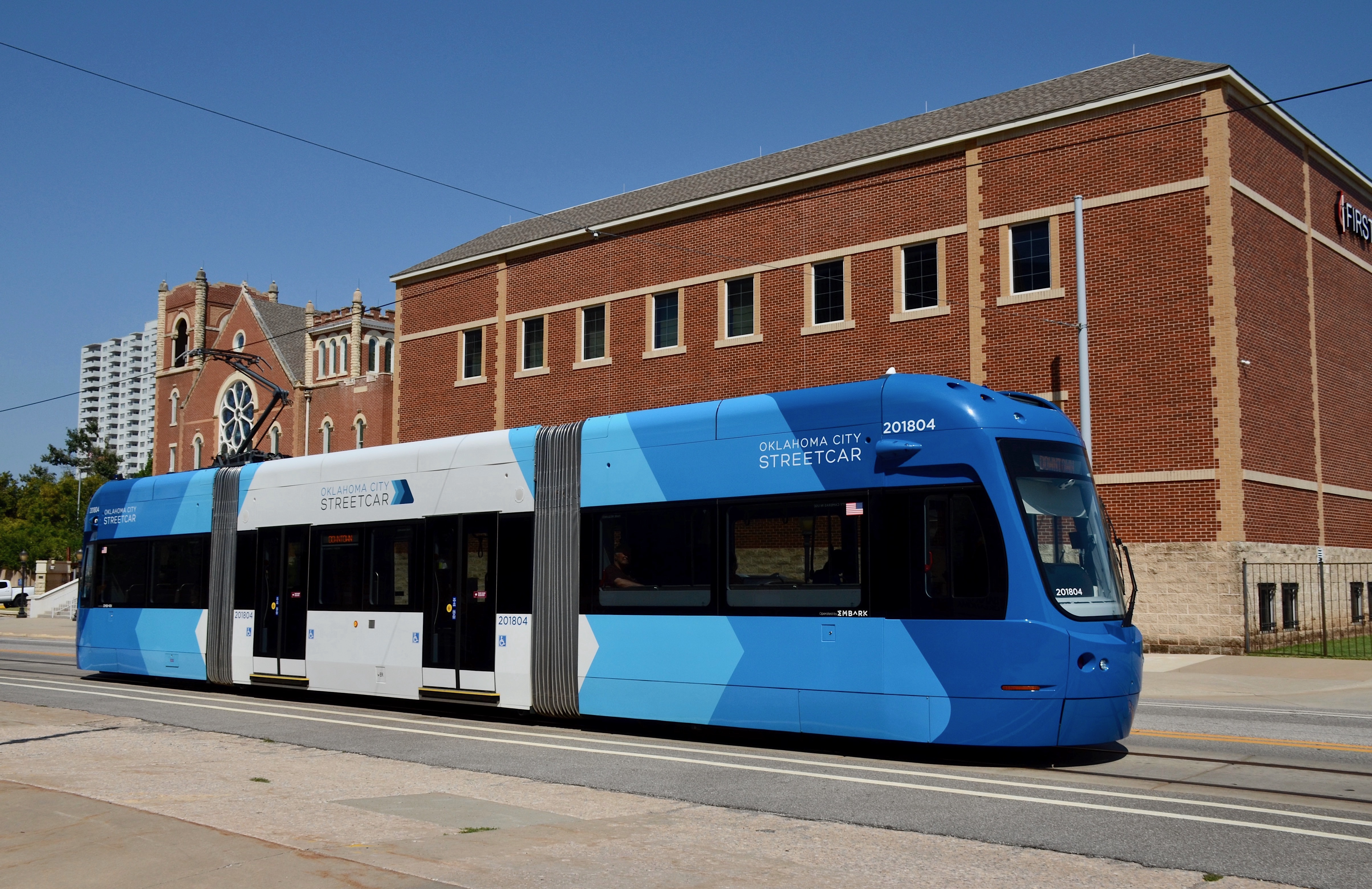
- A Brookville Liberty Modern Streetcar on the Oklahoma City Streetcar system

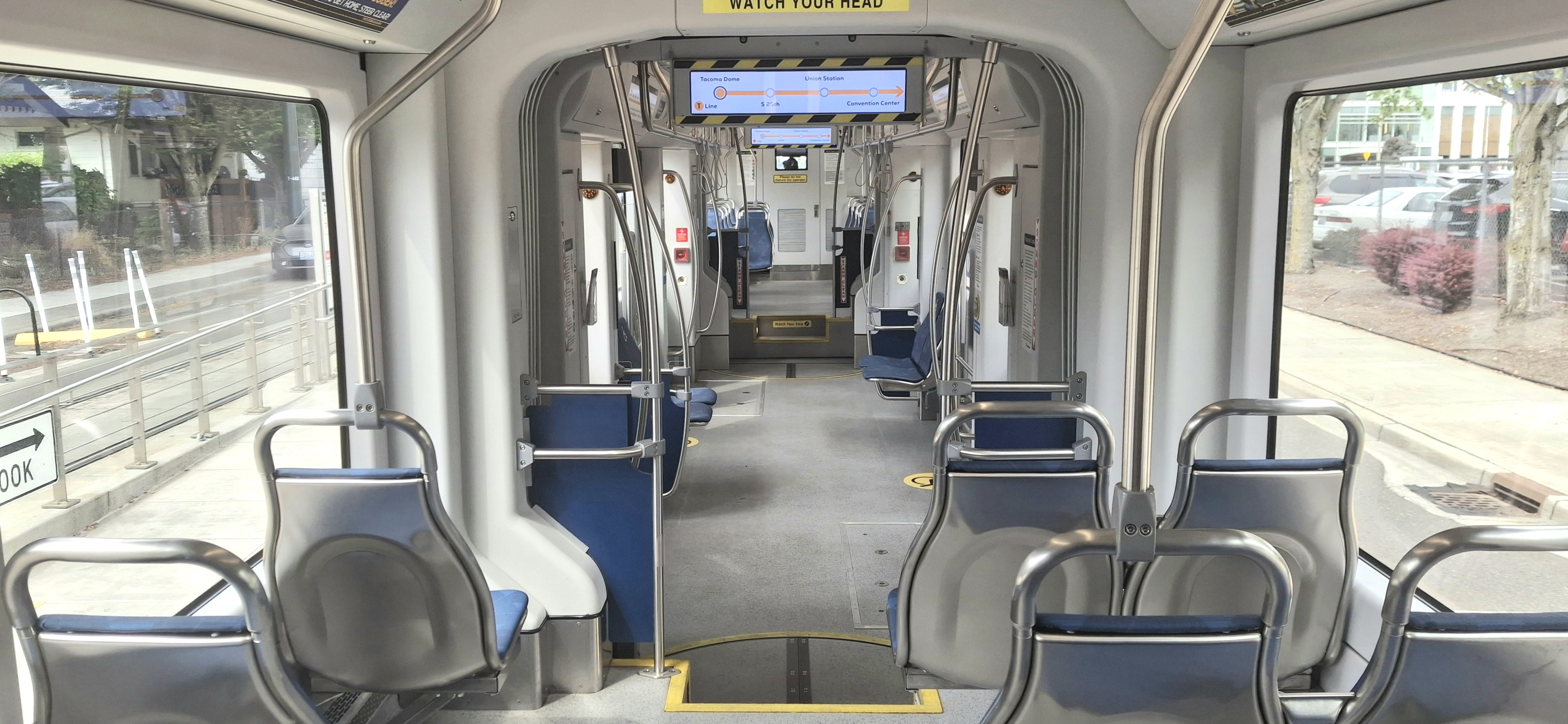
- The inside of a Link Light Rail streetcar
- Stock type: Tram
- Manufacturer: Brookville Equipment Corporation
- Built at: Brookville, Pennsylvania
- Constructed: 2012–present
- Entered service: 2015–present
- Number under construction: 12
- Number built: 28
- Number in service: 22
- Capacity: 32 passengers (seated), 125 to 150 (total)
- Operator: U.S. streetcar operators (see table)

Specifications
- Car length: 66 ft 6 in (20.27 m)
- Floor height: 13 3/4 in (349.25 mm) (low-floor section)
- Doors: 2 per side
- Articulated sections: 3 (two articulations)
- Maximum speed: 35–44 mph (56–71 km/h)
- Traction system: ABB BORDLINE CC400 2-level IGBT–VVVF
- Traction motors: 4 × TSA TMR 34-25-4 130 hp (100 kW) 3-phase AC induction motor
- Power output: 540 hp (400 kW)
- Acceleration: 3 mph/s (1.3 m/s^{2})
- Deceleration: 3 mph/s (1.3 m/s^{2}) (service); 5 mph/s (2.2 m/s^{2}) (emergency)
- Electric systems: Overhead line: 750 V DC; Battery (OESS)
- Current collection: Pantograph
- UIC classification: Bo′+0′+Bo′
- AAR wheel arrangement: B-B
- Track gauge: 4 ft 8 1/2 in (1,435 mm) standard gauge

The Brookville Liberty Modern Streetcar is a streetcar built by Brookville Equipment Corporation since 2012. It is manufactured at Brookville's plant in Pennsylvania.

The streetcar is currently in use in the Dallas, Detroit, Milwaukee, Oklahoma City, Tempe, Tacoma, and Portland streetcar systems.

== Design ==
The Brookville Liberty Modern Streetcar is equipped with 750 V DC onboard battery packs made up of rechargeable lithium-ion batteries, referred to as an onboard energy storage system (OESS), that enable it to operate off-wire. It is the first electric streetcar built in the United States capable of operating off-wire. Brookville president Marion Van Fosson referred to it as "the Prius of the modern streetcar market" due to its hybrid design that allows it to run on either battery power or via pantograph and catenary wires.

The streetcar is a 70% low-floor design that measures 66.5 feet (20.27 m) in length and can seat 32 passengers; it is also capable of accommodating between 125 and 150 people while fully loaded. Empty, each car weighs 79,000 pounds (35,800 kg). The streetcar rides on Brookville's Soft-Ride trucks on standard-gauge track, and can reach a top speed of 35 to 44 miles per hour (56 to 71 km/h). The streetcar's loading gauge varies between 96 inches (2,438 mm) in Dallas's system, and 104 inches (2,642 mm) in the Detroit and Milwaukee systems

In 2020, Brookville introduced a new version, named Liberty NXT, with a redesigned carbody among other changes. Production of the first units began that year and delivery of the first completed NXT cars began in 2021, to the Tempe Streetcar.

== Orders and deliveries ==
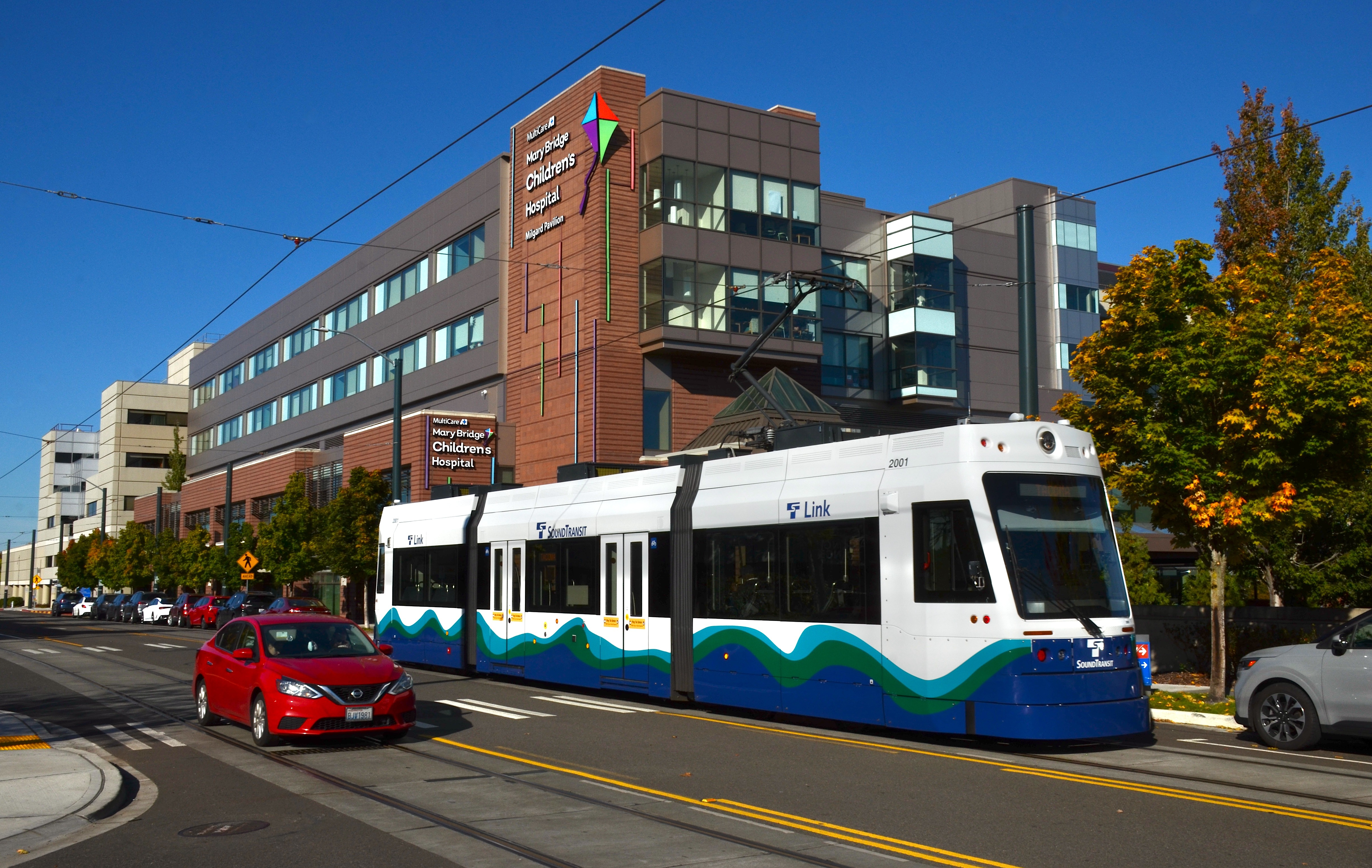
The redesigned, NXT version in service on Tacoma's T Line (2023).

=== Dallas Area Rapid Transit (DART) Streetcar ===
In February 2013, Brookville signed a US$9.4 million contract with Dallas Area Rapid Transit (DART) in Dallas for two Liberty Modern Streetcars to operate its Dallas Streetcar service between Union Station and Oak Cliff, making it the "first-ever American designed and manufactured off-wire capable streetcar to be delivered to a U.S. public transit agency". DART took delivery of its first Brookville streetcar in March 2015.

=== Detroit — QLine ===
In June 2015, Brookville signed a contract with M-1 RAIL (later renamed the QLine) in Detroit to sell six Liberty Modern Streetcars for $32 million, its second order for the streetcars. On the Detroit line, the streetcars operate off-wire 60% of the time. The first two cars were scheduled for a late 2016 delivery in anticipation of the line's opening in spring 2017, and were followed by four more deliveries by spring 2017.

=== Milwaukee — The Hop ===
In November 2015, Milwaukee signed a four-car, US$18.6-million contract with Brookville for its Lakefront Line of the city's light rail system, "The Hop". This was the third order for the streetcars. Milwaukee's cars feature bicycle racks as well as a climate-control system "adapted to meet the needs of Milwaukee's climate".

Delivery of the streetcars had been expected to begin in mid- to late 2017, with all four cars being delivered by early 2018. The first streetcar vehicles were delivered the week of March 26, 2018 (8 years ago).

=== Oklahoma City Streetcar ===
In March 2016, Oklahoma City reached a final agreement with Brookville to purchase five streetcars, with an option for a sixth, at a cost of $24.9 million for its Oklahoma City Streetcar.

=== Tempe Streetcar ===
In 2017, Brookville was awarded a $33 million contract to deliver six Liberty Streetcars for use on the forthcoming Tempe Streetcar and a $26.5 million contract from Sound Transit for five streetcars to be operated on the Tacoma Link line.

=== Portland Streetcar ===
In March 2018, Brookville secured the sale of two Liberty Modern Streetcars to Portland Streetcar, and a third car was added to the order in December of that year. Construction of the three Portland cars was delayed by factors related to the COVID-19 pandemic, but all were delivered in 2023, the last in December.

City/Region	System	Image	Design	No. in service	Year ordered	Year operating
Dallas	Dallas Streetcar			4	2013	2015
Detroit	QLine			6	2015	2017
Milwaukee	The Hop			5	2015	2018
Oklahoma City	Oklahoma City Streetcar			7	2016	2018
Tempe	S Line		NXT	6	2017	2022
Tacoma	T Line		NXT	5	2017	2023
Portland	Portland Streetcar		NXT	3	2018	2025

== Accolades ==
In October 2015, the Liberty Modern Streetcar won the Technical Innovation of the Year award at the Light Rail Transit Association's Global Light Rail Awards in London.

== See also ==
- Streetcars in North America
