= Illinois State Park Lodges and Cabins Thematic Resources =

- Illinois State Park Lodges and Cabins MPS
- U.S. National Register of Historic Places
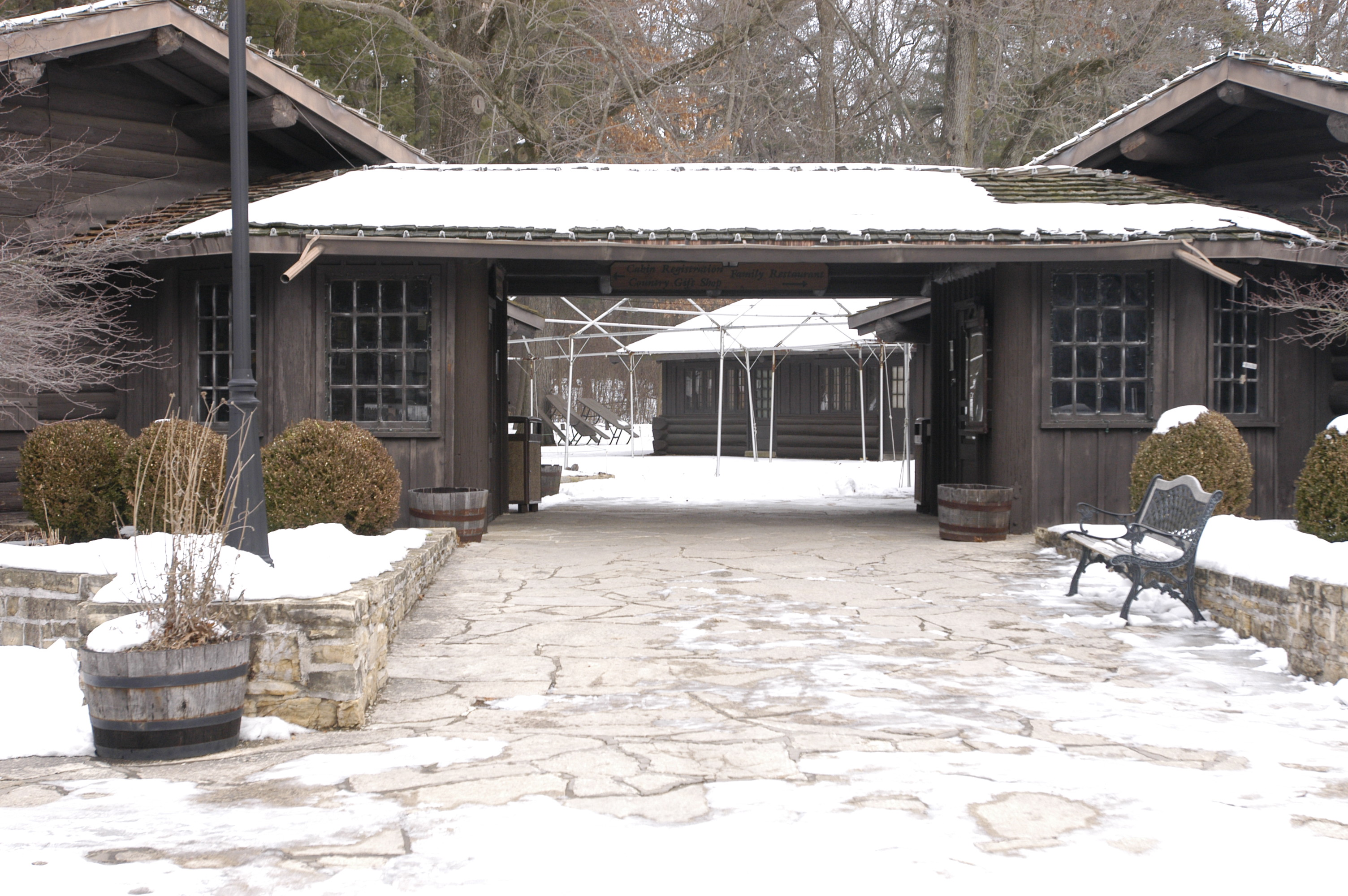
- The covered breezeway between the two buildings of the smallest of the lodges, at White Pines Forest State Park.
- Location: Illinois, USA
- Built: 1933-1942
- Architect: Joseph F. Booten
- Architectural style: Vernacular
- MPS: MPL012 - Illinois State Park Lodges and Cabins Thematic Resources
- NRHP reference No.: 85002402 - 85002405 and 85002702 (For Starved Rock)
- Added to NRHP: March 4, 1985 and May 8, 1985 (For Starved Rock)

Illinois State Park Lodges and Cabins Thematic Resources is a Multiple Property Submission on the National Register of Historic Places in the U.S. state of Illinois. The listing includes the lodge and cabin sites in five different Illinois State Parks.

== Lodges ==
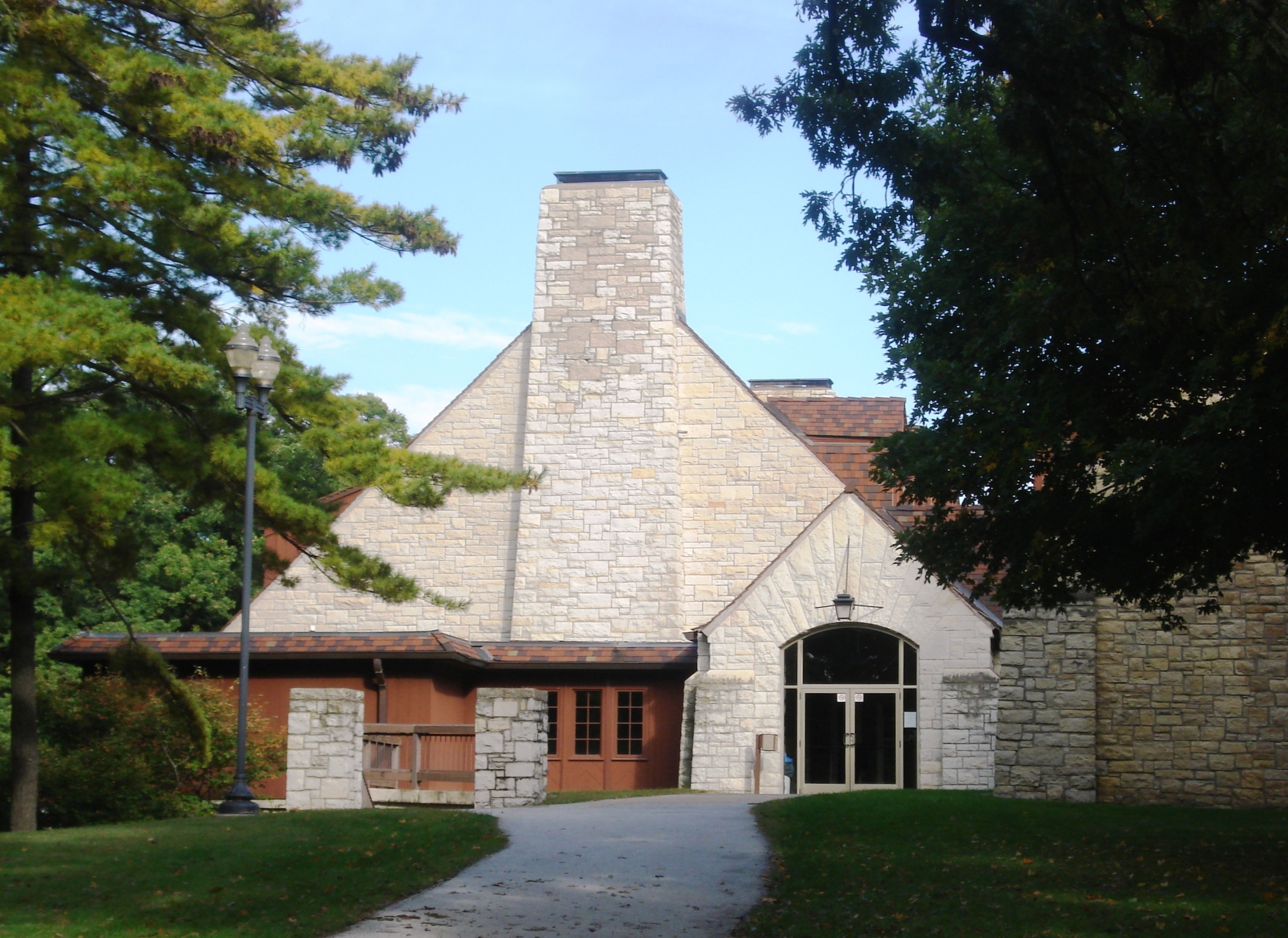
Watch Tower Lodge at Blawk Hawk State Historic Site

The lodges are the largest buildings on each of the sites. In each case, except for White Pines, the lodge is a large two story structure. The two stories encompass the lounge, each lodge's focal point with large stone fireplaces and exposed log rafters. Though White Pines State Park Lodge is much smaller than the other four it still features the focal point lounge, fireplace and open truss systems displayed at the other sites. The lounge is designed to be an area of relaxing recreation and conversation. This use is reflected in the lodges' specially made furniture which is arranged in patterns meant to encourage such a use. Other features common to all the lodges are restaurants, toilets and showers, meeting rooms and souvenir stands. The Watch Tower Lodge at Black Hawk State Historic Site includes two museums. The Hauberg Indian Museum and a Civilian Conservation Corps museum. Besides Watch Tower and White Pines, this Multiple Property Submission included Starved Rock Lodge and Cabins, Pere Marquette Lodge and Cabins and Giant City State Park Lodge and Cabins.

== History ==
The Illinois State Park system grew slowly at first. Fort Massac was the state's first park, in 1903. After that, additions were sporadic. Starved Rock State Park was added in 1911 and remained, by far, the largest of Illinois' State Parks until the 1930s. In 1917 Illinois Governor Frank Lowden instituted major reforms in government which gave the governor direct control of state departments through a director who sat on a cabinet. Though many of the 1917 reforms, including one that authorized a governor-appointed Board of State Park Advisors, were not instituted until later a 1925 state law helped the State Park system grow.

The 1925 state law, which was later amended in 1931, gave the director of the Illinois Department of Public Works jurisdiction over the state parks. The Public Works position was one of Lowden's 1917 reforms that had already gone into effect. The law also mandated a system of state parks, under the Illinois Department of Conservation, later renamed the Illinois Department of Natural Resources. Per the 1925 mandate three of the parks included in the Multiple Property Submission became state parks in 1927, Black Hawk State Historic Site, Giant City State Park and White Pines Forest State Park. White Pines nearly became a state park in 1903, along with Fort Massac, but the $30,000 appropriation for its purchase was subject to a veto by Governor Richard Yates. Pere Marquette State Park was not acquired until May 1932. Known then as Piasa Bluff State Park, the 1,511-acre (611 ha) park was the largest in Illinois at the time.

In 1933 the state park system's development picked up. Under the governorship of Henry Horner the lodge projects at the state parks began. This was thanks in large part to the increase in federal funds thanks to the New Deal and the appointment of Robert Kingery as director of the Public Works Department. Kingery had guided the State Park Board of Advisors through the development of a preservation beginning in 1930. The need for the lodges had been set forth in that 1932 plan that Kingery had helped adopt.
