= Pine Creek (Rock River tributary) =

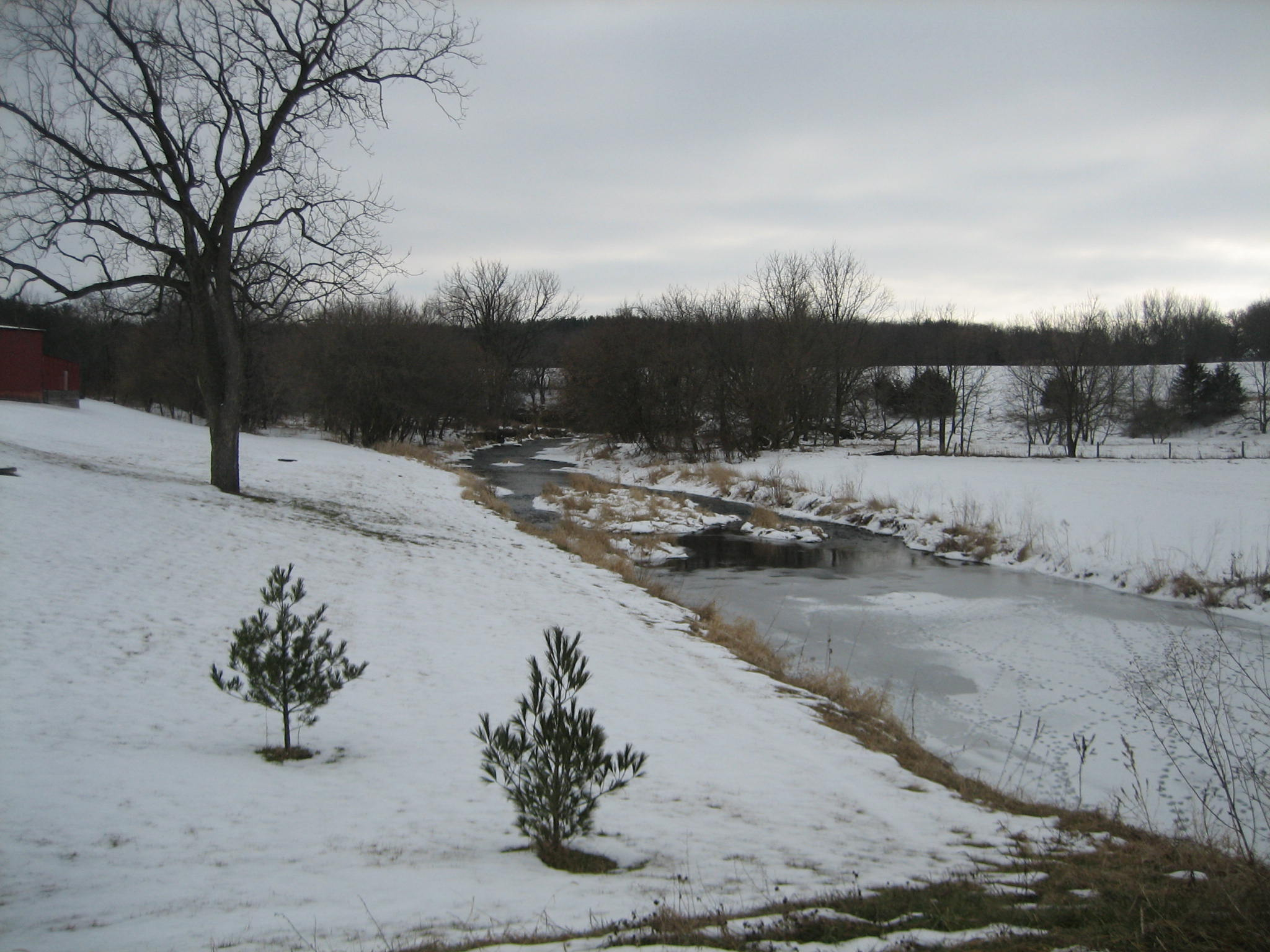
- Pine Creek just downstream from White Pines Forest State Park

Physical characteristics
- Source
  - location: Ogle County north of Mount Morris, Illinois
  - coordinates: 42°05′22″N 89°26′30″W
  - elevation: 916 ft (279 m)
- Mouth
  - location: Confluence with Rock River northwest of Grand Detour, Illinois
  - coordinates: 41°54′48″N 89°26′59″W
  - elevation: 643 ft (196 m)
- Length: 17 mi (27 km)

Basin features
- Progression: Pine Creek → Rock → Mississippi → Gulf of Mexico
- GNIS ID: 415696

Pine Creek is a short tributary of the Rock River that flows through western Ogle County in the U.S. state of Illinois.

== Course ==
Pine Creek rises where several stream branches come together south of Illinois Route 64. The creek then flows 17 miles (27 km) to the south to join the Rock River between Grand Detour and Dixon. The stream's upper miles flow through mostly pasture land until 7 miles downstream Pine Creek enters White Pines Forest State Park.

== State park ==
Beginning a few miles upstream from the park Pine Creek begins winding through glacial ridges and then enters White Pines State Park. For almost a half mile through the park the creek winds through steep valleys and its banks are lined by tall bluffs. The large rock and cliff formations provide habitat to plants ranging from large trees to moss to hanging vines. The cliffs harbor such rare plants as Canada yew and sullivantia (family Saxifragaceae), an Illinois state-threatened species.
