= John Hauberg Museum of Native American Life =

Museum in Illinois, United States

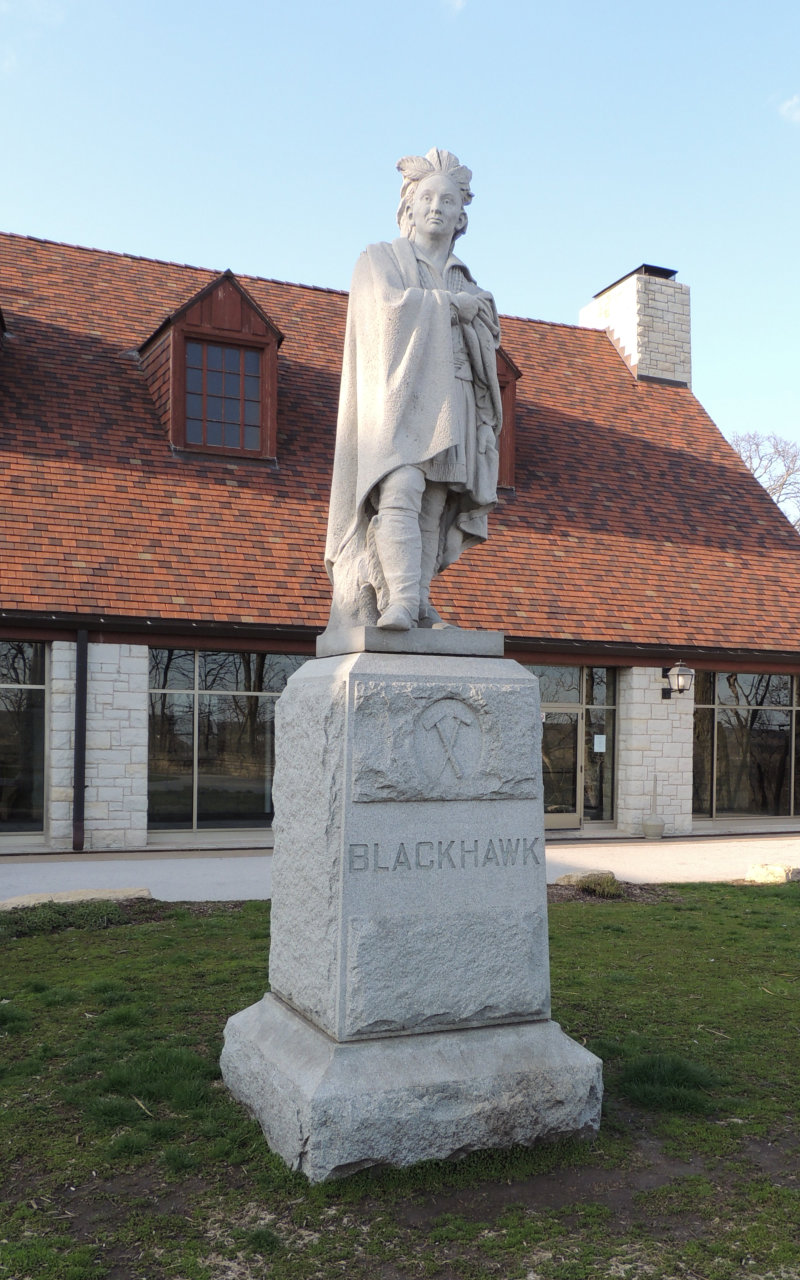
- Statue of Black Hawk outside the museum
- Established: 1939
- Location: Rock Island, Illinois
- Coordinates: 41.464378°N 90.572258°W
- Type: Native American
- Public transit access: Quad Cities MetroLINK
- Website: www.blackhawkpark.org

John Hauberg Museum of Native American Life is located in the Black Hawk Museum and Lodge at Black Hawk State Historic Site in Rock Island, Illinois, United States. The museum is in a historic building that was listed on the National Register of Historic Places in 1985. It is part of the Illinois State Park Lodges and Cabins Thematic Resources.

The park was established in 1927 and the lodge was built in 1934 as a project of the Civilian Conservation Corps. The museum itself opened in the lodge in 1939 with a collection started by Dr. John Hauberg, a Rock Island philanthropist. The museum interprets the story of the Sauk and Meskwaki tribes that lived in the area in a village called the Saukenuk. It was considered one of the largest Native American villages in North America. The collection includes winter and summer houses used by the tribes, and dioramas that depict the lives of the people who lived here from 1750 to 1830. Artifacts include authentic trade goods, jewelry, and domestic items.
