= Black Hawk Museum and Lodge =

- U.S. National Register of Historic Places
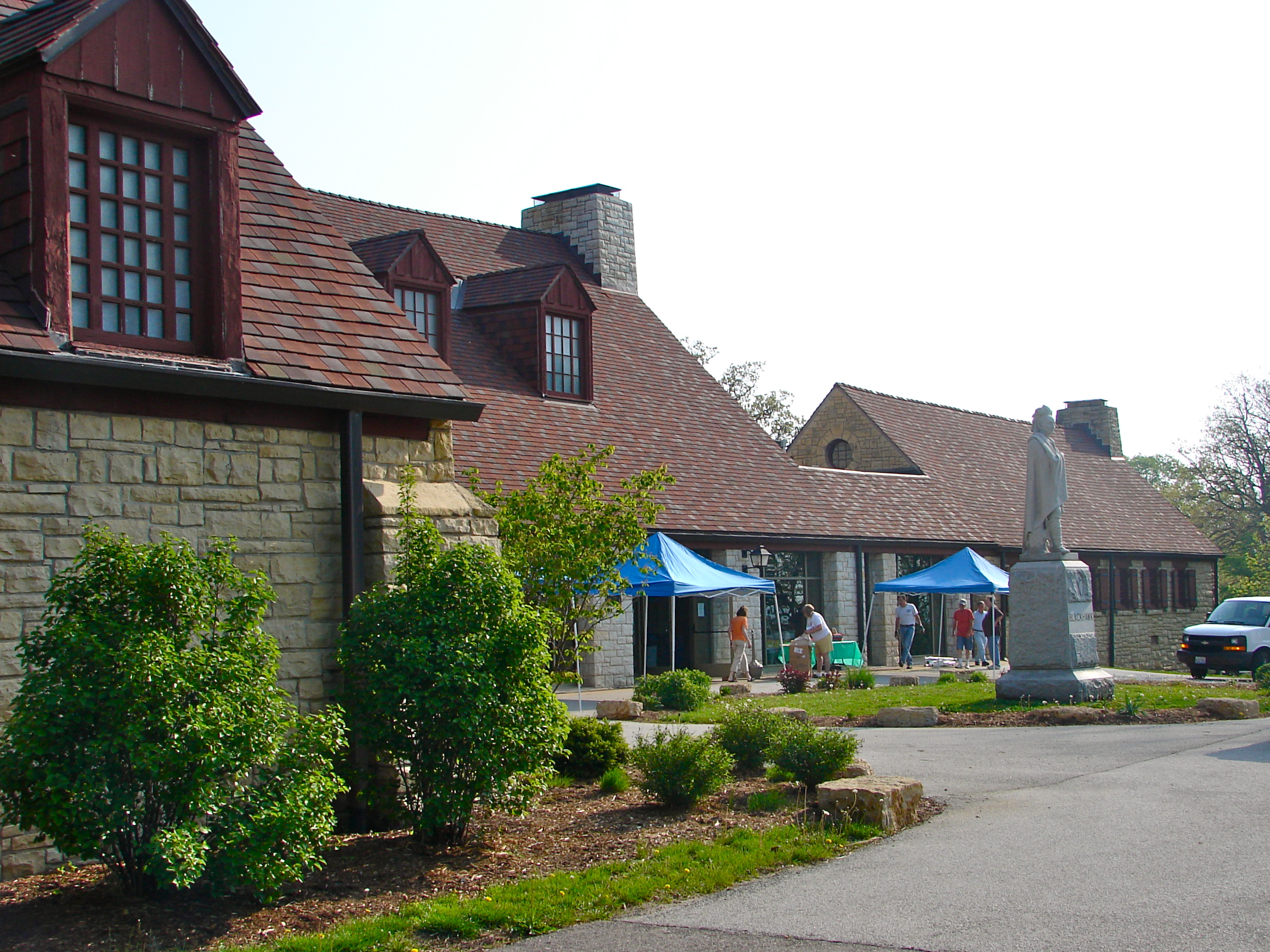

- Location within Illinois Location within the United States
- Location: 1510 46th Ave. Rock Island, Illinois
- Coordinates: 41°27′51″N 90°34′21″W
- Architect: Joseph F. Booton
- Architectural style: Colonial Revival
- MPS: MPL012 - Illinois State Park Lodges and Cabins Thematic Resources
- NRHP reference No.: 85002402
- Added to NRHP: March 4, 1985

Black Hawk Museum and Lodge is a historic building located in the Black Hawk State Historic Site in Rock Island, Illinois, United States. The lodge was listed on the National Register of Historic Places in 1985. It is a part of the Illinois State Park Lodges and Cabins Thematic Resources.

== Black Hawk State Historic Site ==
The Black Hawk State Historic Site was established in 1927 and the lodge was built in 1934 as a project of the Civilian Conservation Corps.

== Hauberg Indian Museum ==
The John Hauberg Museum of Native American Life was opened in the lodge in 1939 with a collection started by Dr. John Hauberg, a Rock Island philanthropist and president of Augustana College. The museum interprets the story of the Sauk and Meskwaki tribes that lived in the area in a village called the Saukenuk. It was considered one of the largest Native American villages in North America. The collection includes winter and summer houses used by the tribes, and dioramas that depict the lives of the people who lived here from 1750 to 1830. Artifacts include authentic trade goods, jewelry and domestic items as well as the 18 tonne sculpture of Black Hawk, created in 1892 by Welsh sculptor David Richards (1829-1897).

== Photo gallery ==
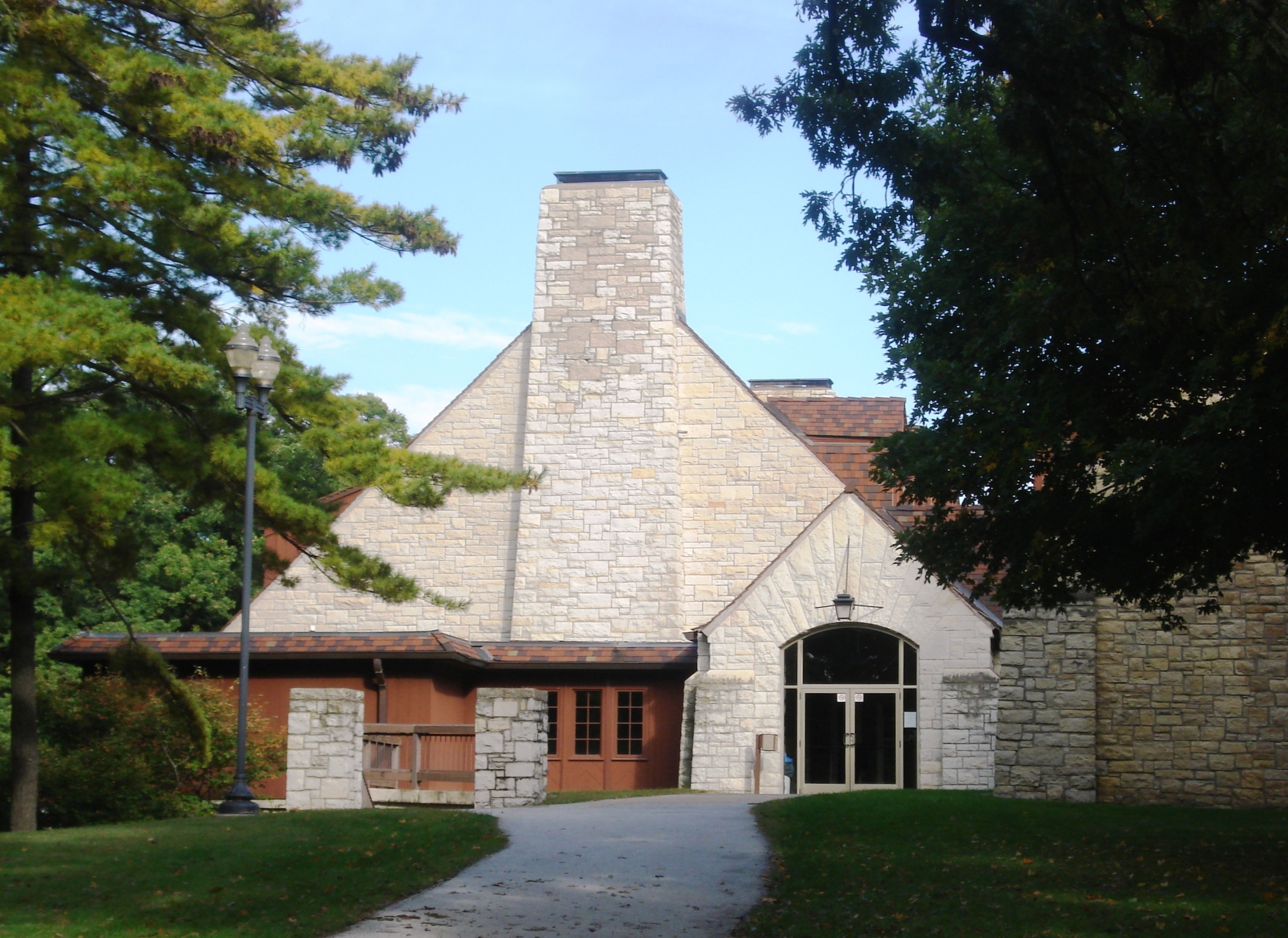
Main entrance to Black Hawk Lodge

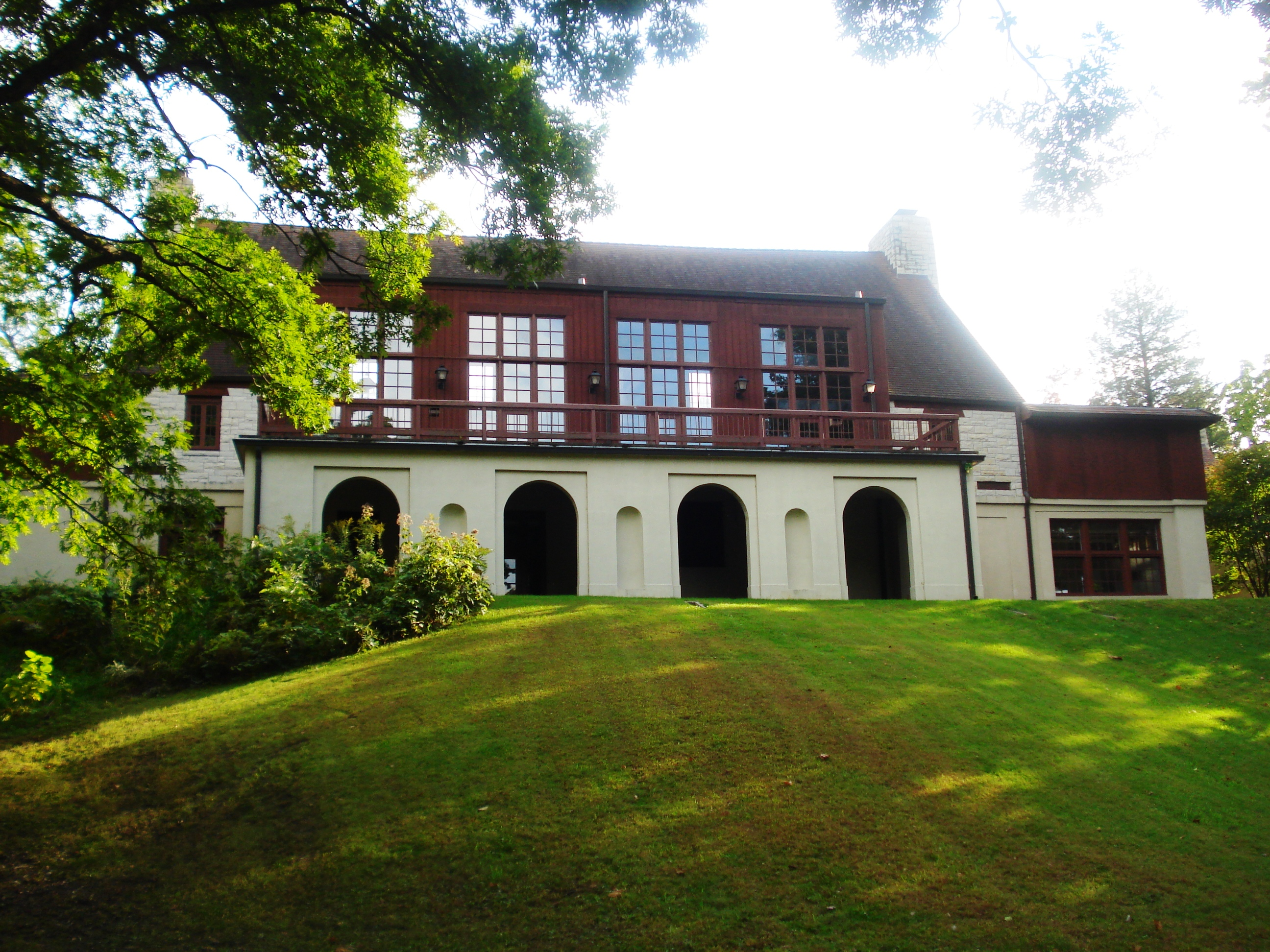
North facade of Black Hawk Lodge

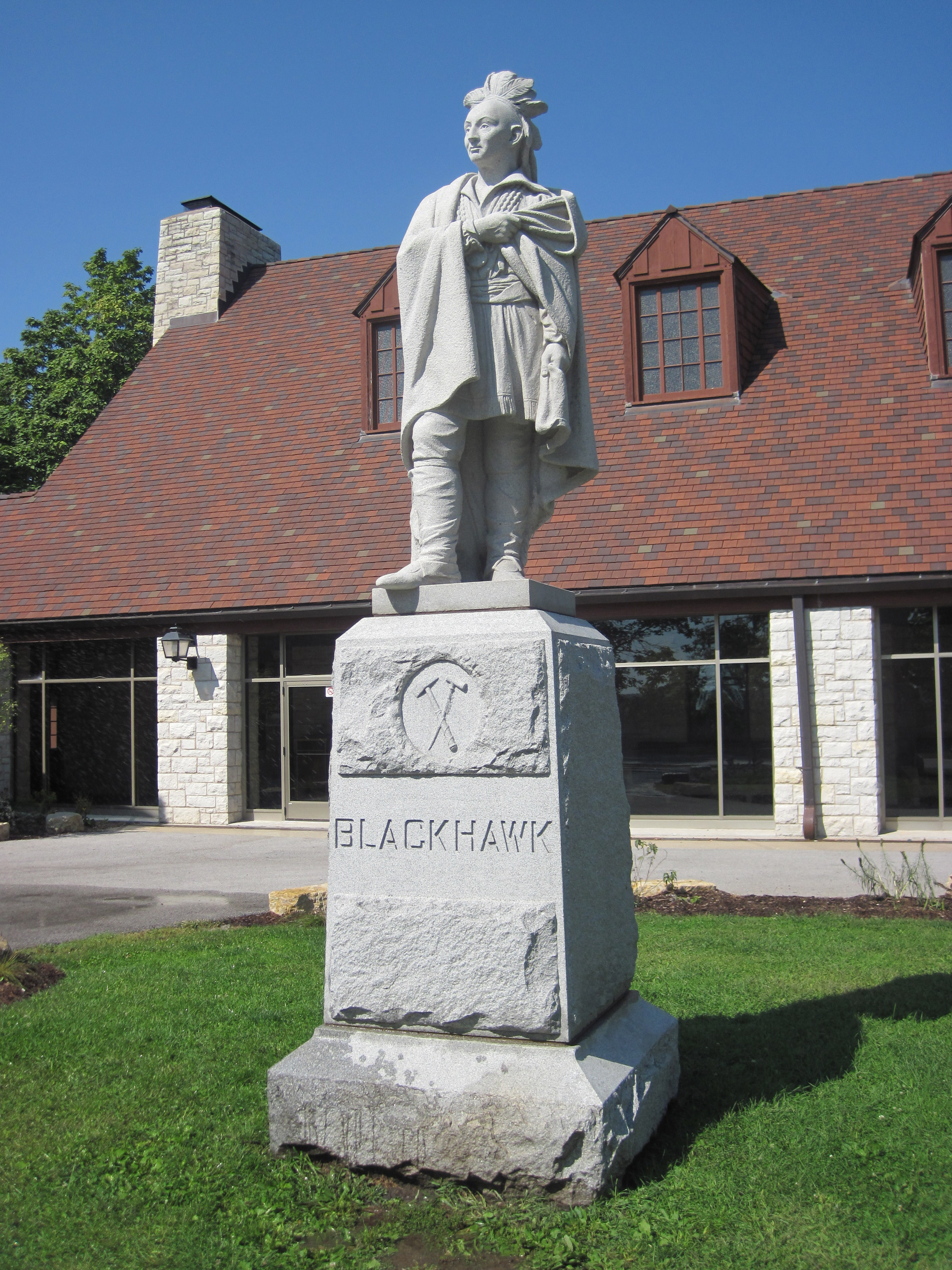
Black Hawk statue

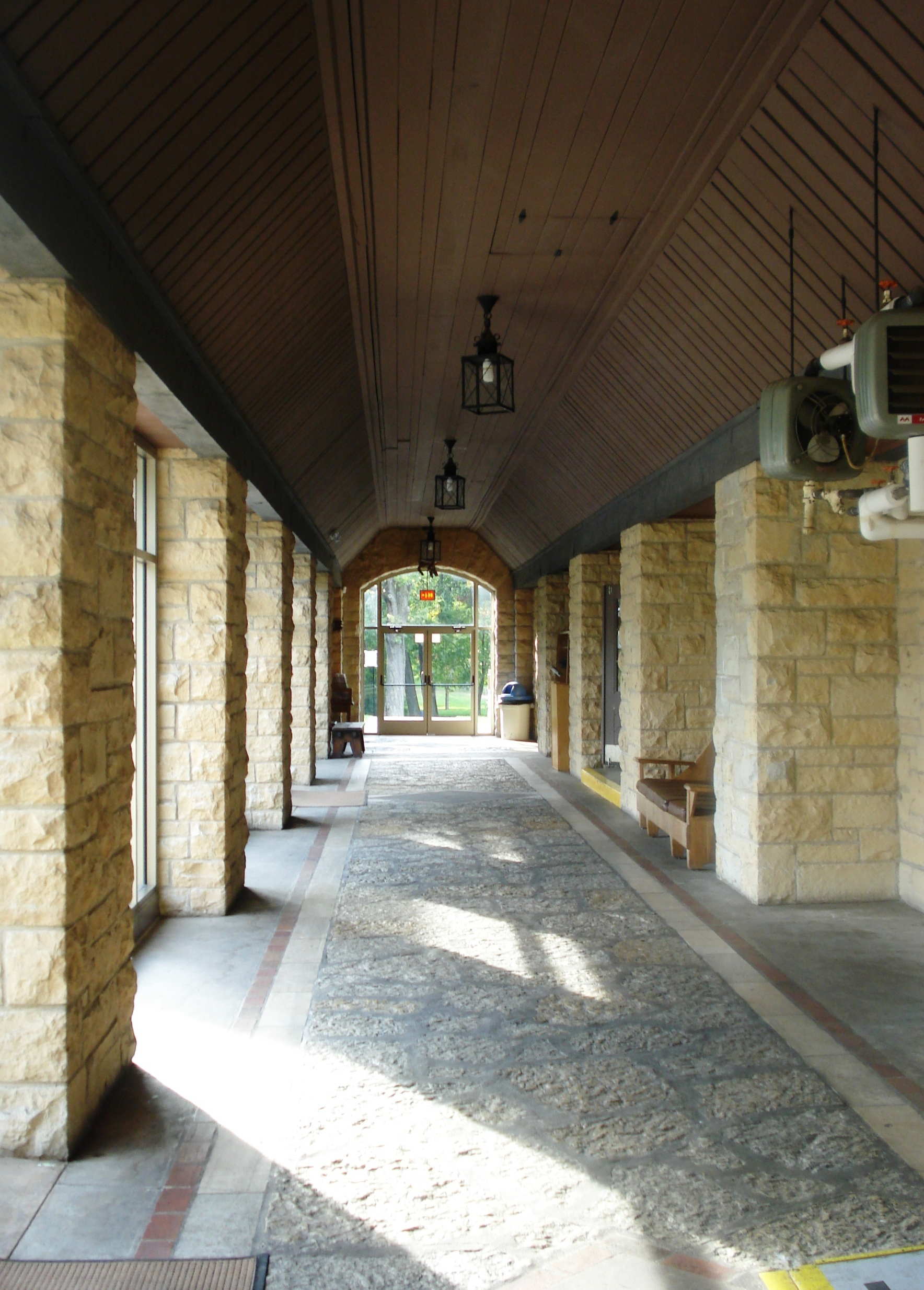
