= White Pines State Park Lodge and Cabins =

- U.S. National Register of Historic Places
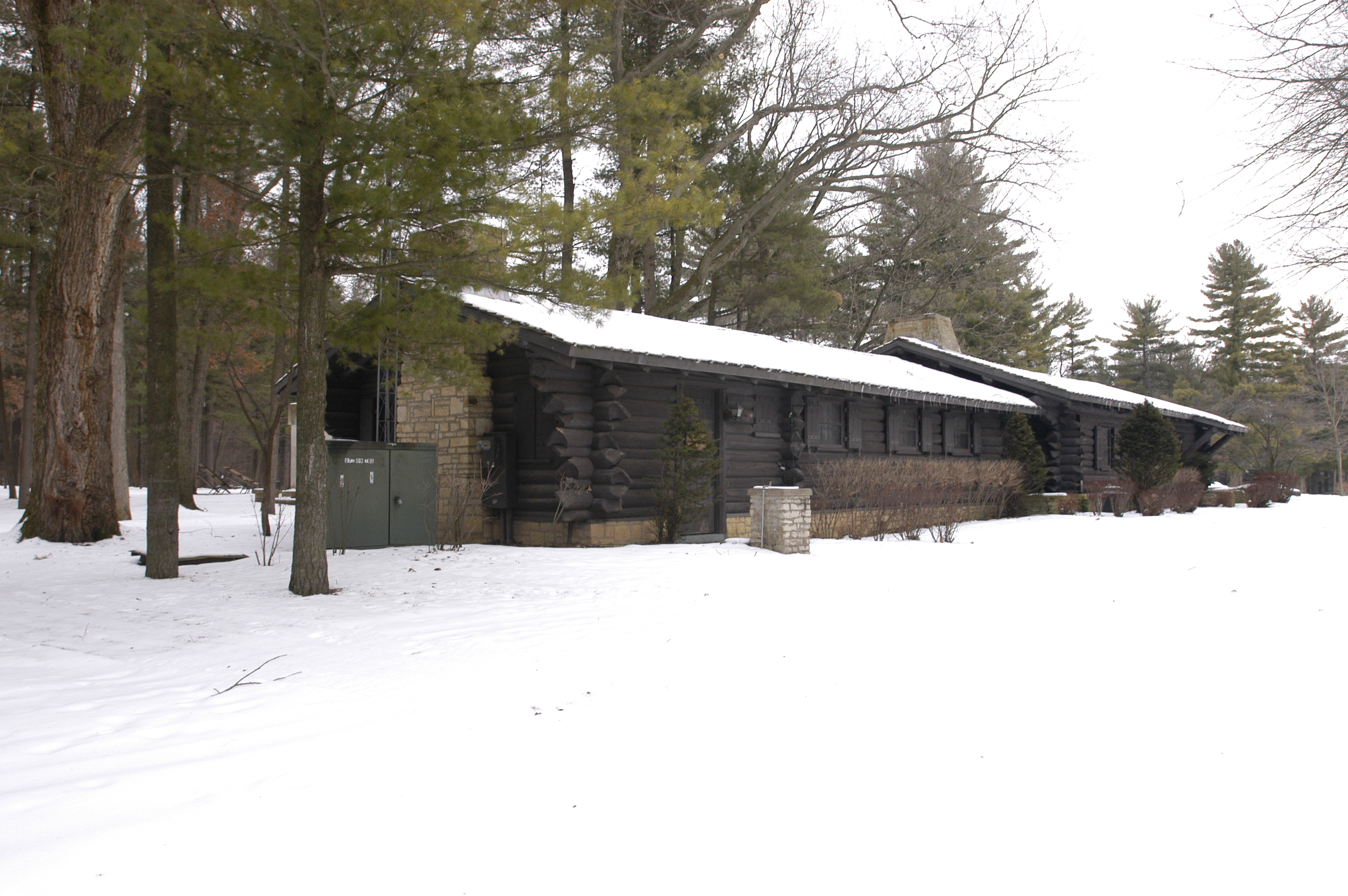
- The lodge at White Pines State Park was constructed as part of the New Deal.

- Location within Illinois Location within the United States
- Location: RR #1, Mount Morris, Illinois
- Coordinates: 41°59′44″N 89°27′52″W 41° 59' 44.5734"
- Built: 1933-1939
- Architect: Joseph F. Booton
- Architectural style: Vernacular
- MPS: MPL012 - Illinois State Park Lodges and Cabins Thematic Resources
- NRHP reference No.: 85002404
- Added to NRHP: March 4, 1985

The White Pines State Park Lodge and Cabins are located in rural Ogle County, Illinois near the village of Mount Morris. They were added to the National Register of Historic Places in 1985. The Cabins are one of two Historic Places found in or near Mount Morris, the other is the Samuel M. Hitt House. The Lodge and Cabins are part of a National Register Multiple Property Submission, they were submitted with several other state park lodges, all designed by Joseph F. Booton.

== History ==
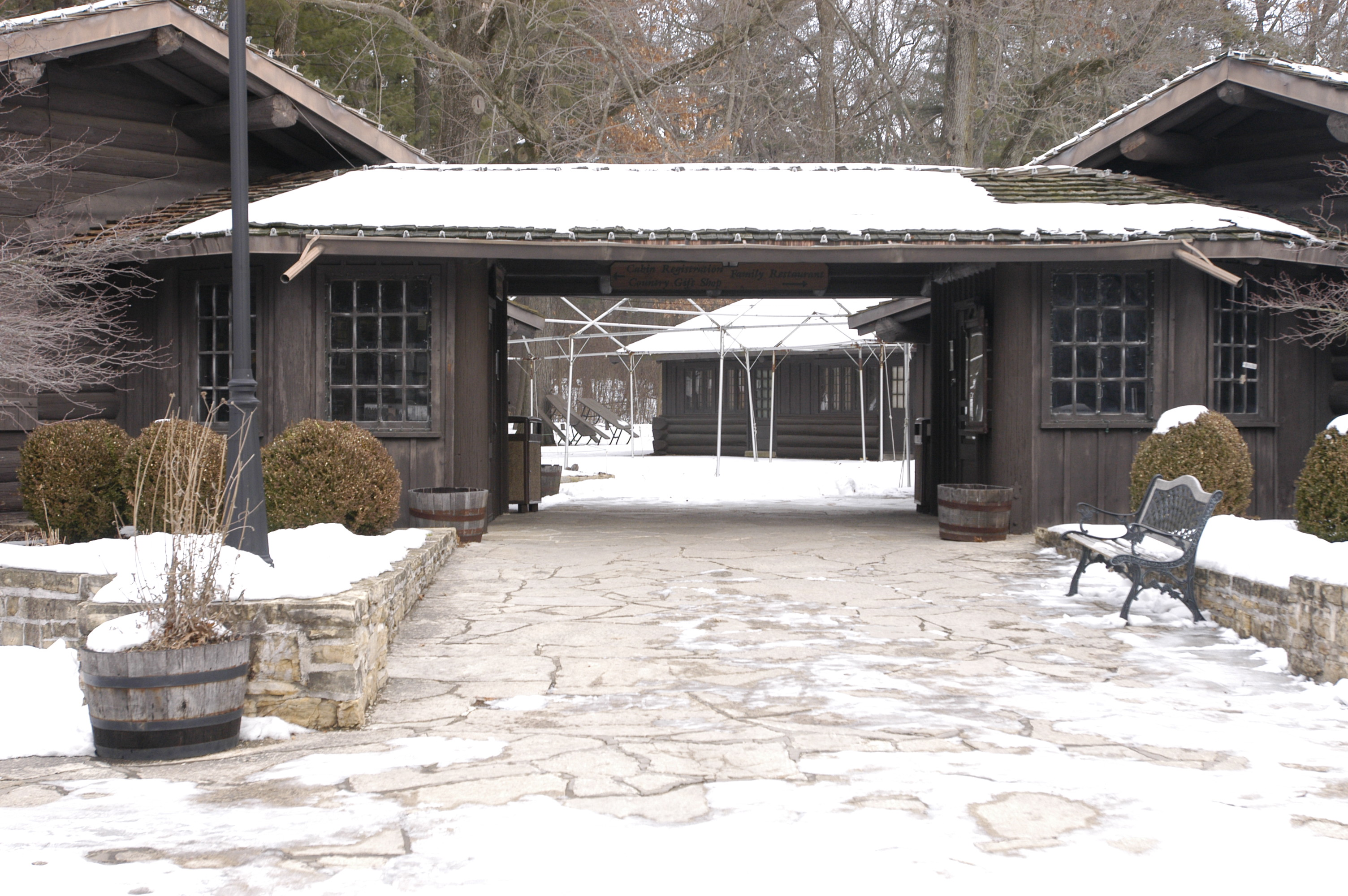
The covered breezeway between the two lodge buildings.

Separate entities from White Pines State Park, The Lodge and Cabins are privately managed as a "wilderness getaway," thus, they are privately owned and operated.

With the Great Depression in full swing the Civilian Conservation Corps (CCC) sought to relieve the work needs of unemployed Americans. The National Park Service sought to work with state governments in an effort to meet those ends. Many of the projects the CCC was involved with were construction projects. The project at White Pines was originally meant to be the construction of a lodge building. Two hundred men worked on the State Park construction project at one time, in the years 1933-1939, many of them World War I veterans.

After the lodge was completed, it was decided to build a restaurant and breezeway onto the lodge building. Logs for most of the project were shipped via railroad from as far away as Oregon and Washington state, unloaded in Stratford, Illinois and dragged to the construction site by teams of horses. The CCC project also completed sixteen one room log cabins and three four-bedroom cabins. The work crews also built picnic shelters, trail shelters and foot bridges. Only the logs for the cabins came from another source. They were purchased from a salvage company that had purchased utility poles from a defunct utility company at the price of 30 cents a piece.

As of 2007, the site was home to the sixteen one room cabins and the lodge building, which had been renovated and revamped. Modern amenities were available and the site is operated as a private lodge.

== Site ==
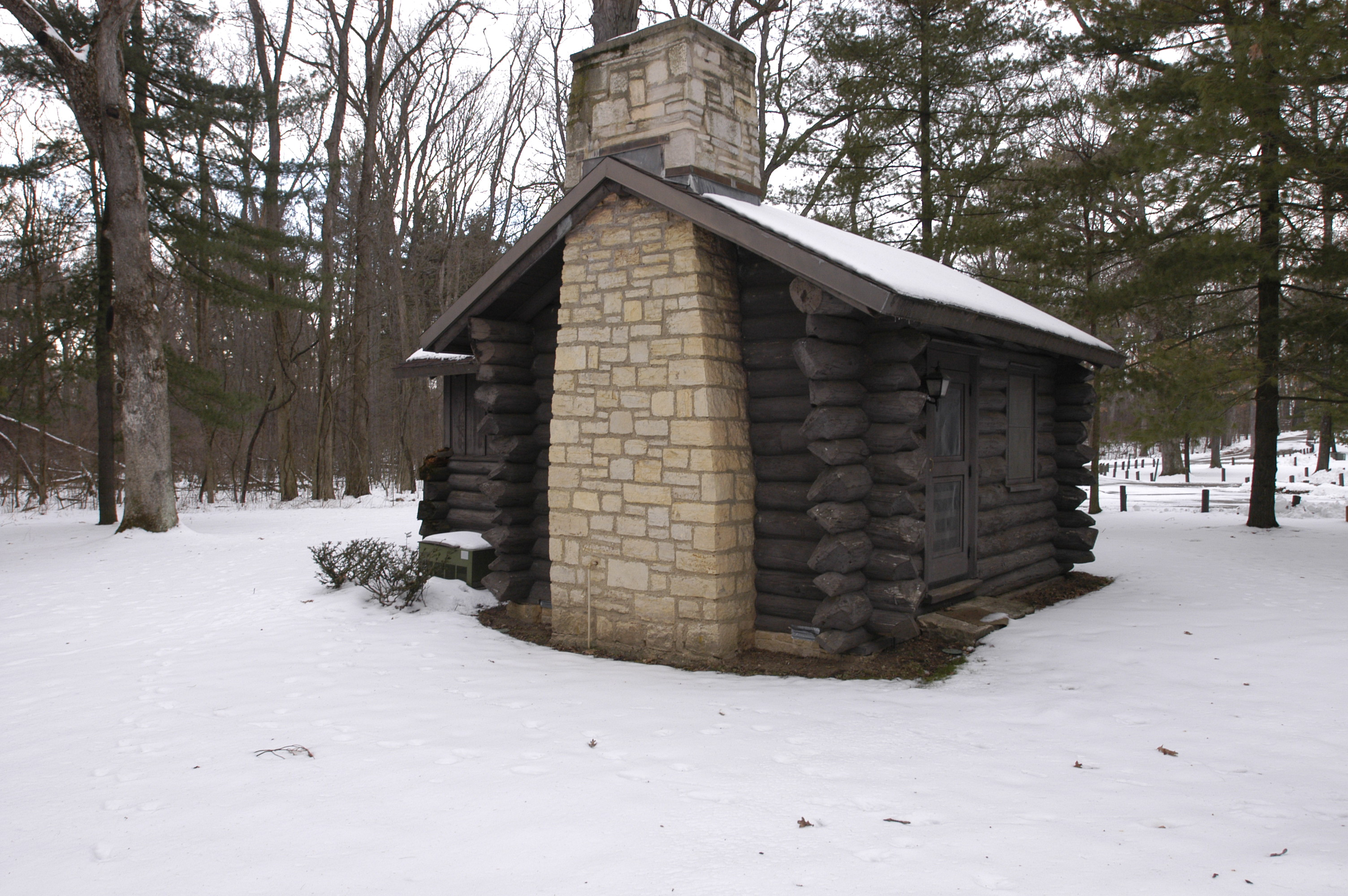
One of the Vernacular cabins at White Pines State Park.

The area that encompasses the National Register of Historic Places listing for the Lodge and Cabins at White Pines Forest State Park covers 7 acres (28,000 m^{2}). The area is ringed by a perimeter road which forms the border of the site listed on the Register. In addition, the area fifty yards beyond the road, into the woods, is also included, to preserve the "woodland retreat" character of the site.

== Architecture ==
The architecture of the lodge and cabins at White Pines was probably most influenced by the limitations on size instilled by the conservation effort underway at the southernmost stand of native white pines in the United States. When the site was under consideration for the lodge and cabins it had already seen extensive recreational use by the surrounding population. That use threatened to unhinge the delicate balance that existed within White Pines fragile ecosystem. As such, the Illinois State Park Plan, implemented at the time of the lodge's construction, already called for additional state recreational areas in the northern Illinois area to alleviate the burden on White Pines. Because of the concern for conservation at the site, the White Pines State Park Lodge and Cabins is the smallest of the five sites on the Multiple Property Submission. Despite its relative small size, especially compared to the Starved Rock Lodge or the Pere Marquette Lodge, the complex remains faithful to Booton's vision of "fanciful forest retreats."

=== Lodge ===
The lodge was the first structure to be completed at the site.

==== Exterior ====
The lodge building at White Pines is really a combination of two buildings connected by a covered breezeway. The north building contains the lounge and the south building a dining room and kitchen. Both rectangular lodge buildings are of unhewn pine log construction and set on a limestone base. Gable roofs are covered with wood shakes and supported by exposed interior log rafters. Both of the buildings have stone chimneys extending from the large stone fireplaces which form the interior focal point. The building almost comprehensively makes use of wooden logs in its construction, the only non-wood part of the lodge, and for that matter, the cabins, are its stone fireplaces and chimneys.

=== Cabins ===
The cabins, constructed after initial construction at the lodge was completed, are laid out in a circular pattern north of the lodge. The whole cabin area is ringed by a blacktop road and is set in a stand of white pines.

==== Exterior ====
The northern three cabins are the larger of the sixteen structures, being family units with multiple rooms. The remaining thirteen cabins are single room buildings. Like the lodge they are of largely unhewn log construction and feature stone chimneys extending from their roofs.
