= Nelson Thomas Potter Jr. =

American philosopher

- Born: Nelson Thomas Potter Jr. September 22, 1939; Mount Morris, Illinois, United States
- Died: May 12, 2013 (aged 73); Lincoln, Nebraska, United States
- Education: Johns Hopkins University
- Known for: Philosophy, Philosophy of Kant, Moral philosophy
- Awards: Woodrow Wilson Fellow
- Scientific career
- Fields: Philosophy
- Workplaces: University of Nebraska–Lincoln

Nelson Thomas Potter Jr. (September 22, 1939 – May 12, 2013) was a professor of philosophy at the University of Nebraska–Lincoln in Lincoln, Nebraska, United States.

== Intellectual biography ==
In 1961, he graduated summa cum laude from Monmouth College and in 1969, he received as Ph. D. from Johns Hopkins University in philosophy. In 1965, he became a faculty member of the Department of Philosophy at the University of Nebraska–Lincoln and was chair of the department from 1980 to 1985. He was a Woodrow Wilson Fellow and a member of Phi Beta Kappa. His philosophical research focused on ethics, aesthetics, and the philosophy of Kant. He retired and became professor emeritus in 2010.

== Personal biography ==
He was born and raised in Mount Morris, Illinois, the son of professional baseball player Nels Potter and Hazel (Park) Potter. In 1978, he married Kathleen Johnson and had a daughter Sophia. He was a member of Nebraskans Against the Death Penalty and the ACLU.

== Representative publications ==
- Kant and the Moral Worth of Actions. Southern Journal of Philosophy 34 (1996): 225–241.
- Kant on Obligation and Motivation in Law and Ethics. Jahrbuch fuer Recht und Ethik, Band 2 (1994), pp. 95–111.
- What is Wrong with Kant's Four Examples. Journal of Philosophical Research 43 (1993): 213–229.
