= Joseph F. Booton =

American architect

Joseph F. Booton (1897-1983) was an American architect and painter.

He was born in Urbana, Illinois and he served in the U.S. Navy before receiving a degree in architectural history from the University of Pennsylvania. When Joseph F. Booton was born on 20 May 1897, his father, John Beverly Booton, was 27 and his mother, Gertrude Dica Alkire, was 22. He lived in Springfield, Illinois, United States in 1935 and Chicago, Illinois, United States in 1940. He registered for military service in 1918. He died in October 1983, in Illinois, United States, at the age of 86, and was buried in Skokie, Illinois.

A number of his works are listed on the U.S. National Register of Historic Places (NRHP).

Works include:

- Black Hawk Museum and Lodge, 1510 46th Ave. Rock Island, IL, NRHP-listed
- Giant City State Park Lodge and Cabins, RR #1 Makanda, IL, NRHP-listed
- Pere Marquette State Park Lodge and Cabins, Box 158 Grafton, IL, NRHP-listed
- Starved Rock Lodge and Cabins, Box 116, Utica LaSalle-Peru, IL, NRHP-listed
- White Pines State Park Lodge and Cabins, RR #1 Mount Morris, IL, NRHP-listed
