= Nels Potter =

American baseball player (1911–1990)

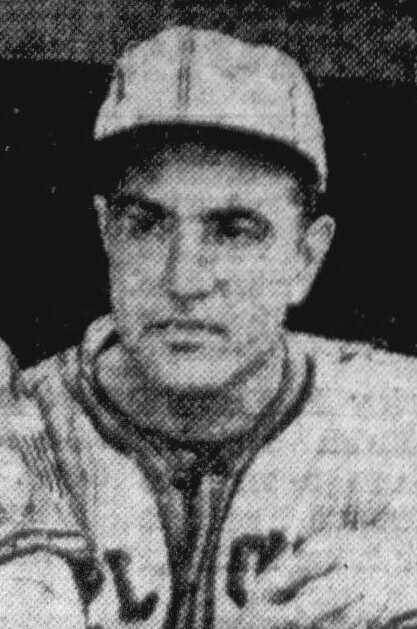
- Potter in 1944
- Pitcher
- Born: August 23, 1911; Mount Morris, Illinois, U.S.
- Died: September 30, 1990 (aged 79); Mount Morris, Illinois, U.S.
- Batted: Left Threw: Right

MLB debut
- April 25, 1936, for the St. Louis Cardinals

Last MLB appearance
- September 18, 1949, for the Boston Braves

MLB statistics
- Win–loss record: 92–97
- Earned run average: 3.99
- Strikeouts: 747
- Stats at Baseball Reference

Teams
- St. Louis Cardinals (1936); Philadelphia Athletics (1938–1941); Boston Red Sox (1941); St. Louis Browns (1943–1948); Philadelphia Athletics (1948); Boston Braves (1948–1949)

Nelson Thomas Potter (August 23, 1911 – September 30, 1990) was an American professional baseball player and right-handed pitcher who appeared in 349 games in Major League Baseball over a dozen seasons between 1936 and 1949, most notably as a member, in 1944, of the only St. Louis Browns team to win an American League pennant. He also played for the St. Louis Cardinals, Philadelphia Athletics, Boston Red Sox and Boston Braves. Potter's repertoire featured the screwball.

== Baseball career ==
=== Early struggles ===
Born in Mount Morris, Illinois, Potter was listed as 5 feet 11 inches (1.80 m) tall and 180 pounds (82 kg). He began his 18-year professional career in the minor leagues in 1932, and after a one-inning trial with the Cardinals in April 1936, played his first full MLB season in 1938 as a member of the Athletics. He led the American League in earned runs allowed with (144) in 1939, and overall won only 20 of 57 decisions in his first of two stints in Philadelphia, playing for a team that lost an average of 96 games a year between 1938 and 1941. During the latter year, on June 30, Potter's contract was sold to the Red Sox, who used him in only ten games and 20 innings pitched before assigning him outright to their top farm club, the Louisville Colonels. Potter won 18 games, losing eight, for the Colonels in 1942, earning his selection by the Browns in the Rule 5 draft on November 2, 1942.

=== St. Louis Browns ===
With World War II depleting major league rosters of playing talent, Potter proceeded to post three consecutive stellar seasons for the 1943–1944–1945 Browns, winning a total of 44 games with earned run averages below 3.00. In 1944, Potter won 19 games, leading the Browns' staff, as St. Louis prevailed over the Detroit Tigers by a single game in the pennant chase. Potter finished ninth in voting for the 1944 American League MVP balloting, with a 19–7 won–lost record, 16 complete games, three shutouts, and a 2.83 ERA. In the all-St. Louis 1944 World Series that followed, he started two games (the second and sixth contests) against the Cardinals. He allowed only one earned run in 92/3 innings pitched for an ERA of 0.93, but poor defense (he allowed four unearned runs) did him in, and he lost his only decision. The Cardinals won the world championship in six games.

On July 21, 1944, he became the first player to be ejected from a game and suspended for allegedly throwing a spitball. Umpire Cal Hubbard, who claimed that he had already warned Potter about his habit of wetting his fingers on the mound, ejected Potter in the fifth inning of a game against the New York Yankees. American League President Will Harridge later suspended Potter for 10 games.

In 1945, the Browns failed to repeat as American League champions, although they finished in the first division. Potter contributed 15 wins, 21 complete games and three shutouts, and set a personal best in earned run average at 2.47, sixth in the Junior Circuit. The first two postwar seasons, 1946 and 1947, were not as successful for Potter, as he won 12 games and lost 19 for the Browns, who had returned to their losing ways. In 1948, he was reacquired by the Athletics in May, but on June 13, after less than a month with Philadelphia, he was "fired" by manager Connie Mack after a losing effort in relief against his old Brownie teammates.

=== Boston Braves ===
Signed as a free agent by the Boston Braves seven days later, he returned to the National League for the first time in 12 years and helped lead Boston to the 1948 NL pennant. Potter worked in 18 games, threw three complete games in seven starts, and added three saves out of the bullpen. Overall, he posted a 5–2 record and a 2.33 earned run average in 85 innings pitched. He then appeared in his second World Series. Against the AL champion Cleveland Indians, Potter worked in two games. His effective relief appearance in Game 2, a Boston loss, was followed by a starting assignment in Game 5. In the latter game, Potter surrendered five runs, all earned, in 31/3 innings pitched on five hits (including two home runs), and left the game with the Braves trailing, 5–4. However, future Baseball Hall of Famer Warren Spahn, who relieved Potter, shut the door on the Indians on only one hit, and allowed Boston to come back to win, 11–5. Cleveland won Game 6 and the Series, however, the following day.

Potter spent 1949 as a member of the Braves' pitching staff, getting into 41 games, all but three in relief, but retired after his contract was sold to the Cincinnati Reds on September 26. He finished his regular-season MLB career with a 92–97 record, six shutouts, 22 saves, and a 3.99 ERA, allowing 1,721 hits and 582 bases on balls in 1,686 innings pitched. He struck out 747. In World Series play, he posted a record of 0–1 and an ERA of 3.60, allowing six earned runs, 16 hits and five bases on balls, with seven strikeouts, in 15 innings pitched over four different appearances.

== Family ==
Potter died in his hometown of Mount Morris at the age of 79 on September 30, 1990. He was survived by his wife, Hazel, two sons and a daughter: Nelson Jr., James, and Barbara.
