= Illinois Freedom Bell =

Landmark bell in Mount Morris, Illinois

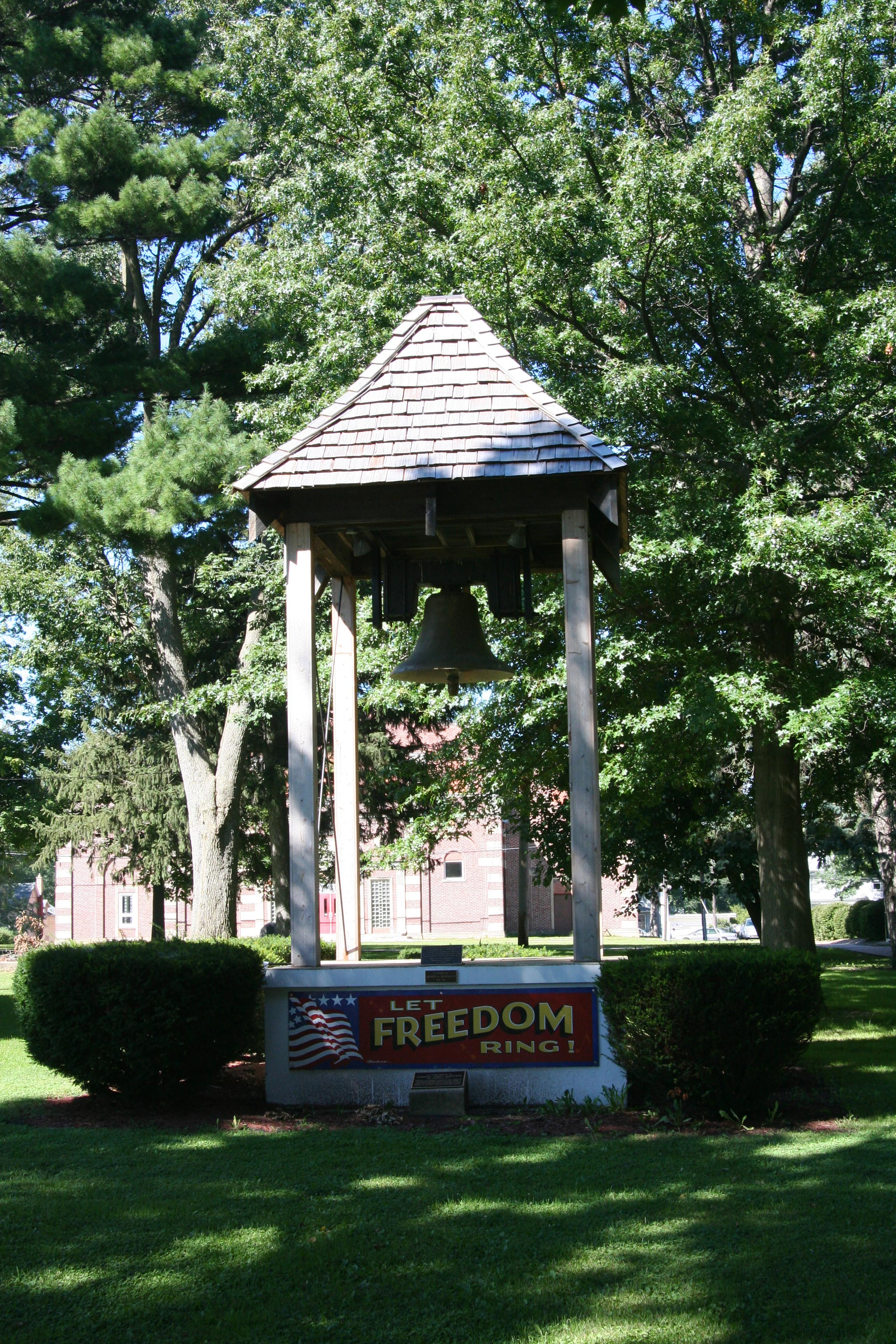
- The Illinois Freedom Bell in Mt. Morris.
- Interactive map of Illinois Freedom Bell
- Location: Mount Morris, Illinois, United States
- Coordinates: 42°02′51″N 89°26′02″W
- Completion date: 1862
- Restored date: 1966
- Website: www.letfreedomringfestival.com

The Illinois Freedom Bell is located in Mount Morris, Illinois, United States, and is the official freedom bell of the U.S. state of Illinois. The bell was created for a church in Lake Geneva, Wisconsin as a replica of the Liberty Bell in 1862. In 1910, while it was being moved across the frozen Geneva Lake following a fire at the church, the ice cracked and the bell sank to the bottom of the lake. It was salvaged in 1960 and the village of Mount Morris acquired it in 1966. The Illinois Freedom Bell is rung during the annual Let Freedom Ring festival, and it can be found beneath a gazebo on the village square. The bell has been credited with starting an Independence Day bell-ringing tradition across the United States. The bell was designated the official Illinois Freedom Bell in 1971.

== History ==
=== Origin ===
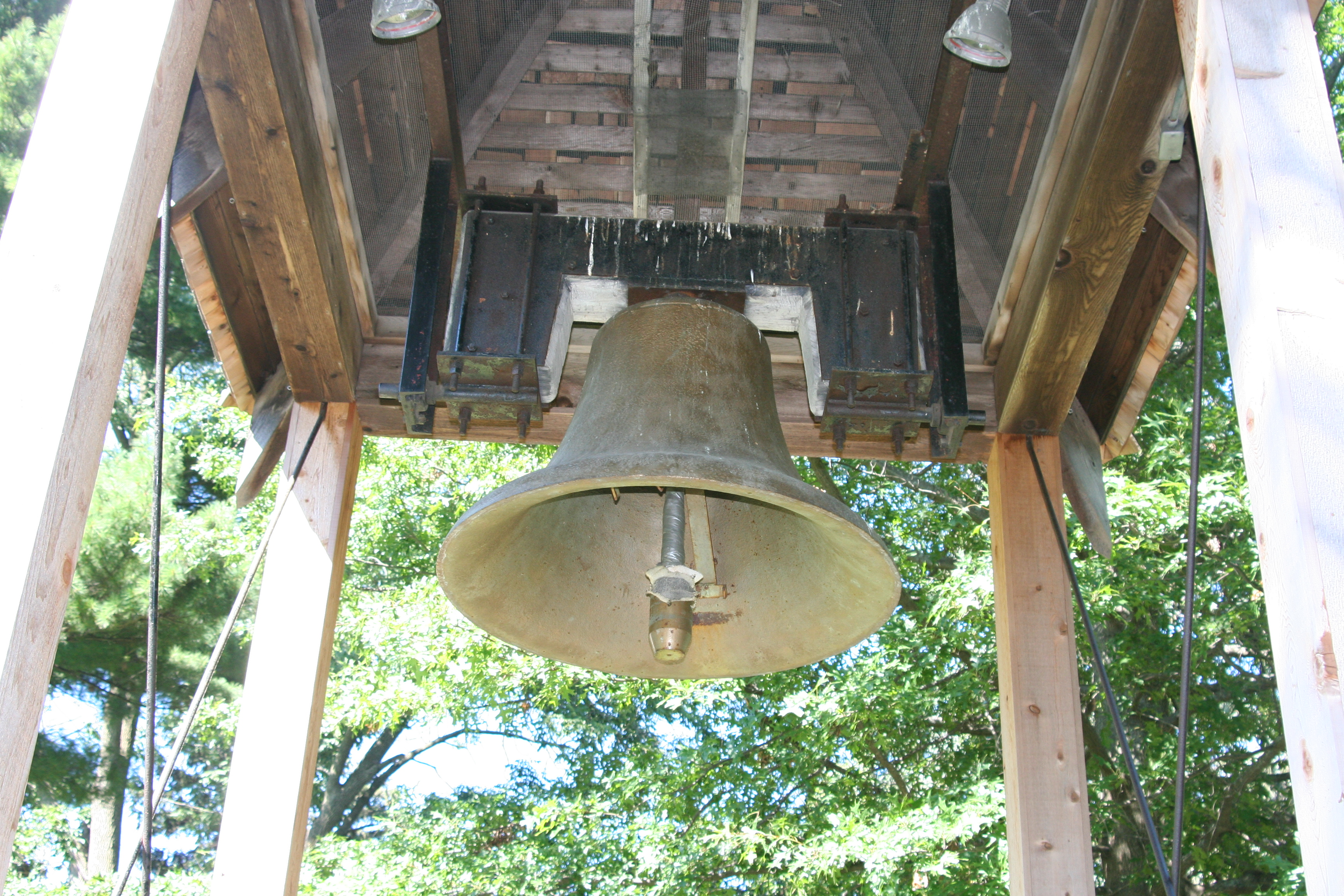
The Freedom Bell hanging from its bell tower.

The Illinois Freedom Bell is located in Mount Morris, Illinois, and was cast as a replica of the Liberty Bell in 1862. Following its casting, the bell was transported to Lake Geneva, Wisconsin, where it was kept in the belfry of a church along the north shore of Geneva Lake. In 1910, the church was destroyed by a fire; the bell fell during the fire but was undamaged; following the fire, the bell was put into storage. The church members then decided to reconstruct the church on the south side of the lake. During the winter, as a group of men attempted to drag the bell across the frozen lake, the weight of the bell cracked the ice and it sank to the bottom.

The bell remained submerged for over 40 years before a wealthy resident of Lake Geneva decided to surface the bell in 1960. The resident located the bell, and surfaced it with great difficulty, intent on making the future Illinois Freedom Bell the focal point of his new home. After the bell was salvaged he decided it did not suit his purposes. A young farmer from Johnsburg purchased the bell, and it was again kept in storage.

In 1966, an article was published about the bell's submersion and resurfacing at Geneva Lake. The article interested the people of Mount Morris, Illinois, and they sent 12 members of their Fourth of July Committee to investigate the bell in Johnsburg. The people of Mount Morris decided to purchase the bell; a committee was formed and obtained a loan from the Mount Morris VFW. The group also collected donations from local residents to purchase the bell for US$500. By July 4, 1966, the Illinois Freedom Bell hung from the gazebo in its current location, and the two writers who first suggested bell ringing as an annual Independence Day ceremony, Eric Hatch and Eric Sloane were on hand for its dedication.

Five years later, in 1971, the bell was designated the Official Freedom Bell of the State of Illinois by Illinois Governor Richard B. Ogilvie. A plaque was added to the tower on July 4, 1972, with an inscription from Governor Ogilvie that reads:

On this occasion of the first official ringing of the Freedom Bell at Mount Morris, let this message be heard by all Americans: "Let us be one nation dedicated as never before to the realization of the promise of freedom for all."

=== Festival ===
On February 17, 1963, an issue of This Week contained an article, "Make Freedom Really Ring", written by two Connecticut writers, Eric Hatch and Eric Sloane. In the article, they suggested that every July 4, all bells in the country ring for four minutes, and radio stations broadcast the ringing for two minutes. Readers across the country took the advice of the magazine's editor, and contacted local officials in support of a nationwide bell-ringing observance. Concurrently, a resolution was proposed in Congress by Connecticut Senator Abraham Ribicoff that called for the ringing of bells nationwide at 2 p.m every July 4. Eastern Daylight Time. The bill passed both the Senate and House of Representatives later that year.

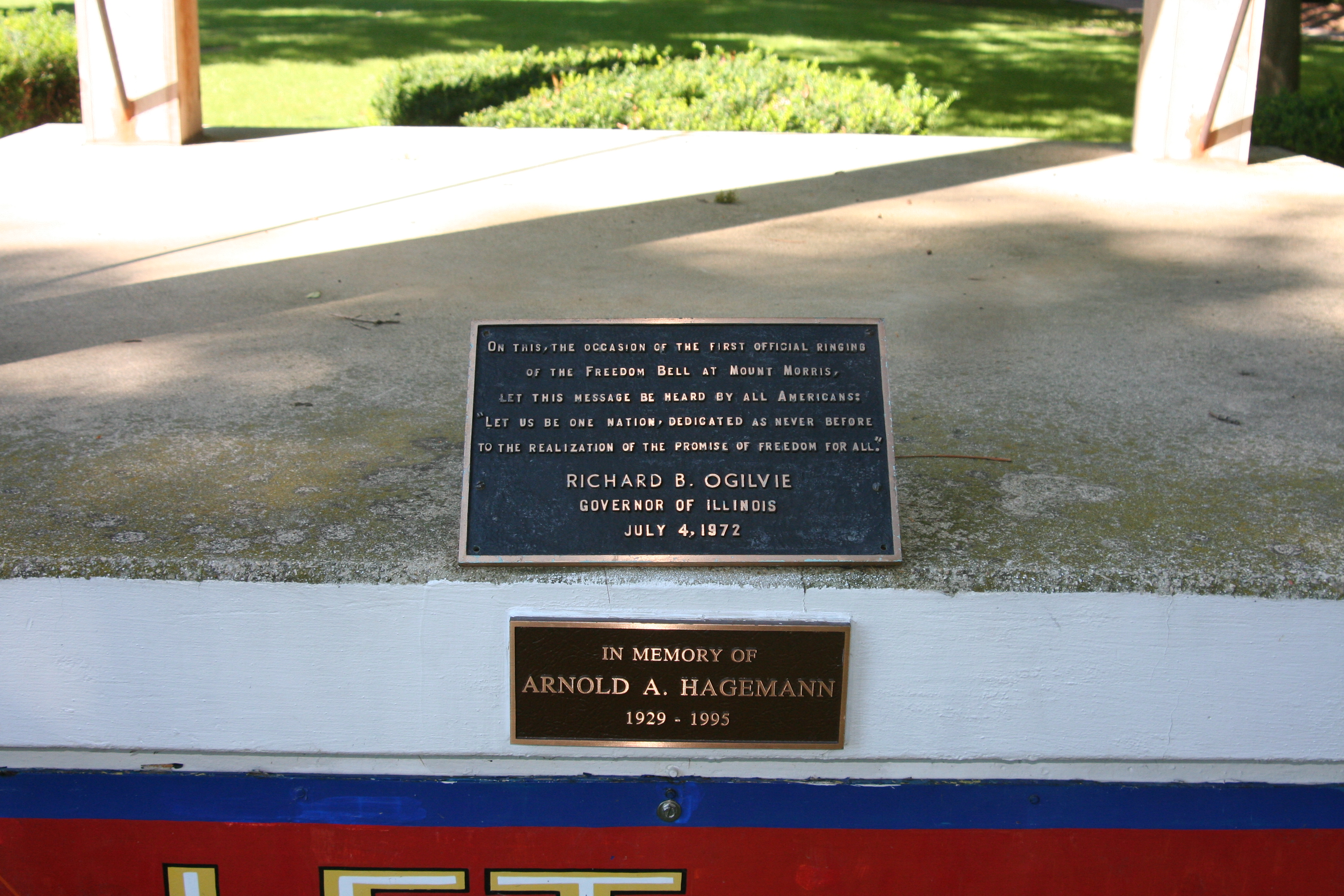
Plaque under the bell with quote from Governor Ogilvie.

Meanwhile, the village of Mount Morris had already decided to hold their own bell-ringing during the village's annual Independence Day festival, the "Let Freedom Ring". Subsequently, on April 30, 1963, Illinois native and rising Republican political star Ronald Reagan visited Mount Morris to dedicate the first Mount Morris freedom bell, which now hangs at the Veterans' Memorial Fountain. The first freedom bell was a small 16 inch (40.6 cm) bell. Later, as U.S. president in 1984, Reagan was presented with a replica of the official Illinois Freedom Bell in the Oval Office by U.S. Representative Lynn Morley Martin. The first national bell-ringing took place on July 4, 1963; Mount Morris also participated in that ringing. Even though many states sponsored bell-ringings, Hatch and Sloane both credited Mount Morris with making their suggestion a reality.

The Illinois Freedom Bell is annually rung in unison, at 1 pm CDT (18:00 UTC) on the Independence Day, July 4, with other bells across the United States. Thousands of people gather in the village to hear the bell each year on Independence Day. In Mount Morris, the annual event is known as the Let Freedom Ring festival. The Mount Morris festival and bell ringing has been attended by several notable individuals. In 1973, future Illinois Governor and member of the 9/11 Commission, James Thompson attended the festival and bell ringing. A year later, in 1974, Richard Blake, a noted Abraham Lincoln impersonator, appeared at the festival to speak as Lincoln.

Several times the Let Freedom Ring festival has been broadcast nationally. During the 1964 festival, Governor Otto Kerner was the speaker at the bell-ringing observance, and his address was transmitted via telephone to the Illinois pavilion at the 1964 New York World's Fair. The 1965 bell-ringing was broadcast over the public address system at Wrigley Field in Chicago. Over the years, the committee for the festival requested that the bell-ringing be part of the Illinois Sesquicentennial, the U.S. Bicentennial, and the Statue of Liberty Centennial celebrations, all of which were allowed. The "Let Freedom Ring" celebration hosts a "Freedom Run", arts and crafts, a parade, a fireworks display, and the highlighted ringing of the Illinois Freedom Bell.

== Description ==
The Illinois Freedom Bell is silver in color and cast from bronze metal. It is four feet (1.2 m) tall and four feet (1.2 m) wide with a weight of 1,500 pounds (680 kg). The bell is housed in a 15-foot wooden "tower," which stands in a prominent position on the town square.

== See also ==
- Liberty Bell
