= Samuel M. Hitt House =

Historic house in Illinois, United States

- U.S. National Register of Historic Places
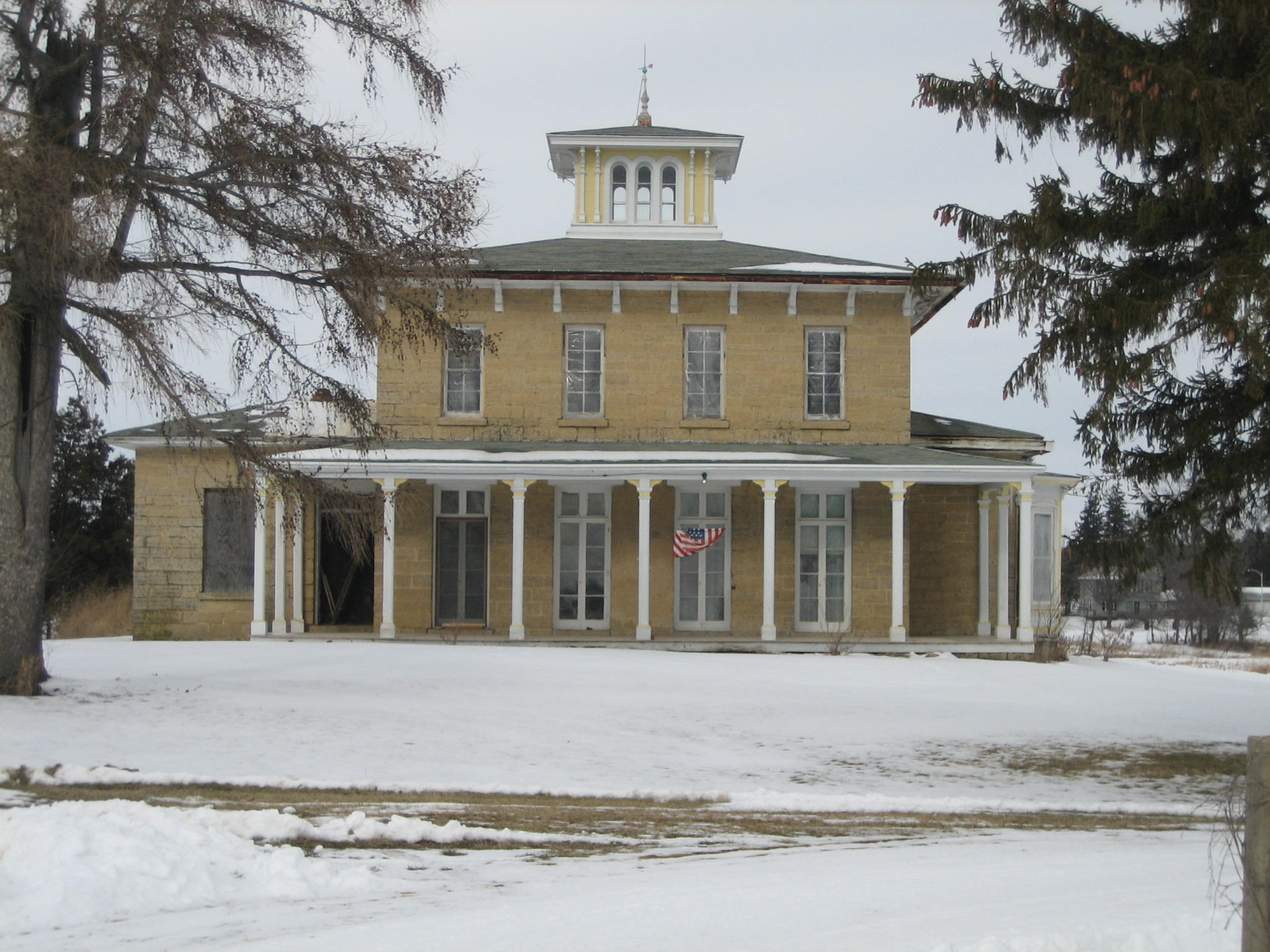
- The Samuel M. Hitt House is a private residence.

- Location within Illinois Location within the United States
- Location: 7782 IL 64 W, Mount Morris, Illinois
- Coordinates: 42°2′51″N 89°26′2″W
- Area: 0.1 acres (0.040 ha)
- Built: 1858
- Architect: Samuel M. Hitt (builder)
- Architectural style: Italianate
- NRHP reference No.: 85002841
- Added to NRHP: November 14, 1985

The Samuel M. Hitt House is located in the Ogle County, Illinois village of Mount Morris, along Illinois Route 64. The Hitt House is listed on the National Register of Historic Places, a status bestowed it 1985.

== Architecture ==
The Samuel M. Hitt House was built by Samuel M. Hitt. It is designed in the Italianate style and features limestone wall material. The Hitt house was constructed in 1858.

== Significance ==
The Samuel M. Hitt House was listed on the National Register of Historic Places on November 14, 1985, for its significance in the area of architecture.
