= White Pines Forest State Park =

State park in Illinois, US

- IUCN category V (protected landscape/seascape)
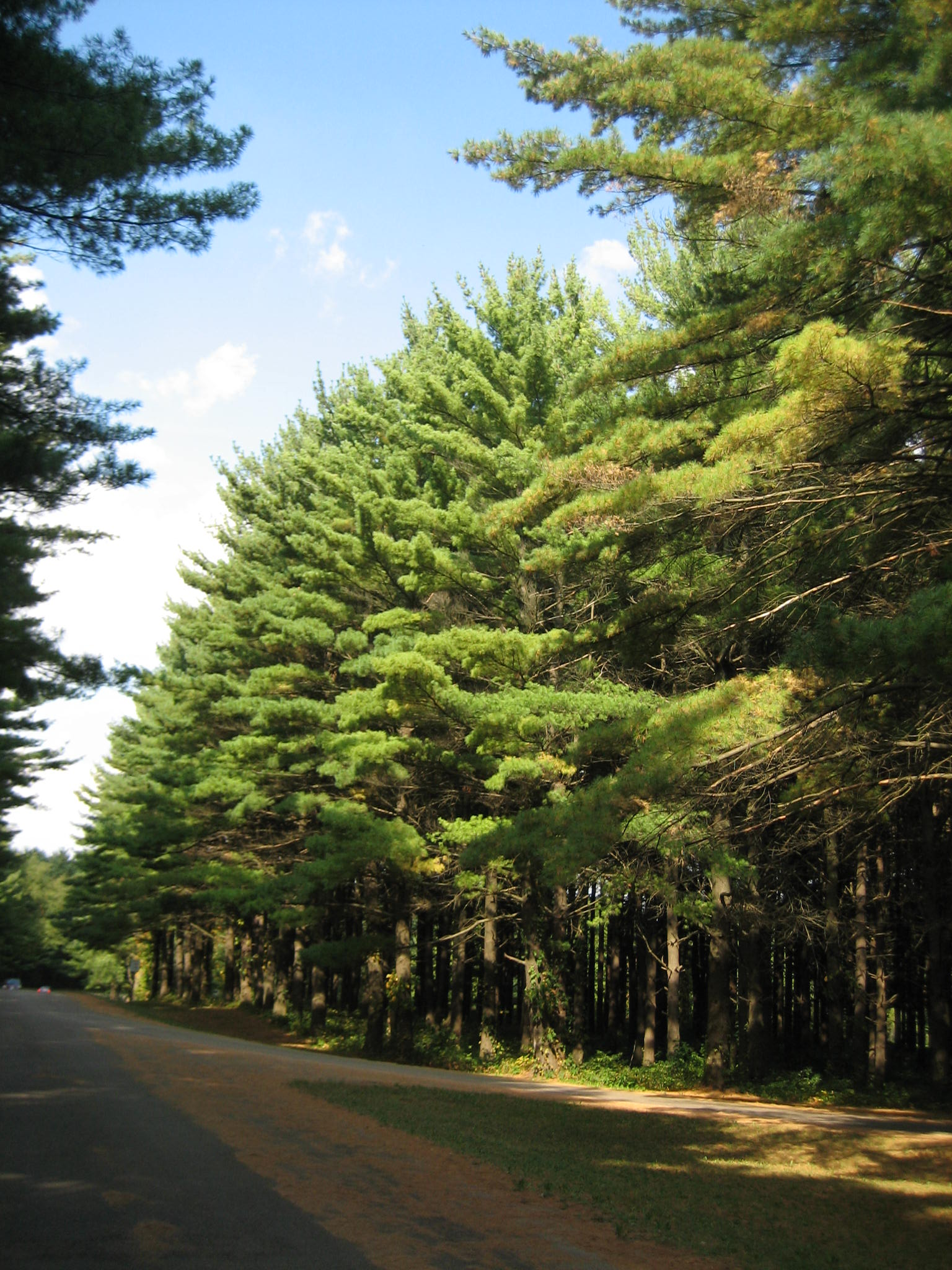
- A portion of the southernmost stand of native white pines (Pinus strobus) in Illinois.

- Location within Illinois
- Location: Ogle, Illinois, United States
- Coordinates: 41°59′44″N 89°28′07″W
- Area: 385 acres (156 ha)
- Elevation: 722 ft (220 m)
- Established: 1927
- Named for: native white pines
- Visitors: 350,000+
- Governing body: Illinois Department of Natural Resources
- Website: White Pines Forest State Park

White Pines Forest State Park, more commonly referred to as White Pines State Park, is an Illinois state park in Ogle County, Illinois. It is located near the communities of Polo, Mount Morris and Oregon. The 385-acre (156 ha) park contains the southernmost remaining stand of native white pine trees in the state of Illinois, and that area, 43 acres (17 ha), was designated an Illinois Nature Preserve in 2001.

The area was poised to become a state park in 1903, but a veto by Governor Richard Yates prevented that from occurring. Supporters continued to press for the White Pines Woods, as it was once known, to receive state park designation throughout the period 1903-1927. In 1927 the park was established with help from supporters in the Chicago media. The park contains two freshwater streams, white sandstone rock formations, and a variety of activities generally associated with Illinois state parks. Along Pine Creek, one of the park's two streams, fords were constructed instead of bridges allowing visitors to drive through the creek.

== History ==
=== Early history ===
White Pines Forest State Park is located in what was once a part of the Sauk leader Black Hawk's territory and encompasses an area once known as White Pines Woods. White Pines State Park nearly became an Illinois State Park as early as 1903, when the state established its first state park at Fort Massac. Members of the Oregon, Illinois Woman's Council started the process by lobbying the Illinois legislature to set aside White Pines Woods as a state park. In 1903 the Illinois legislature appropriated US$30,000 for the purchase of White Pines Woods, the southernmost stand of virgin, native white pine trees in the state. The move was stalled when then-Illinois Governor Richard Yates vetoed the measure, citing costs. After 1903 and before 1927 (when the state park was established), the "Pines Woods Bill" was introduced several times without success. The designation of Starved Rock State Park in 1912 reportedly frustrated the supporters of White Pines Woods' designation as a state park.

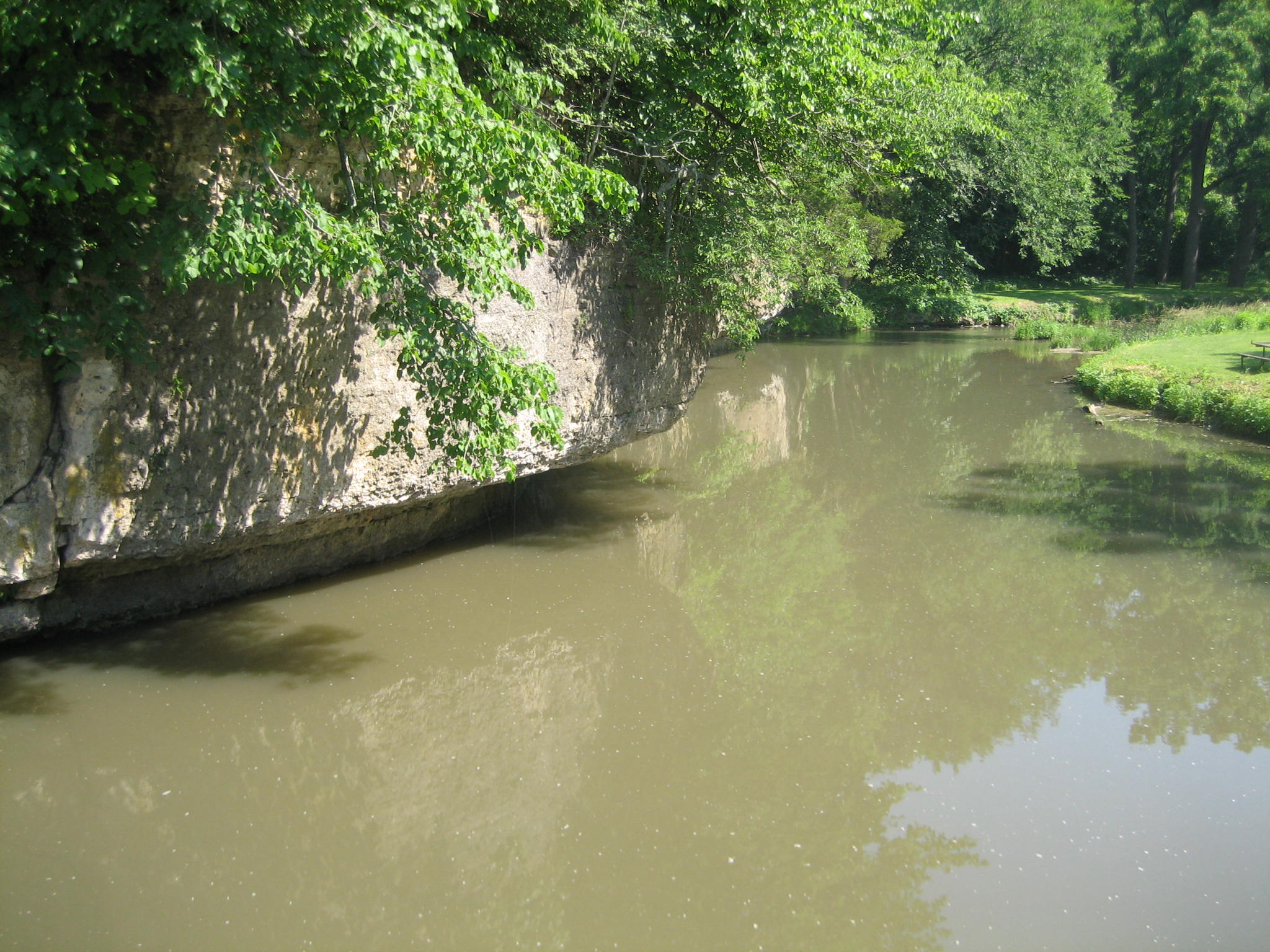
White sandstone rock formations along Pine Creek within the park

The influential Friends of Our Native Landscape included the area around the Rock River between Dixon and Oregon on a list of 20 places in Illinois that should be designated state parks. Located in "Rock River country", along an old Indian trail, was White Pines Woods covering 500 acres (200 ha) in a canyon of white sandstone rock carved by Pine Creek. At the time, within White Pines Woods, the tallest trees stood 90 feet (27 m) in height. The area was noted by Elia W. Peattie, a poet and member of the Eagle's Nest Art Colony (located at present-day Lowden State Park), who expressed the need for preservation of the White Pines Woods in one of her poems.

The Illinois Board of State Park Advisers was established under a 1925 state law. The law, which was amended in 1931, gave the director of the Illinois Department of Public Works jurisdiction over the state parks. The Public Works position was a result of 1917 reforms by Governor Frank Lowden. The law also mandated a system of state parks, under the Illinois Department of Conservation, later renamed the Illinois Department of Natural Resources. Per the 1925 mandate, White Pines Forest became a state park in 1927 after its proponents enlisted the support of the Chicago Tribune and WGN Radio. That year, Governor Len Small moved to purchase White Pines for $63,949.

=== Lodge and cabins ===
In 1933, with the Great Depression in full swing, the Civilian Conservation Corps (CCC) sought to relieve the work needs of unemployed Americans. The National Park Service sought to work with state governments in an effort to meet those ends. Many of the projects the CCC was involved with were construction projects. The project at White Pines was originally meant to be the construction of a lodge building. From 1933 to 1939, two hundred men, many of them World War I veterans, worked on the State Park construction project.

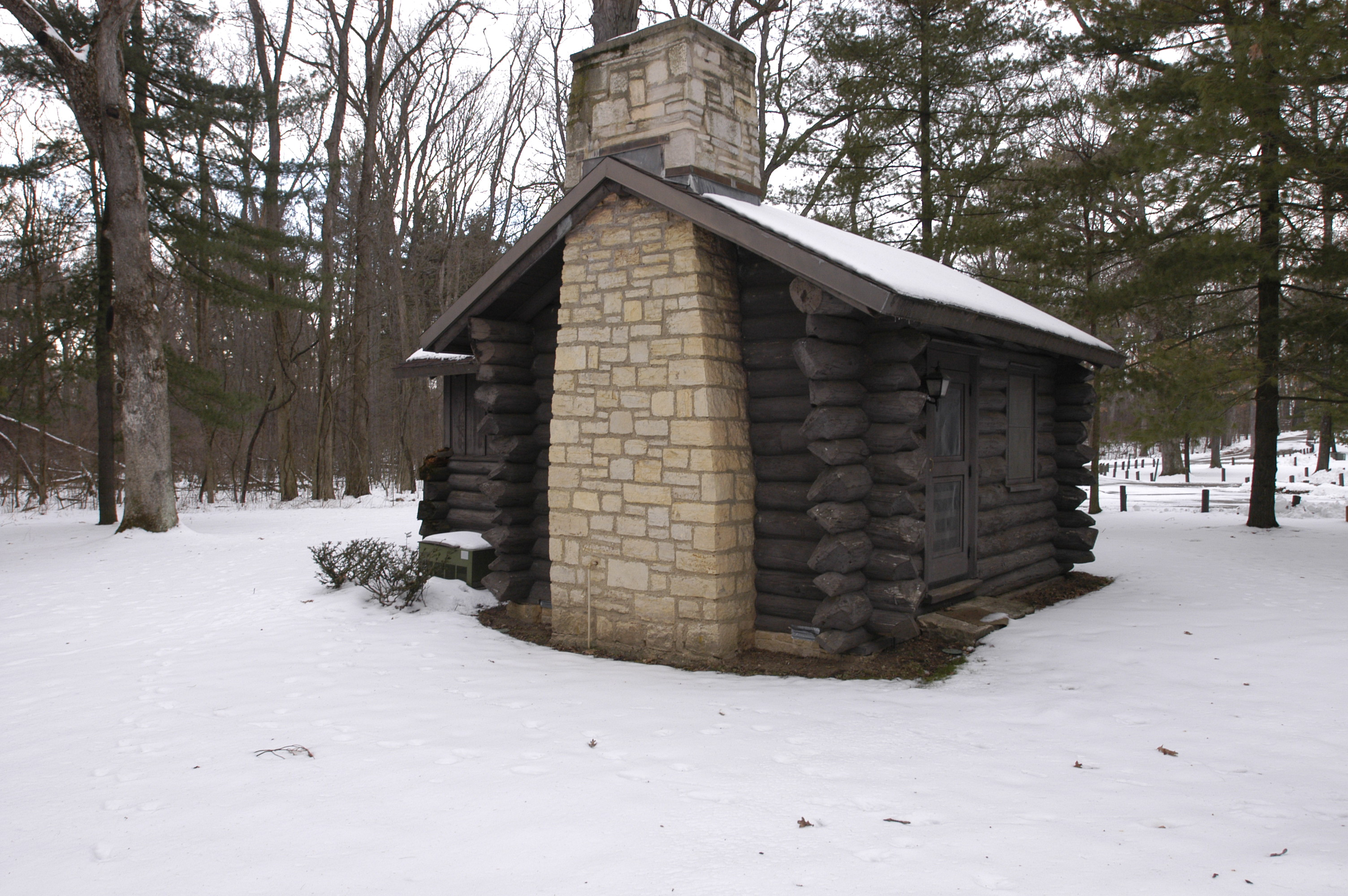
One of the Vernacular cabins at White Pines State Park

After the lodge was completed, it was decided to build a restaurant and breezeway onto the lodge building. Logs for most of the project were shipped via railroad from as far away as Oregon and Washington state, unloaded in Stratford, Illinois and dragged to the construction site by teams of horses. The CCC project also completed sixteen one-room log cabins and three four-bedroom cabins. The work crews also built picnic shelters, trail shelters, and foot bridges. Only the logs for the cabins came from another source. They were purchased from a salvage company that had purchased utility poles from a defunct utility company at the price of 30 cents a piece.

=== Nature Preserve designation ===
In September 2001 the Illinois Nature Preserves Commission dedicated a 43-acre (17 ha) section of the state park at White Pines Forest as Illinois' 300th nature preserve. Nature preserve designation gave the stand of white pine trees in the park the highest form of legal protection in the state. The designation restricts activities to those that do not impact the area's natural features such as hiking and birdwatching. Activities such as logging, farming, hunting, and fishing are all prohibited within Illinois Nature Preserves, though in some cases there are exceptions for hunting and fishing.

== Description ==
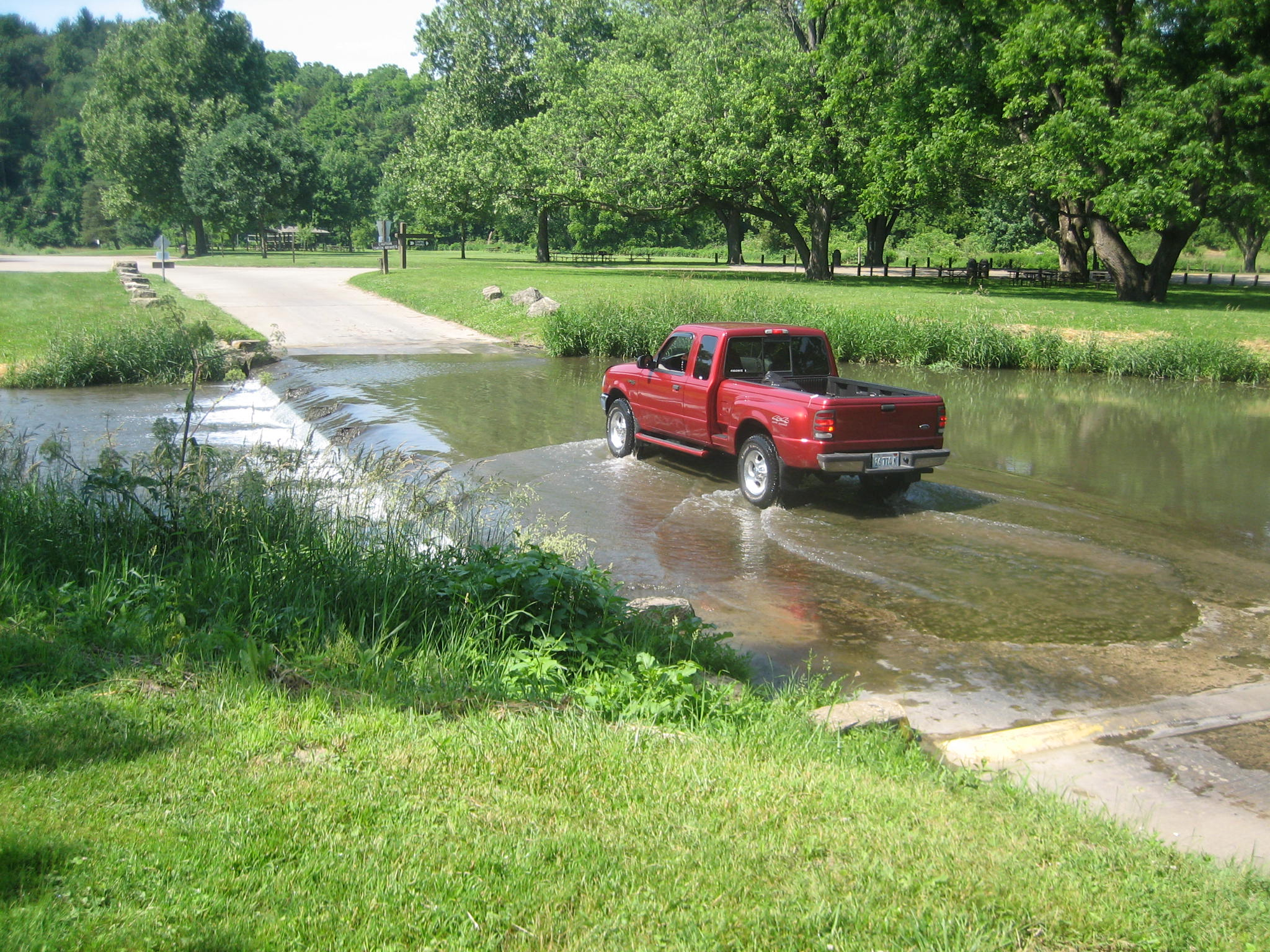
A truck crossing one of the park's fords at Pine Creek

White Pines State Park is a 385-acre (156 ha) state park located in the heart of the Rock River Valley in Ogle County. The park represents the southernmost remaining stand of virgin white pine (Pinus strobus) forest in the state. The state park, like all Illinois state parks, is operated and maintained by the Illinois Department of Natural Resources (IDNR). White Pines Forest State Park provides habitat for a variety of plant and animal life and has two freshwater streams within its boundaries.

Among the park's most distinctive and well-known features are the vehicular river crossings. At three places, crossing Pine Creek, fords were constructed instead of bridges. The fords offer visitors a chance to actually drive through the creek, though high water frequently closes the crossings. Hikers are relegated to pedestrian bridges or stepping stones in the creek to cross the stream. Floods are frequent enough on Pine Creek, a large watershed to the north of the park, that there is an emergency exit from the campground. When high water closes the fords, the campground is cut off and the emergency exit is the only way out.

== Wildlife ==
The banks of Pine Creek and Spring Creek are lined with large rock and cliff formations that provide habitat to plants ranging from large trees to moss to hanging vines. The cliffs harbor plants rare in the state of Illinois such as Canada yew and sullivantia (family Saxifragaceae), an Illinois state-threatened species. When in season, the park's many species of wildflowers bloom, some of the flowers found in the park include: trout lily, Solomon's seal, bloodroot, blue-eyed grass, spring beauty, and hepatica. The forest undergrowth provides small mammal habitat and among the mammals that can be seen in the park are: red squirrels, raccoons, deer, and chipmunks. Birds include thrushes, warblers, wild turkey, and winter-migratory birds. The creeks are populated with smallmouth bass, rock bass, channel catfish and, when they are stocked by the IDNR, rainbow trout.

== Activities ==
The park, Illinois' third oldest, has become one of the state's most visited parks, hosting over 350,000 visitors each year. It was visited by 10,000 people on given weekends during the 1930s, and the 1958 record-setting attendance mark was documented at 874,000.

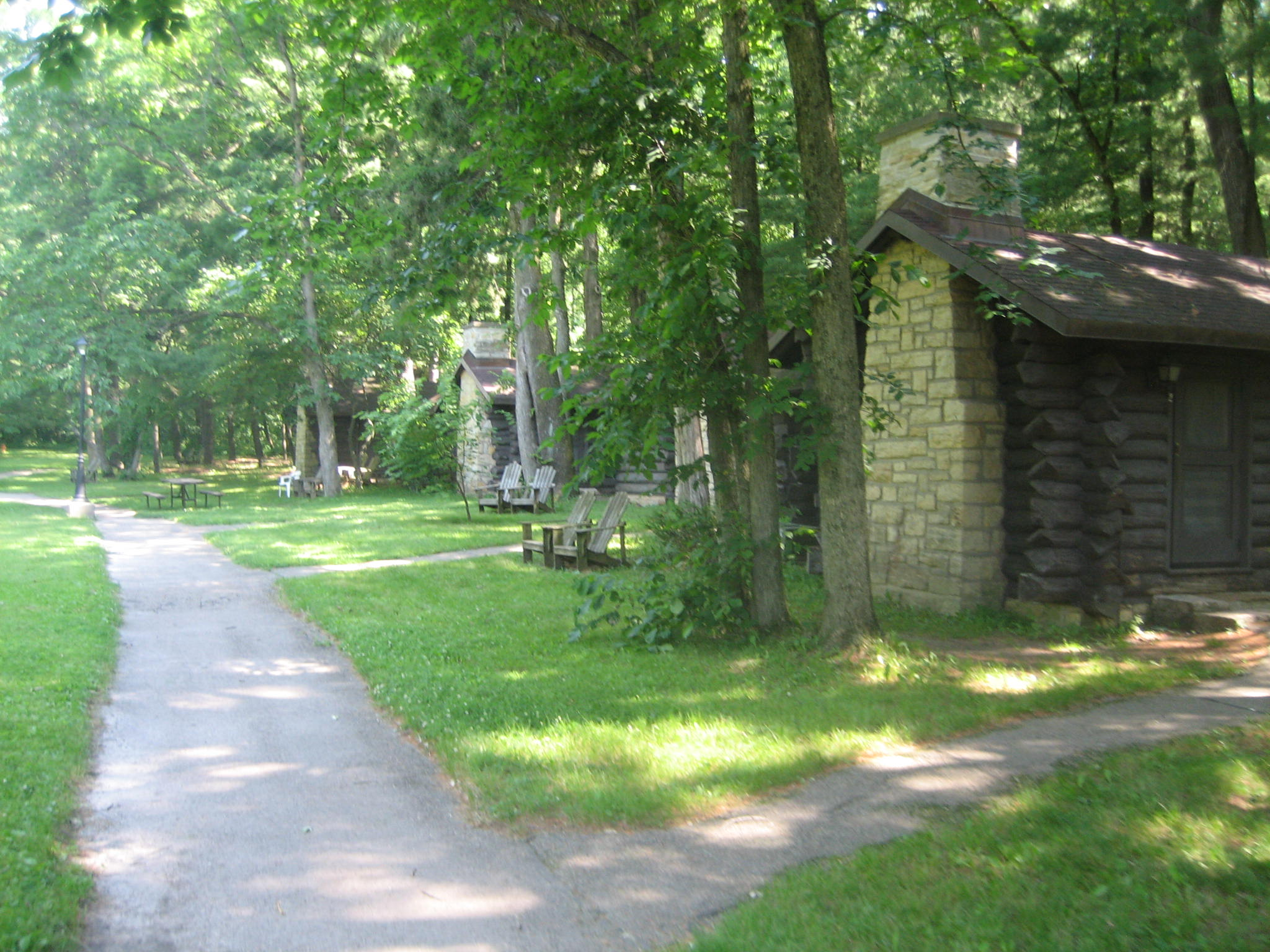
One of the cabins at White Pines State Park

The park is a public area and has a variety of activities that are typically associated with protected areas meant to be visited by the public. During the warmer months, picnicking, camping, lodging, hiking, and fishing are available. During the winter, cross-country skiing trails open, and other activities such as camping remain available as well. The lodge and cabins are listed on the U.S. National Register of Historic Places. The 25 cabins are operated by a privately owned entity, the White Pines Inn, and the lodge features a popular private restaurant.

White Pines has 103 campsites all accessible by vehicle; the campgrounds are sometimes closed because of high water or soft ground. Seven hiking trails wind a total of five miles (8 km) through the park; three of the seven trails are less than one mile (1.6 km) in length. The two cross-country ski trails total 4.5 miles (7.2 km) in length and are open as winter weather permits. The park's lodge and cabins consist of 13 one-room cabins and 3 four-room cabins; all cabins have a shower and other modern amenities. The lodge, though renovated, maintains its historic integrity, and new features were blended with the old. The lounge, in the lodge, is filled with crafts and artwork.

== See also ==
- List of protected areas of Illinois
