= Mount Morris, Illinois =

Mount Morris
- Village
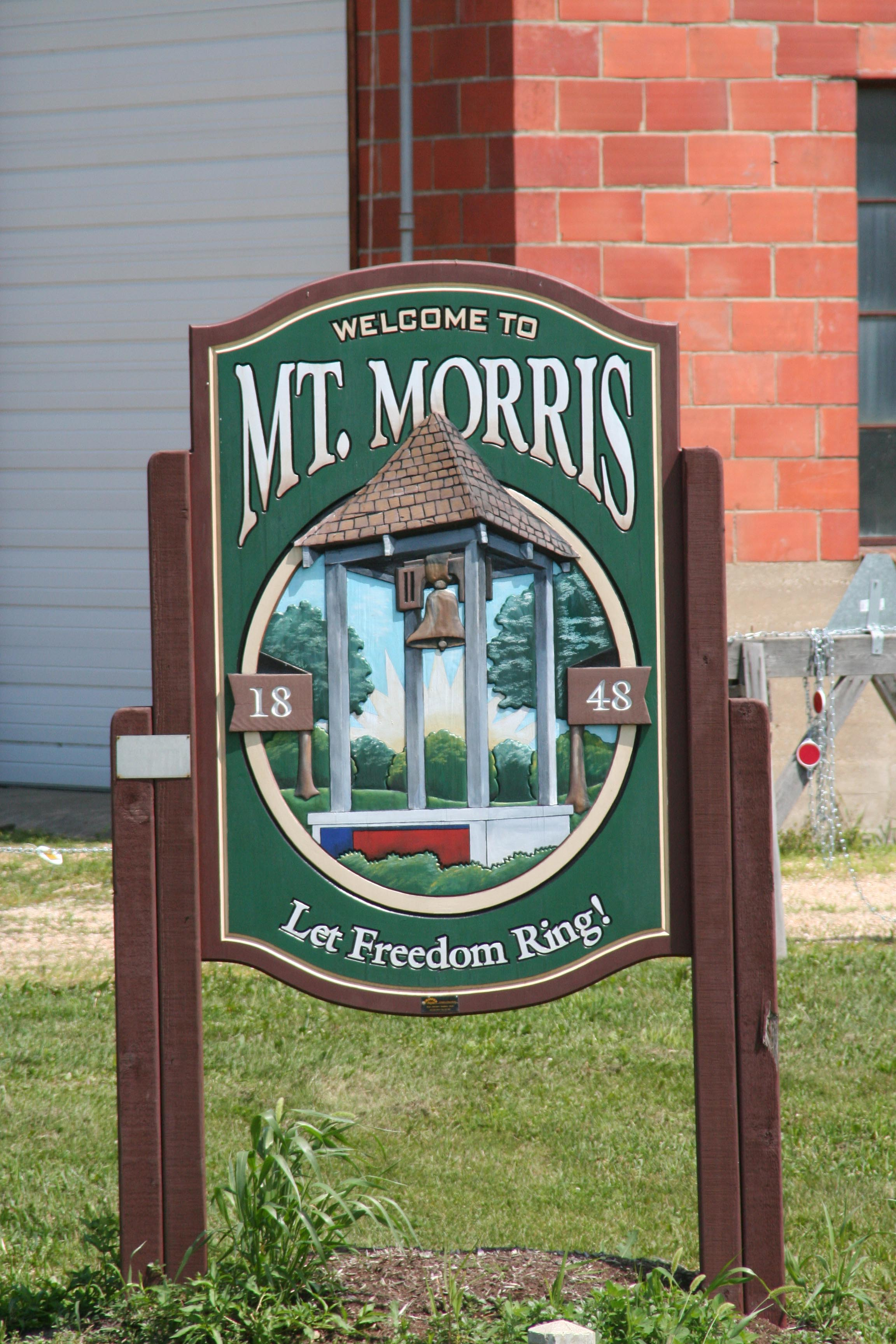
- Sign leading on Rt. 64 leading into Mount Morris
- Motto: Let Freedom Ring
- Location of Mount Morris in Ogle County, Illinois.

- Location within Ogle County Mount Morris (Illinois)
- Coordinates: 42°02′54″N 89°25′46″W
- Country: United States
- State: Illinois
- County: Ogle
- Township: Mt. Morris

Area
  - Total: 1.56 sq mi (4.04 km^{2})
  - Land: 1.56 sq mi (4.04 km^{2})
  - Water: 0 sq mi (0.00 km^{2})
- Elevation: 912 ft (278 m)

Population (2020)
  - Total: 2,861
  - Density: 1,834.2/sq mi (708.18/km^{2})
- Time zone: UTC-6 (CST)
  - Summer (DST): UTC-5 (CDT)
- Zip code: 61054
- Area code: 815
- FIPS code: 17-50998
- GNIS feature ID: 2399413
- Website: mtmorrisil.net

Mount Morris is a village in Mount Morris Township, Ogle County, Illinois, United States. As of the 2020 census, Mount Morris had a population of 2,861.

== History ==
Mt. Morris is home of the Illinois Freedom Bell, which is located in the town square. The area that is now the town square used to be the campus of one of Illinois' first institutes of higher learning, Mount Morris College. It was first a Methodist school and was later affiliated with the Church of the Brethren. The college closed due to hard economic times. The village's old Junior High School, while undergoing demolition, caught fire and burned forcing the school district to be merged with the Oregon School District in 1994. On February 12, 2004, the Rahn Elementary School was lost to fire. This resulted in the reorganization of the Oregon School District. The former Oregon city elementary and middle schools were merged into a single elementary school. The Mt. Morris Highschool has since been used as the middle school for the district. The town is also home of a very large group of lustron homes in IL. These can be located on First street (5 houses), Hannah avenue (3 houses), and Sunset lane (5 houses). The town has a total of 18 lustrons. The houses were built here to meet a shortage of housing for a local printing company.

== Geography ==
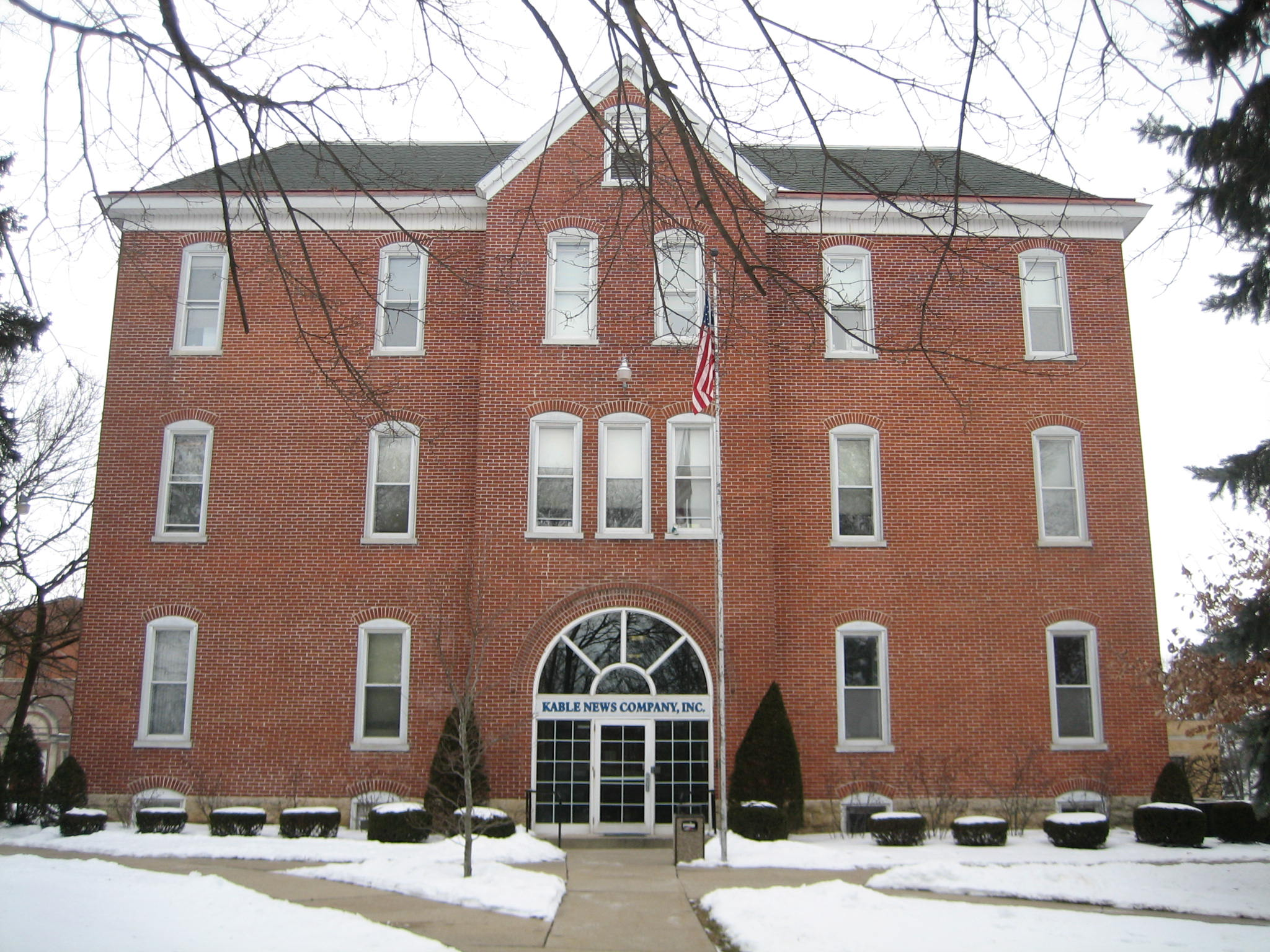
Mount Morris has long been known as a publishing center, this image is of the Kable News Company building.

According to the 2010 census, Mount Morris has a total area of 1.5 square miles (3.88 km^{2}), all land.

The village is crossed from east to west by Illinois Route 64. Route 64 continues eastward to Chicago and westward into Iowa, where it keeps its numeric designation.

== Demographics ==
Historical population
Census	Pop.	Note	%±
1880	855		—
1890	895		4.7%
1900	1,048		17.1%
1910	1,132		8.0%
1920	1,250		10.4%
1930	1,902		52.2%
1940	2,304		21.1%
1950	2,709		17.6%
1960	3,075		13.5%
1970	3,173		3.2%
1980	2,989		−5.8%
1990	2,919		−2.3%
2000	3,013		3.2%
2010	2,998		−0.5%
2020	2,861		−4.6%
U.S. Decennial Census

=== 2020 census ===
As of the 2020 census, Mount Morris had a population of 2,861. The median age was 46.5 years. 20.4% of residents were under the age of 18 and 26.2% of residents were 65 years of age or older. For every 100 females there were 85.4 males, and for every 100 females age 18 and over there were 85.2 males age 18 and over.

0.0% of residents lived in urban areas, while 100.0% lived in rural areas.

There were 1,313 households in Mount Morris, of which 23.3% had children under the age of 18 living in them. Of all households, 37.9% were married-couple households, 21.8% were households with a male householder and no spouse or partner present, and 31.5% were households with a female householder and no spouse or partner present. About 39.8% of all households were made up of individuals and 21.2% had someone living alone who was 65 years of age or older.

There were 1,429 housing units, of which 8.1% were vacant. The homeowner vacancy rate was 1.5% and the rental vacancy rate was 9.0%.

Racial composition as of the 2020 census
Race	Number	Percent
White	2,614	91.4%
Black or African American	27	0.9%
American Indian and Alaska Native	1	0.0%
Asian	8	0.3%
Native Hawaiian and Other Pacific Islander	0	0.0%
Some other race	47	1.6%
Two or more races	164	5.7%
Hispanic or Latino (of any race)	218	7.6%

=== 2000 census ===
As of the census of 2000, there were 3,013 people, 1,259 households, and 810 families residing in the village. The population density was 2,585.1 inhabitants per square mile (998.1/km^{2}). There were 1,337 housing units at an average density of 1,147.1 per square mile (442.9/km^{2}). The racial makeup of the village was 97.15% White, 0.17% African American, 0.20% Native American, 0.43% Asian, 0.13% Pacific Islander, 1.00% from other races, and 0.93% from two or more races. Hispanic or Latino of any race were 2.75% of the population.

There were 1,259 households, out of which 29.3% had children under the age of 18 living with them, 50.8% were married couples living together, 10.6% had a female householder with no husband present, and 35.6% were non-families. 32.2% of all households were made up of individuals, and 14.9% had someone living alone who was 65 years of age or older. The average household size was 2.28 and the average family size was 2.86.

In the village, the population was spread out, with 23.8% under the age of 18, 7.3% from 18 to 24, 26.5% from 25 to 44, 19.9% from 45 to 64, and 22.5% who were 65 years of age or older. The median age was 40 years. For every 100 females, there were 90.8 males. For every 100 females age 18 and over, there were 86.0 males.

The median income for a household in the village was $41,333, and the median income for a family was $51,019. Males had a median income of $39,323 versus $20,840 for females. The per capita income for the village was $20,326. About 6.0% of families and 6.9% of the population were below the poverty line, including 13.2% of those under age 18 and 5.9% of those age 65 or over.

== Recreation ==
Parks include Dillehay Park, Mounder Park, and Zickuhr Park. Dillehay Park is located in the southeast portion of the village. Zickuhr Park is located in the western part of town, and has one softball diamond, basketball courts, and an array of playground equipment. Mounder Park houses a skating park, a pavilion, and the playground equipment that was donated and relocated by the school after the Rahn Elementary School fire.

== Education ==
It is in the Oregon Community Unit School District 220.

== Notable people ==
- Akiane Kramarik, painter; born in Mount Morris
- Henry C. Newcomer, U.S. Army brigadier general, raised in Mount Morris
- Nels Potter, pitcher for five Major League Baseball teams; born in Mount Morris
- Nelson Thomas Potter, Jr., university professor and scholar
- Elaine Roe, U.S. Army Second lieutenant, and one of four Army Nurses to receive the Silver Star in World War II. Resided in Mount Morris
- Ralph Waldo Trine, educator and philosopher
- W. H. L. Wallace, Civil War general; lived in Mount Morris

== See also ==
- Samuel M. Hitt House
- White Pines Forest State Park
- White Pines State Park Lodge and Cabins
