= Black Hawk State Historic Site =

State park in Illinois, USA

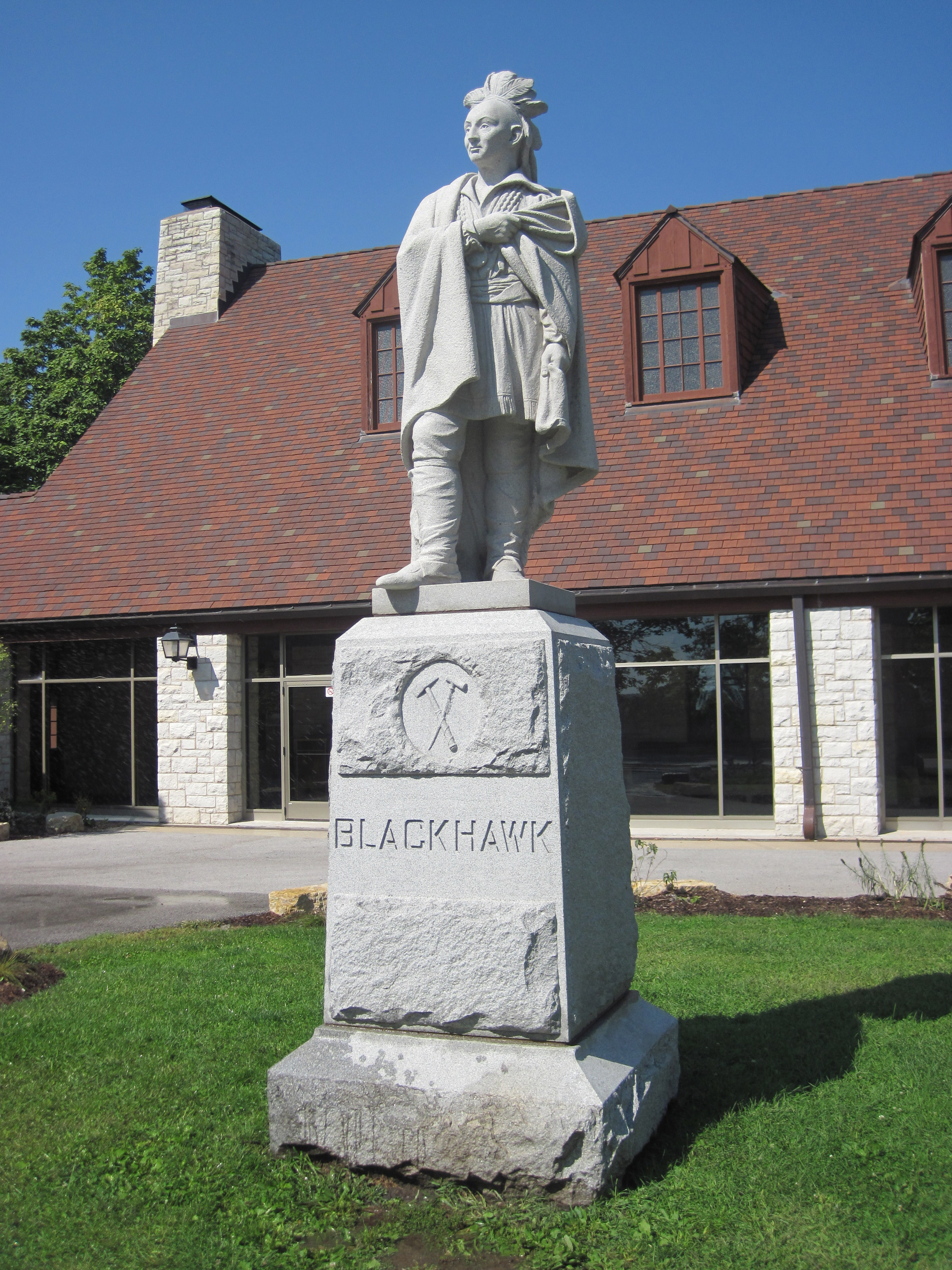
- Statue of Black Hawk, Black Hawk State Historic Site, by Welsh sculptor David Richards.

- Location within Illinois
- Location: Rock Island, Illinois
- Coordinates: 41.4673°N 90.5718°W
- Owner: Illinois Historic Preservation Division

The Black Hawk State Historic Site, in Rock Island, Illinois, is adjacent to the historic site of the village of Saukenuk, the home of a band of the Sauk people. It includes the John Hauberg Museum of Native American Life. The state park is located on a 150-foot (50 m) bluff overlooking the Rock River in western Illinois. It is most famous for being the birthplace of the Sauk warrior Black Hawk. The disputed cession of this area to the U.S. government was the catalyst for the Black Hawk War.

== History ==
=== Under the Sauk ===
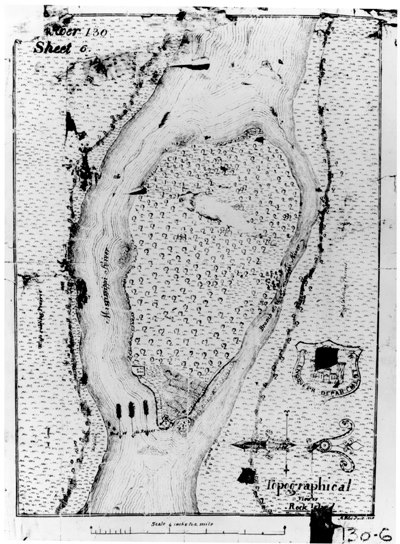
Map of Rock Island at Saukenuk, 1820

The Sauk nation occupied this site as their principal village, called "Saukenuk". It was a well-drained area, suitable for growing corn. The Sauk had arrived by 1750, probably after the Fox Wars (1712–1733). When the explorer Jonathan Carver reached Saukenuk in 1766, he called it "the largest and best built Indian town" he had ever seen, "more like a civilized town than the abode of savages."

The Sauk successfully farmed the area during part of the year and spent the winters in camps down and across the Mississippi collecting fur-bearing animals. Sauk hunters skinned their catches and sold the peltry to fur traders from the Great Lakes. From 1763 on, these traders were mostly British, and from the 1780s on, most of them were employees or contractors of the Canada-based North West Company. In the spring, the Sauk gathered in sugar camps for maple sugaring before returning to the village (left empty since the fall) to plant crops and bury their dead.

The Sauk developed military and economic ties with British North America. Due to these ties, the Sauk expected British military assistance. Some of the Sauk traveled every year to British forts on far-away Lake Superior and near Detroit for trading and gift-giving.

A disputed 1804 St. Louis Treaty between Quashquame and William Henry Harrison led to the transfer of Illinois lands to the U.S. Government, including Saukenuk. The Sauk did not consider this treaty valid, and they continued to live at the village.

When Thomas Forsyth arrived in Saukenuk in 1817, he described it as the most populous Indian village he had ever seen.

By 1826, an estimated 4,800 Sauk lived in and around Saukenuk. Others who passed through, such as William H. Keating, noted that the village was not limited to the Sauk. Keating estimated only about 20% of the warriors that the Sauk could muster had pure Sauk ancestry. It was the largest single settlement in the new U.S. state of Illinois. This is how Black Hawk described Saukenuk:

Our village was situated on the north side of Rock river, at the foot of its rapids, and on the point of land between Rock river and the Mississippi. . . . The land around our village, uncultivated, was covered with blue-grass, which made excellent pasture for our horses. Several fine springs broke out of the bluff, near by, from which we were supplied with good water. The rapids of Rock river furnished us with an abundance of excellent fish, and the land, being good, never failed to produce good crops of corn, beans, pumpkins, and squashes. We always had plenty – our children never cried with hunger, nor our people were never in want. Here our village had stood for more than a hundred years.

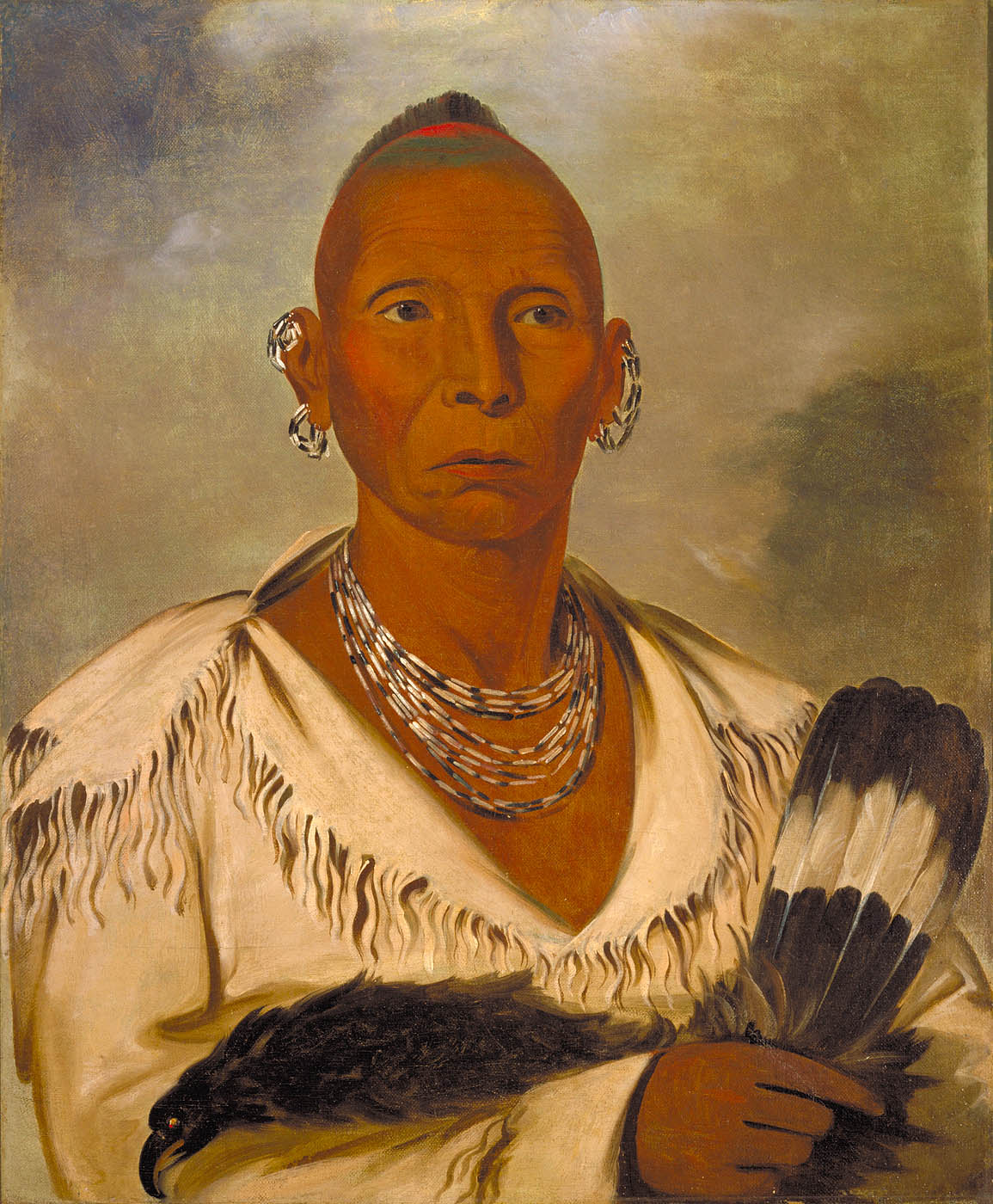
Black Hawk led the Sauk and Meskwaki peoples in many battles from the War of 1812 to the Black Hawk War of 1832. Painting by artist George Catlin.

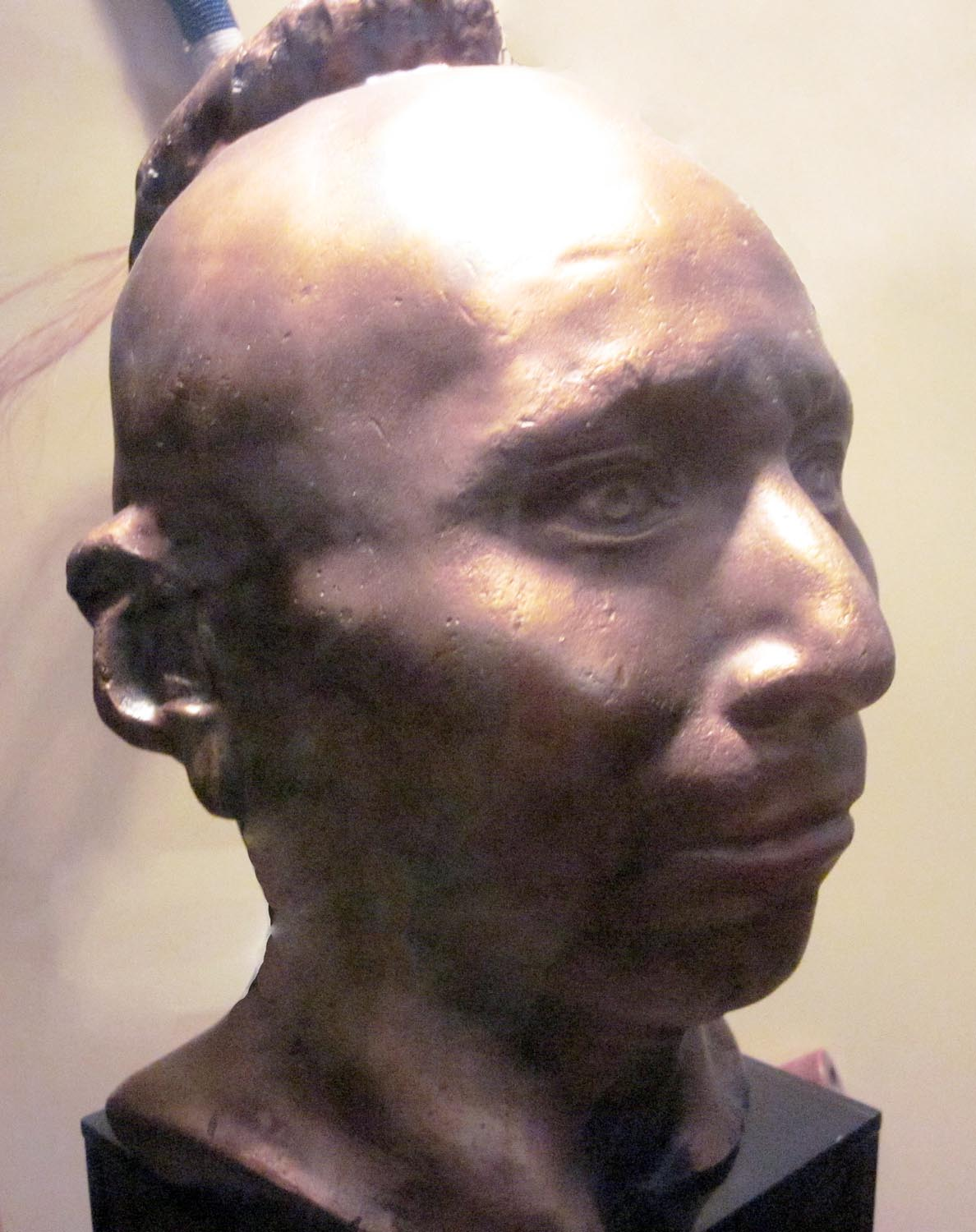
Plaster life cast of Black Hawk, original ca. 1830, at Black Hawk State Historic Site

=== Black Hawk War ===
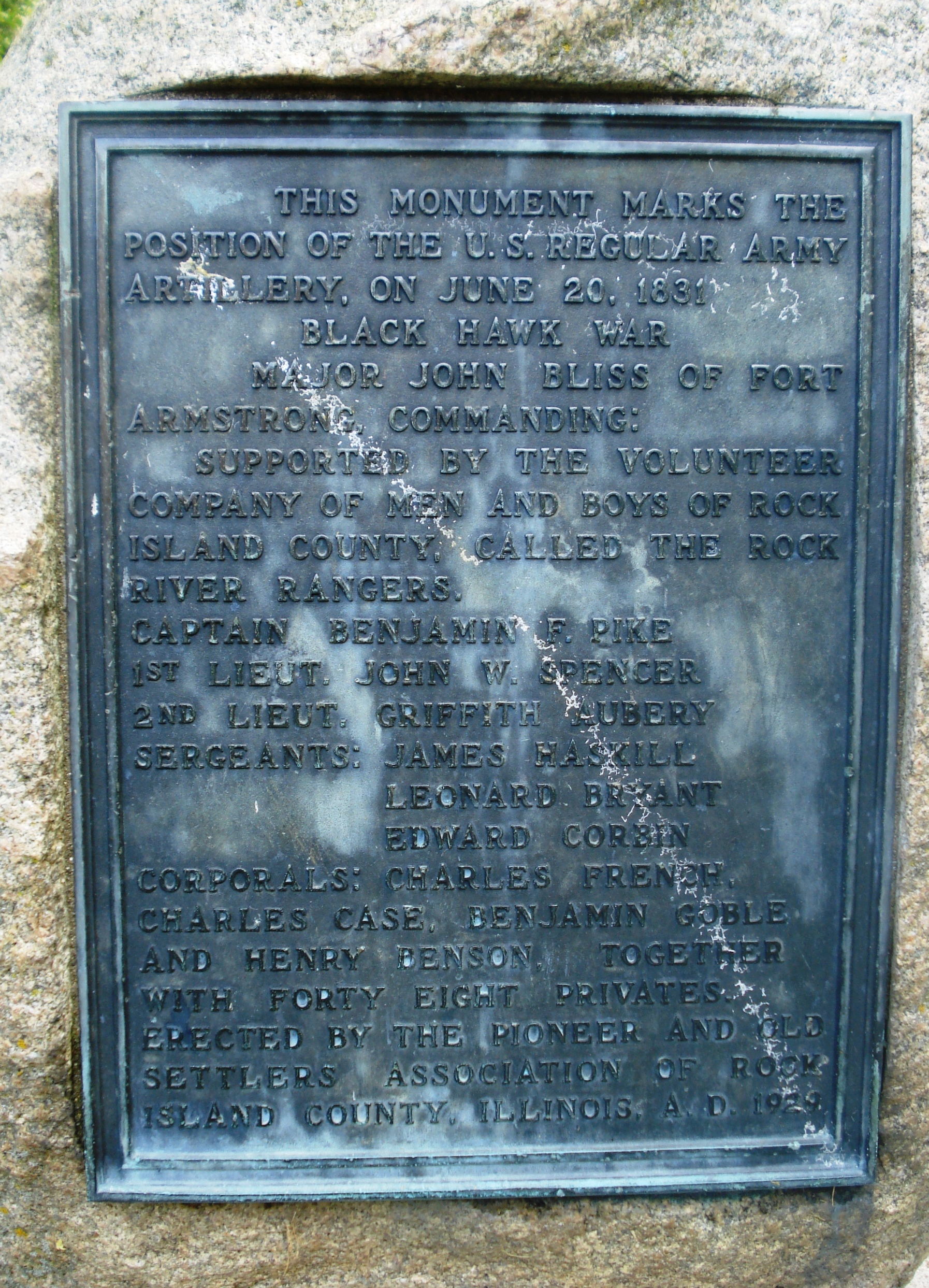
Black Hawk War Memorial at Black Hawk State Historic Site

The spread of American settlers into Illinois and up the Mississippi River doomed the village. In multiple treaties, many of the Sauk had signed land cessions that sold the land under Saukenuk to the new American nation. Part of the tribe established new villages in Iowa and in Missouri nearer their winter hunting grounds.

The campaign of 1832 led to a complete victory for the U.S. Army and the state of Illinois. Many of Black Hawk's followers were killed and the Quad Cities region was completely opened to settlement. However, many white Americans admired Black Hawk's courage in defense of his band's ancestral lands, and the native leader was elevated to the rank of a folk hero.

A statue of Black Hawk was raised on the site in 1892, and the Civilian Conservation Corps redeveloped and improved the park in 1934–1942.

=== Village site today ===
The last couple of blocks on the southern portion of 11th street Rock Island (U.S. Route 67) now cover the former site of the Sauk village of Saukenuk, with Black Hawk State Historic Site and John Hauberg Museum of Native American Life slightly to the east. Saukenuk had strong ties with the Meskwaki village to the north, what is now downtown Rock Island. Vandruff Island in the Rock River to the south of the village was also a place in which villagers spent their days. The island is now mainly a 180-foot-deep quarry with some residential development on the west side. The historic site is served by Illinois Route 5, which intersects with Interstate 74 in nearby Moline, Illinois.

== John Hauberg Museum of Native American Life ==
The Hauberg Museum specializes in Sauk and Meskwaki cultural objects and artifacts. The museum is located in a lodge constructed in 1934 by the Civilian Conservation Corps and was named after John Hauberg, a philanthropist from Rock Island. Exhibits include full-size replicas of Sauk winter and summer houses, dioramas depicting Native life typical of the period from 1750 to 1830, trade goods, jewelry and domestic items, and several Black Hawk artifacts, including his tomahawk, two of his clay tobacco pipes, and a bronze bust fashioned from a plaster life mask.

== Singing Bird Nature Center ==
The Singing Bird Nature Center offers educational programs in the northwest section of the park. One section of the building is dedicated to the study of local native birds. The nature center is named after Black Hawk's wife Asshewaqua meaning Singing Bird.
