= Bust of Stephen Neal =

Public artwork by Clara Barth Leonard

Stephen Neal
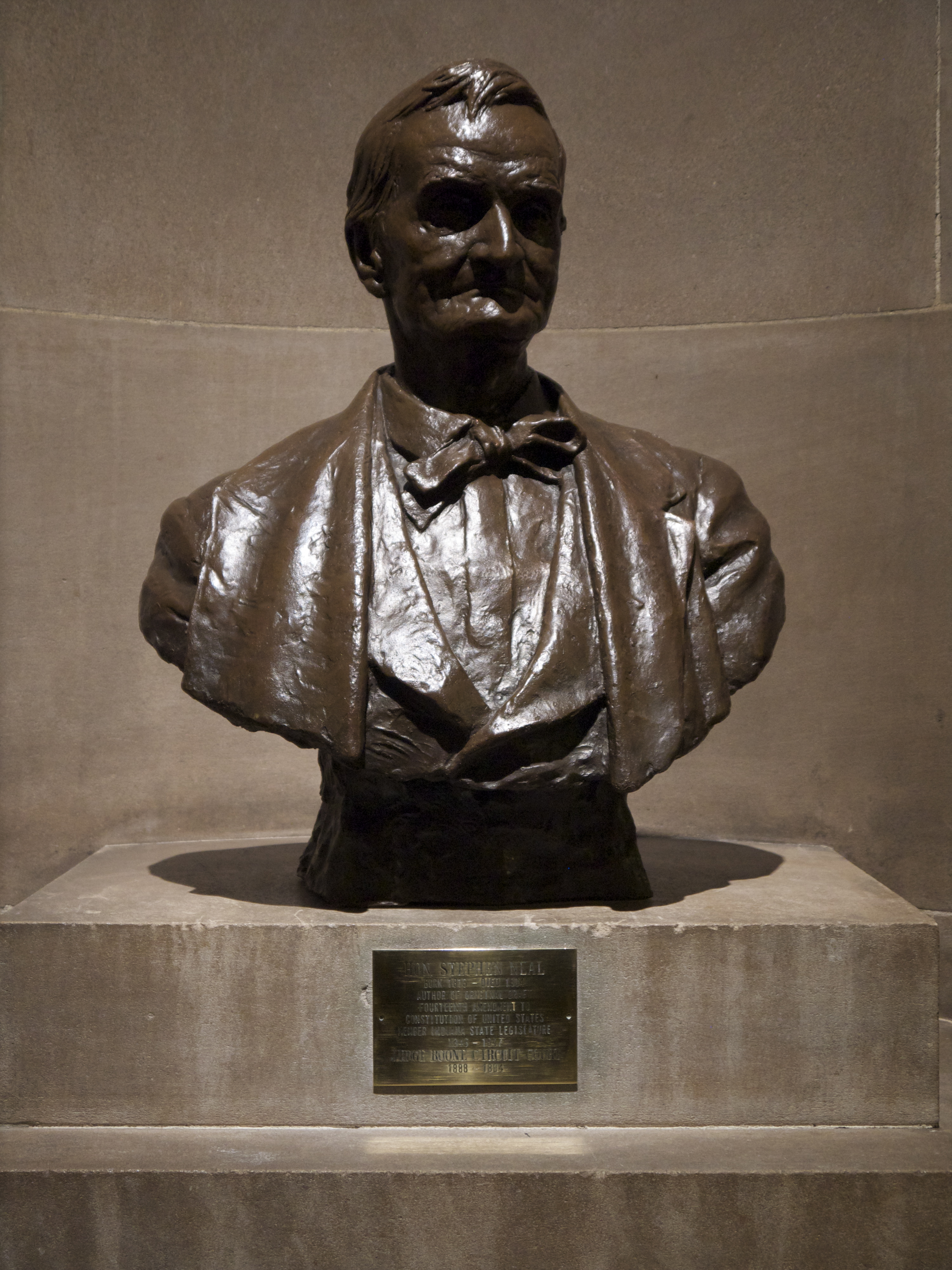
- Artist: Clara Barth Leonard
- Year: 1907
- Type: Bronze
- Dimensions: 69 cm × 61 cm × 38 cm (27 in × 24 in × 15 in)
- Location: Indiana Statehouse; Indianapolis, Indiana, United States
- Owner: State of Indiana

Stephen Neal is a public artwork by Indiana artist Clara Barth Leonard. It is located in the Indiana Statehouse, which is in Indianapolis, Indiana, United States. The subject of the work is Stephen Neal, a member of the Indiana State Legislature and a Judge of the Boone County Circuit Court during the mid-to-late-19th century, as well as being the author of the original draft of the Fourteenth Amendment to the United States Constitution. The bronze bust is located on the second floor of the Indiana Statehouse in a waist-high limestone niche, and faces west towards North Senate Avenue.

== Description ==
Stephen Neal is a bronze sculpture 27 inches (69 cm) high, 24 inches (61 cm) wide and 15 inches (38 cm) deep which depicts an elderly man wearing a shirt and vest, a formal frock coat with wide lapels and a stock tie. The subject, Stephen Neal, has a beaked nose, furrowed brow, deep-set eyes and sunken cheeks. His hair is parted on the proper left, and its ends brush the tops of his ears. He directs his gaze up and towards the proper left over the viewer's right shoulder. The proper right shoulder of the bust droops slightly lower than the proper left. On the proper left side of the base, which is roughly modeled, the artist has signed her name, along with the date that the artwork was completed. In cursive script, it reads 'Clara Barth Leonard,' with the year '1907' carved into the bronze just beneath the signature. Three blocks of limestone, each successively smaller, are cemented into the limestone niche which houses the bust. The base of the bust sits on top of the smallest block, in the middle and towards the front, roughly 2" from the ledge. A bronze plaque identifying the subject of the sculpture is located below the bust in the middle of the topmost limestone block. Its inscription reads:

Hon. Stephen Neal
Born 1816 – Died 1904
Author of Original Draft
Fourteenth Amendment to
Constitution of United States
Member Indiana State Legislature
1846–1847
Judge Boone Circuit Court
1888–1894

== Historical information ==
The bust of Judge Stephen Neal was commissioned in 1907, along with two other copies, by Charles Neal, one of Judge Neal's sons. Mr. Neal chose a local Indiana artist named Clara Barth Leonard to execute the three works, one of which was presented to the Indiana State Library, the second of which was presented to the Lebanon, Indiana library, and the third of which remained in his possession. The third bust was eventually presented to the Boone County Courthouse in Lebanon, Indiana. A small plaster cast of Stephen Neal was donated to the Indianapolis Museum of Art by Clara Barth Leonard, and is listed in the collection, though it has been lost since 1929.

In order to create the most accurate portrait of Judge Neal, who had by this time been dead for three years, Clara Barth Leonard (later Sorensen, then Dieman) sculpted the facial features using photographs of him taken during life, as well as his death mask. A lifelong friend of Judge Neal, Louis Gibson, shared his suggestions as well, later praising Leonard for her efforts. In late 1907, Leonard exhibited the bust at the Herron Art Institute, along with a number of studies of heads. A contemporary newspaper article notes that Charles H. Niehaus, sculptor of the statue of Benjamin Harrison, spoke about the bronze bust of Judge Neal "in most complimentary terms" after having seen it at the Herron exhibit.

The bust of Judge Neal was presented to the Indiana State Library during a ceremony conducted on July 10, 1908, at 10 o'clock in the morning. The ceremony was attended by a small number of interested parties, including Charles Neal and Clara Barth Leonard. Union B. Hunt, Secretary of State at the time, gave a stirring speech regarding Stephen Neal and his contributions to the State of Indiana, namely as the author of the original draft of the Fourteenth Amendment to the United States Constitution. Mr. Hunt had high praise for Clara Barth Leonard, stating in his speech that, "she has done her work faithfully [which] is evidenced by the highly intellectual face, and the kindly and unassuming expression of the features which were so characteristic of Judge Neal." Demarchus C. Brown, Indiana State Librarian, accepted the gift on behalf of the State Library, remarking that he "was gratified...that there are artists in the state qualified to design and execute such memorials as that presented."

=== Location history ===
For a number of years, it had been impossible to publicly display Stephen Neal at the Indiana State Library because of a lack of available space. In 1930, Indiana State Librarian Louis J. Bailey transferred several pieces of art, including the bust of Judge Neal, to the custodian of the Indiana Statehouse with the permission of Governor Harry G. Leslie. There, it would be installed in one of the empty niches which surrounds the Statehouse rotunda.

=== Acquisition ===
In 1930, the Indiana Statehouse acquired the bust from the Indiana State Library. It is now considered property of the State of Indiana.

== Artist ==
Clara Barth Leonard Sorenson Dieman (1877–1959) was a relatively unknown sculptor, painter and teacher from Indianapolis, Indiana. She was a student of well-known artists such as William Forsyth, Alexander Archipenko and Lorado Taft, who she worked on Fountain of Time with. Between 1907 and 1916, Leonard taught introductory sculpture classes at the John Herron Art Institute in Indianapolis. In 1917, she graduated from the Art Institute of Chicago, where she had been a student of Taft's, and she later studied at Columbia University as well.

During her career as a sculptor, Leonard Sorensen Dieman frequently worked in portraiture, completing a bas-relief of William A. Bell for the Indianapolis school of the same name, and in 1916, a bronze memorial plaque in honor of Shortridge High School custodian James Biddy. She participated in a number of art exhibitions across the United States, including in Chicago, Illinois, New York City, Philadelphia, Pennsylvania, and Santa Fe, New Mexico, where she spent the latter part of her life.
