= Lincoln Lawyer =

Lincoln Lawyer may refer to:

- The Lincoln Lawyer, a 2005 novel by Michael Connelly
- The Lincoln Lawyer (film), a 2011 American adaptation of the novel
- The Lincoln Lawyer (TV series), a 2022–present American legal drama

== See also ==
- Lincoln the Lawyer, a statue in Urbana, Illinois, U.S.
