= LaFayette Fountain =

Coordinates: 40.4189°N 86.8933°W

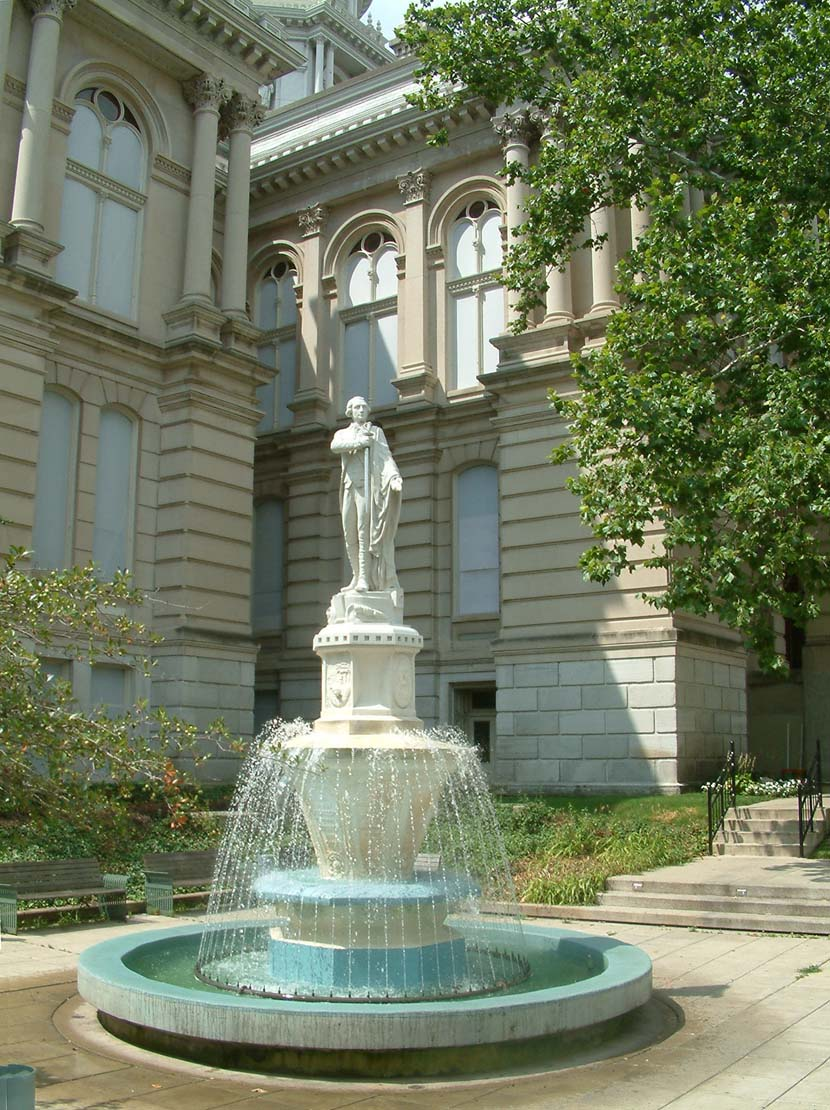
- Artist: Lorado Taft
- Year: 1887
- Type: marble
- Dimensions: 4.9 m diameter (16 ft); figure 6 ft × 3 ft × 3 ft (1.83 m × 0.91 m × 0.91 m), pedestal 12 ft (3.7 m) and 6 ft 2 in (1.88 m) diameter
- Location: Lafayette, Indiana

Lafayette Fountain is an 1887 fountain by sculptor Lorado Taft, in the grounds of the Tippecanoe County Courthouse in Lafayette, Indiana. The fountain is composed of a number of tiered bowls with a marble statue of the Marquis de LaFayette on top. He holds a sword next to his heart in his right hand and has a cape draped over his left arm.

== History ==
Taft wrote about this early commission (perhaps his first) of his that:

"The LaFayette" was about the first order I had in Chicago as I arrived there with high hopes – and little else – the first day of 1886. It was a copy of Bartholdi's "LaFayette" in New York City that was required of me and one tiny photograph of that figure was all that was given to me for data. I wonder at the temerity of youth, but I had to have the money and that supplies unlimited courage.

The fountain cost $2,200.

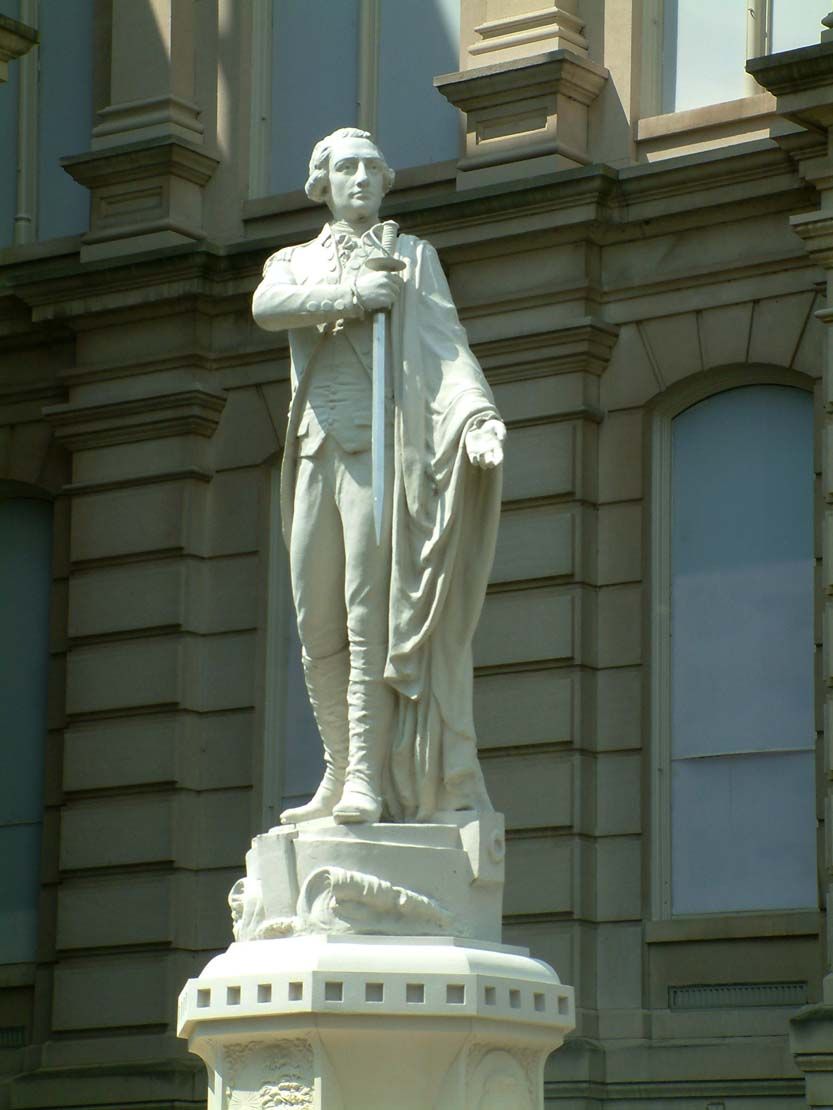
figure

The Inscription reads: (On eight panels on pedestal, raised letters:)

(panel 1:)
In HONOR OF GENERAL
MARIE JEAN
PAUL ROCH YVES
GILBERT MOTIER
DE LAFAYETTE
BORN IN
AUVERGNE
FRANCE
1757
FOUGHT WITH
WASHINGTON
FOR AMERICAN
INDEPENDENCE
1776 TO 1782
DIED 1834

(panel 2:)
ARTESIAN
WELL
CONSTRUCTED BY
TIPPECANOE
COUNTY
COMMENCED
APRIL 22, 1857
COMPLETED
FEBRUARY 18, 1858
DEPTH 230 FEET.

(panel 3:)
IN MEMORY OF
JOHN
PURDUE
WHOSE
MUNIFICENCE
GAVE
NAME TO
PURDUE
UNIVERSITY
BORN 1801
DIED 1876.

(panel 4:)
IN HONOR OF
THE
EARLY
PIONEERS
OF THE
COUNTY
AND
CITY.

(panel 5:)
TIPPECANOE
COUNTY
COURTHOUSES
FIRST
ERECTED 1829
SECOND
ERECTED
1845.
THIRD
ERECTED 1881.

(panel 6:)
IN MEMORY OF
THE
GALLANT
SOLDIERS
OF
TIPPECANOE
COUNTY
WHO FOUGHT
FOR THE UNION.

(panel 7:)
IN MEMORY OF WILLIAM
DIGBY
FOUNDER OF THE
CITY OF
LAFAYETTE
MAY 27, 1825.
BORN 1802
DIED 1864.

(panel 8:)
ERECTED BY
THE
CITY OF
LAFAYETTE
1887.

Water for the fountain was originally supplied by a 230-foot well beneath it, which was installed in 1857 and whose waters were believed to have curative properties. The well was capped in 1936, and the fountain's water now comes from elsewhere.
