= Statue of George Washington (Seattle) =

Statue of George Washington in Seattle, Washington, U.S.

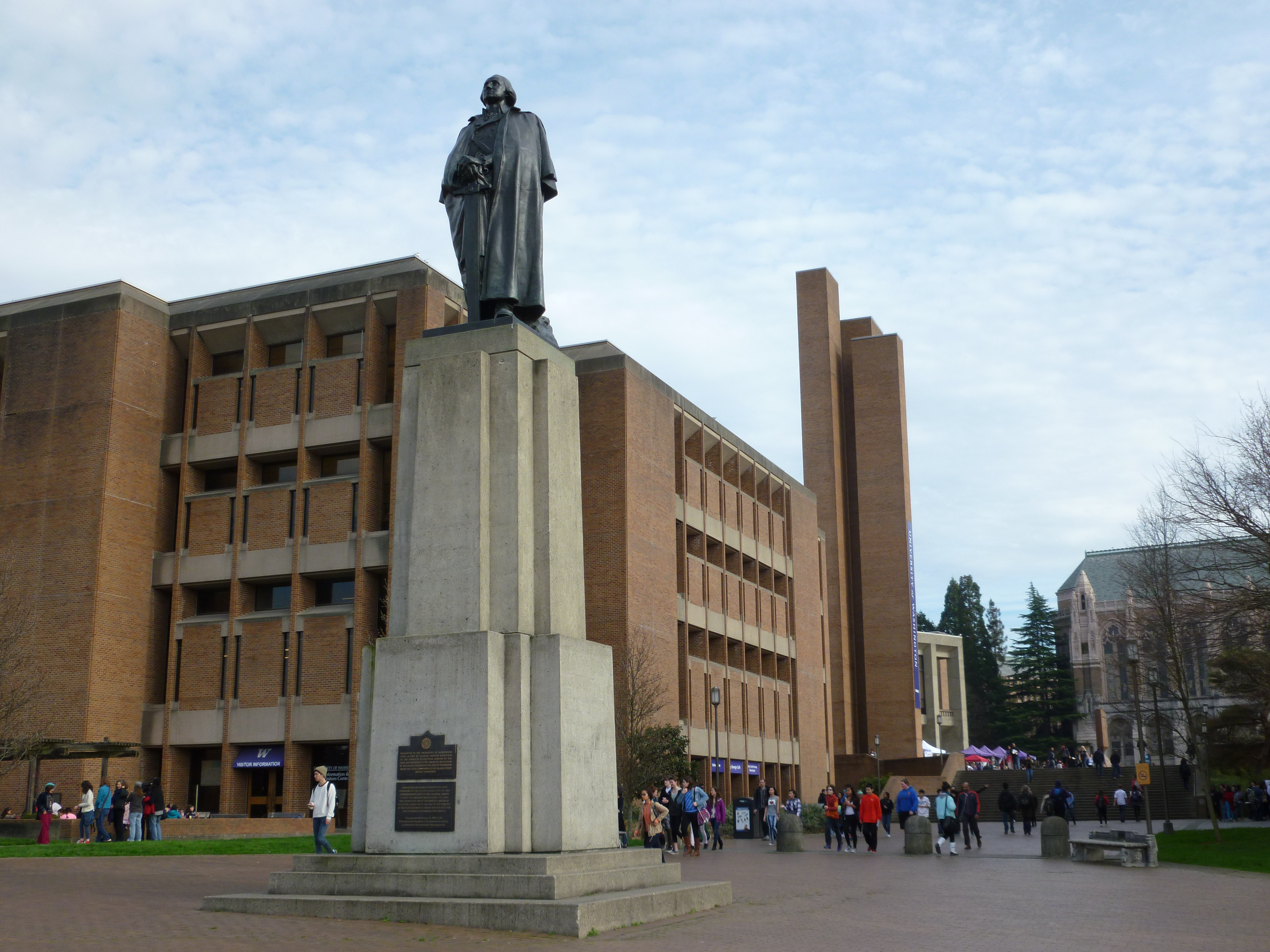
- View from the southwest in 2015
- Artist: Lorado Taft
- Year: 1909
- Type: Sculpture
- Subject: George Washington
- Location: Seattle, Washington, United States; 47.656072°N 122.311131°W

George Washington, also known as the President George Washington Monument, is a bronze sculpture of George Washington by Lorado Taft, installed at the University of Washington campus in Seattle's University District, in the U.S. state of Washington.

== History ==
=== Construction and dedication ===
The statue was dedicated on Flag Day, June 14, 1909, during the Alaska–Yukon–Pacific Exposition. Its permanent 24-foot (7.3 m) pedestal was built by the Works Progress Administration (WPA) and installed in August 1938. The pedestal had been designed by Taft in 1908 but was not funded in time for the exposition.

Located a short distance west of Red Square, the statue faces west, toward The Brothers of the Olympic Mountains.

=== 21st century ===
During the George Floyd protests, A number of student led organizations at the University of Washington called for the statue's removal due to George Washington’s ownership of slaves. Most notably, the Black Student Union and the Black Lives Matter coalition (UW BLM) publicly spoke out against the statue. UW BLM staged a month-long protest of the statue in August 2020, vandalizing the statue every day, by spray-painting it, to induce a response from the administration.

The university's student newspaper The Daily also called for the removal of the statue in an op-ed, noting that a petition to remove the statue has reached over 3,000 signatures. This petition asked for the George Washington statue to be replaced with a Black Power fist and to rename the nearby George Cafe to the Juneteenth Cafe. According to a 2021 poll conducted by KING 5 News that surveyed 650 Washingtonians, 59% wanted the statue to remain, 29% wanted the statue removed, and 11% were unsure.

== See also ==
- 1909 in art
- Campus of the University of Washington
- Cultural depictions of George Washington
- List of monuments dedicated to George Washington
- List of sculptures of presidents of the United States
- List of statues of George Washington
- List of the tallest statues in the United States
