= Clara Sorensen =

American sculptor and painter

Clara Barth Leonard Sorenson Dieman
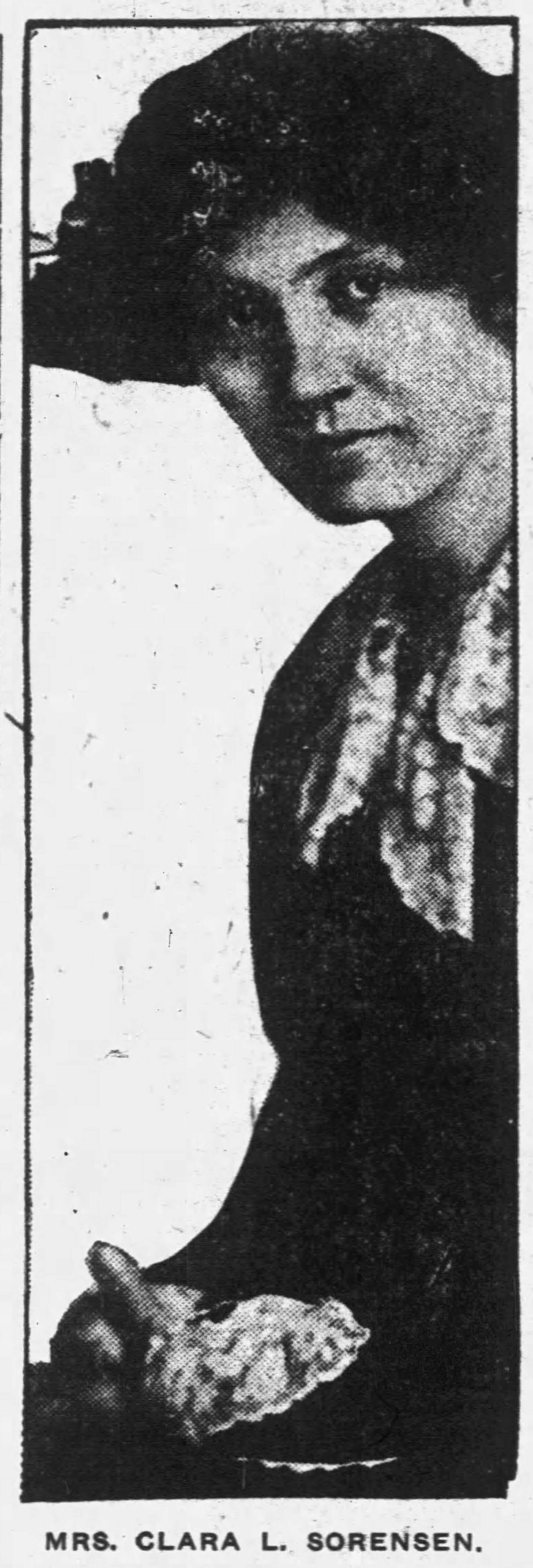
- Born: Clara Barth Leonard; 1877; Indianapolis, Indiana
- Died: 1959 (aged 81–82); Santa Fe, New Mexico
- Known for: Sculpture
- Spouse(s): Niels Sorenson and later Charles Dieman

Clara Barth Leonard Sorenson Dieman (1877–1959) was an American sculptor, painter and teacher from Indianapolis, Indiana.

Sorensen studied at the John Herron Art Institute in Indianapolis and was a student of several well-known artists including William Forsyth, Alexander Archipenko and Lorado Taft, who she worked on Fountain of Time with. She also worked with Victor Brenner. Between 1907 and 1916, Leonard returned to the John Herron Art Institute to teach introductory sculpture classes. In 1917, she graduated from the Art Institute of Chicago, where she had been a student of Taft's, and she later studied at Columbia University as well.

Clara Barth Leonard was married twice, to Niels Sorenson and to Charles Dieman.

During her career as a sculptor, Sorenson frequently worked in portraiture, completing a bas-relief of William A. Bell for the Indianapolis school of the same name, and in 1916, a bronze memorial plaque in honor of Shortridge High School custodian James Biddy. She participated in a number of art exhibitions across the United States, including in Chicago, Illinois, New York, New York, Philadelphia, Pennsylvania, and Santa Fe, New Mexico, where she spent the latter part of her life.

For a while Dieman lived in Denver, Colorado; Taft places her there in 1925 and while there she worked and studied with Robert Garrison at least until 1929.

== Works ==
- Stephen Neal (bust)
