= The Soldiers' Monument (Oregon, Illinois) =

- U.S. Historic district – Contributing property
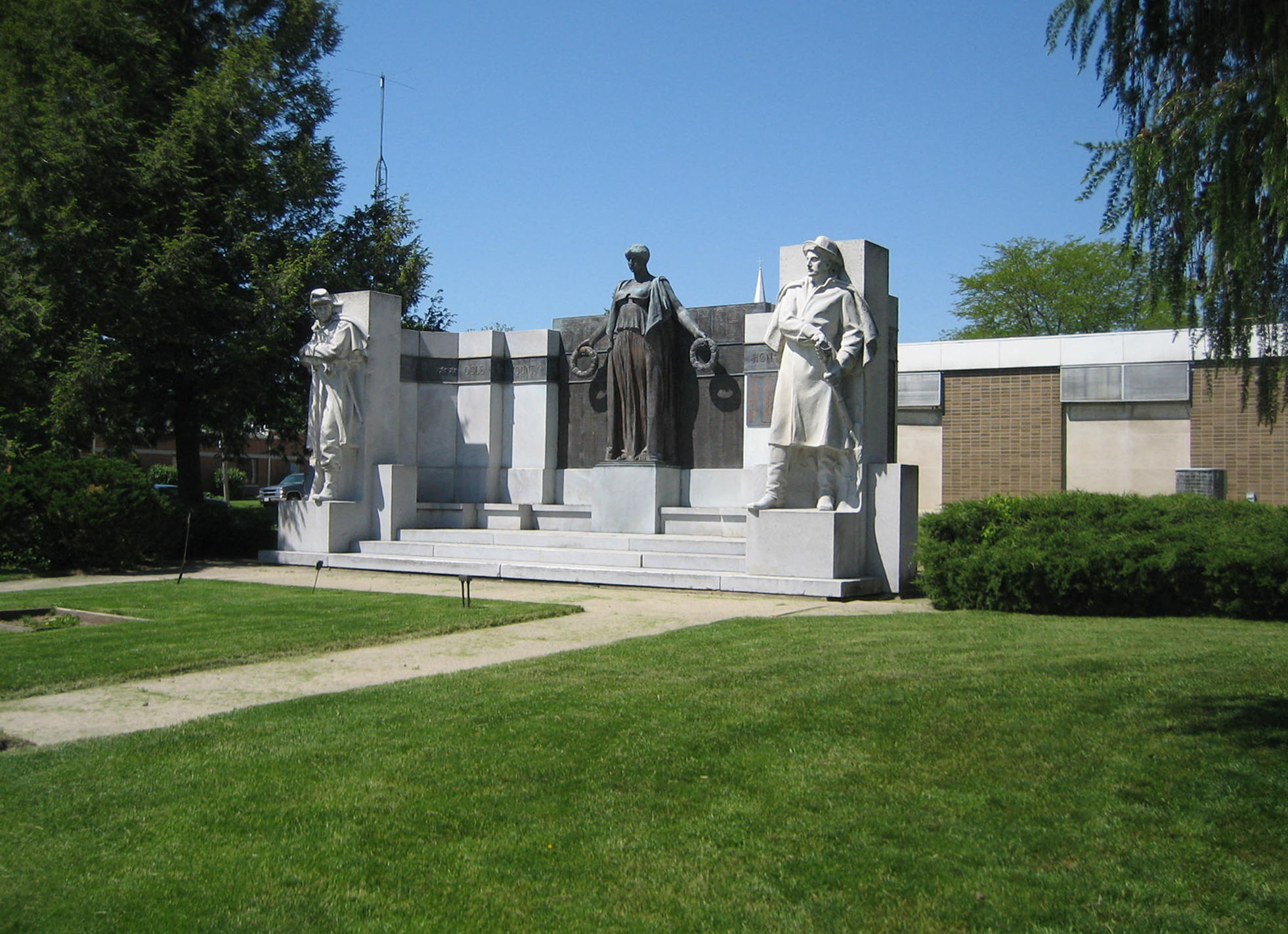
- Lorado Taft's The Soldier's Monument in Oregon, Illinois.
- Location: Oregon, Ogle County, Illinois
- Coordinates: 42°00′49″N 89°19′58.4″W
- Area: Oregon Commercial Historic District
- Built: 1916
- Architect: Pond and Pond
- Sculptor: Lorado Taft
- Part of: Oregon Commercial Historic District (ID06000713)
- Added to NRHP: August 16, 2006

The Soldiers' Monument is a memorial consisting of three statues, one in bronze and two in marble by sculptor Lorado Taft, grouped around an exedra designed by the architectural firm of Pond and Pond. It is located in Oregon, Illinois, the county seat of Ogle County, Illinois. It was dedicated in 1916. The sculpture is part of the Oregon Commercial Historic District. The district was designated and listed on the National Register of Historic Places in August 2006.

== Location ==
This example of public art is located just off Illinois Route 64 as it passes through Oregon. It sits on the southeast side of the Old Ogle County Courthouse square.

== Monument ==
=== Description ===
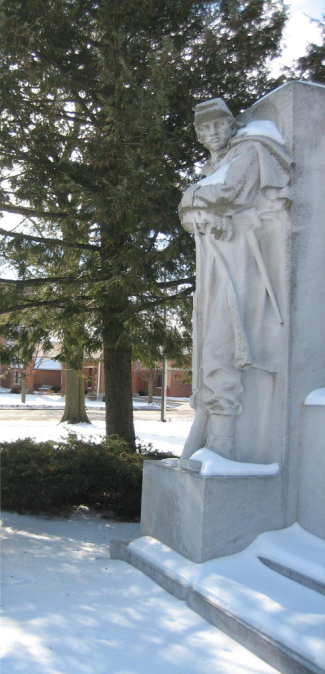
Taft's infantryman stares off toward home.

The eyes are drawn to the centered white marble stairs which lead up to the main part of the monument. At the top of the stairs is the dominating feature of the installation. Taft's oversized Classical female figure stands with her arms outstretched, clutching a laurel wreath in each hand. Behind her is an exedra which was designed by the architects Pond and Pond. The exedra extends around the installation and to either side of the female sculpture are built-in benches. Above the benches are bronze plaques honoring veterans of the Civil War and the Spanish–American War; above the individual war plaques is bronze plating that reads, "Ogle County Honors Her Sons." Flanking the dominant sculpture are two soldiers atop pedestals, one facing north and the other facing south. Tafts's soldiers were cut from marble obtained in the U.S. state of Georgia. The Soldiers' Monument was constructed, on the approval of the Ogle County Board in 1916, for no more than $21,000. Today (2007), this example of the work of Lorado Taft is estimated to be worth over $1,000,000.

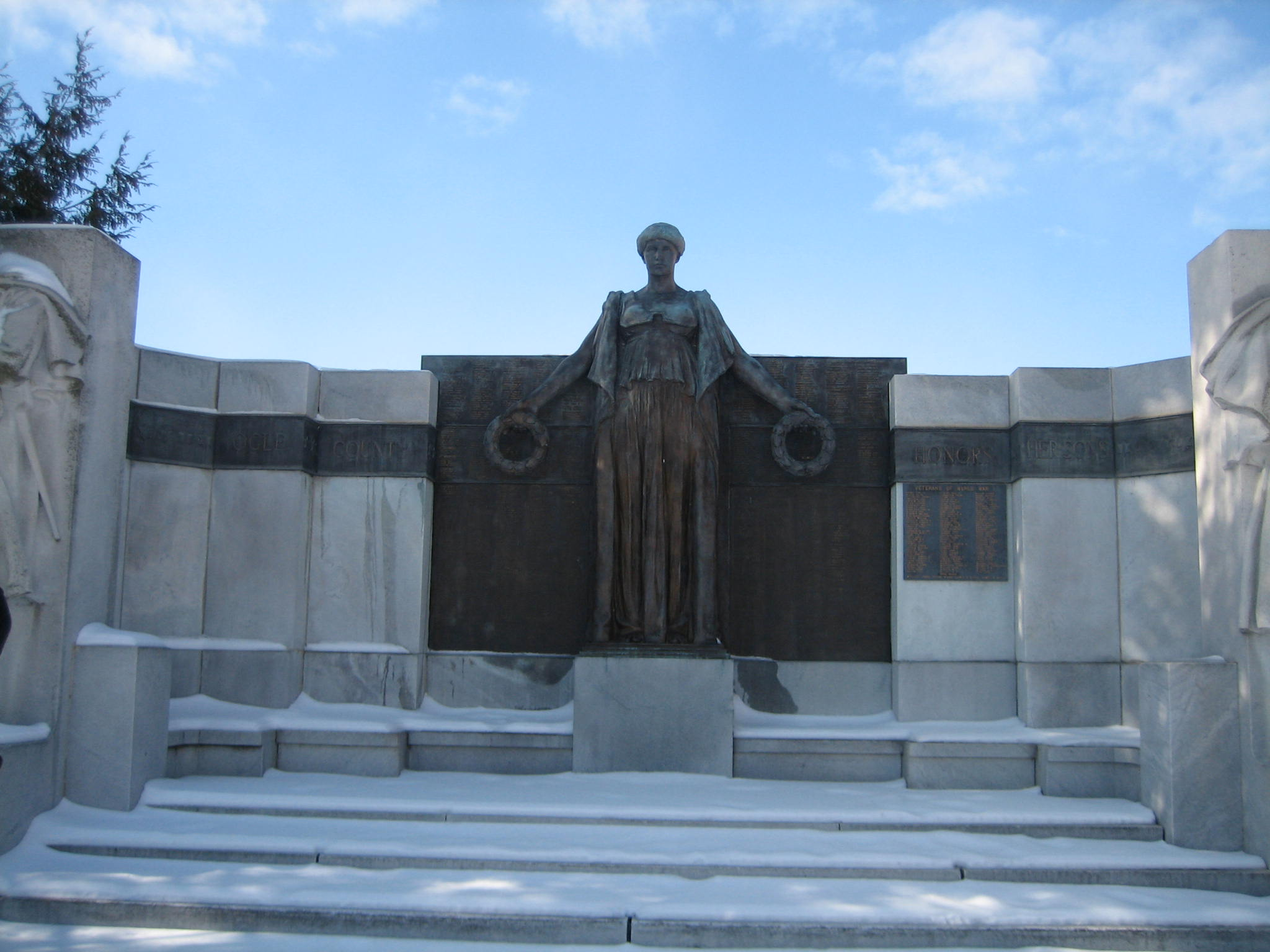
Lorado Taft sculpted the central female figure in bronze.

=== Interpretation ===
The center female bronze figure, holding the laurel wreaths, represents America. The soldier on the south side of the monument is an infantryman and is staring north, toward home. The other soldier, on the north half of the installation, is a cavalry soldier, he is looking south, with his hand on the hilt of his sword. The cavalry soldier is looking toward battle.
