= Thatcher Memorial Fountain =

Sculpture in Denver, Colorado, U.S.

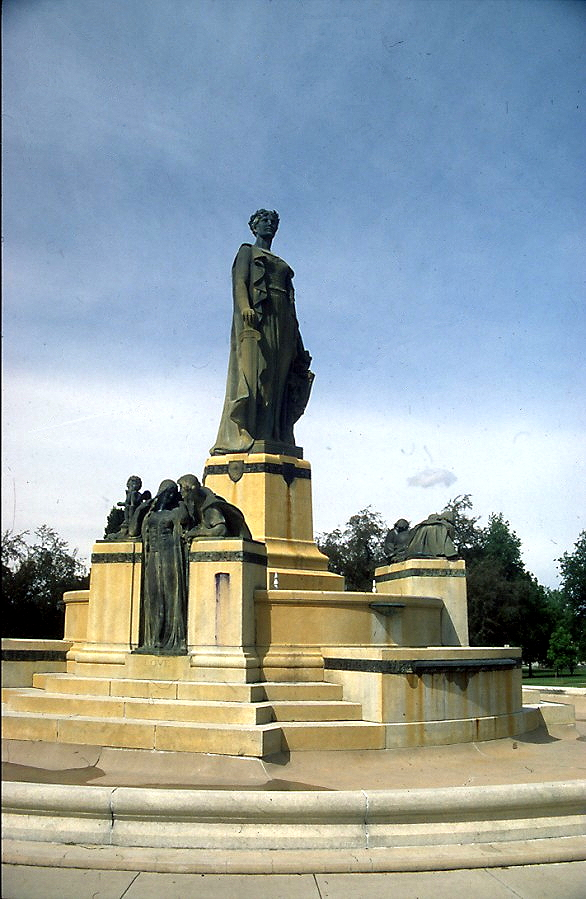
- Artist: Lorado Taft
- Year: 1918
- Medium: Bronze (Sculpture)
- Subject: Joseph Addison
- Location: City Park
- Coordinates: 39°44′41″N 104°57′25″W

Thatcher Memorial Fountain, a fountain located in City Park, Denver, Colorado, was created by sculptor Lorado Taft and dedicated in 1918.

The fountain, dedicated to the memory of Joseph Addison Thatcher who died in 1918 consists of a central figure representing The State or Colorado surrounded by three groups, Loyalty, Love, and Learning.

Joseph Addison Thatcher was a wealthy Denver businessman and banker.
