= The Solitude of the Soul =

Sculptures by Lorado Taft

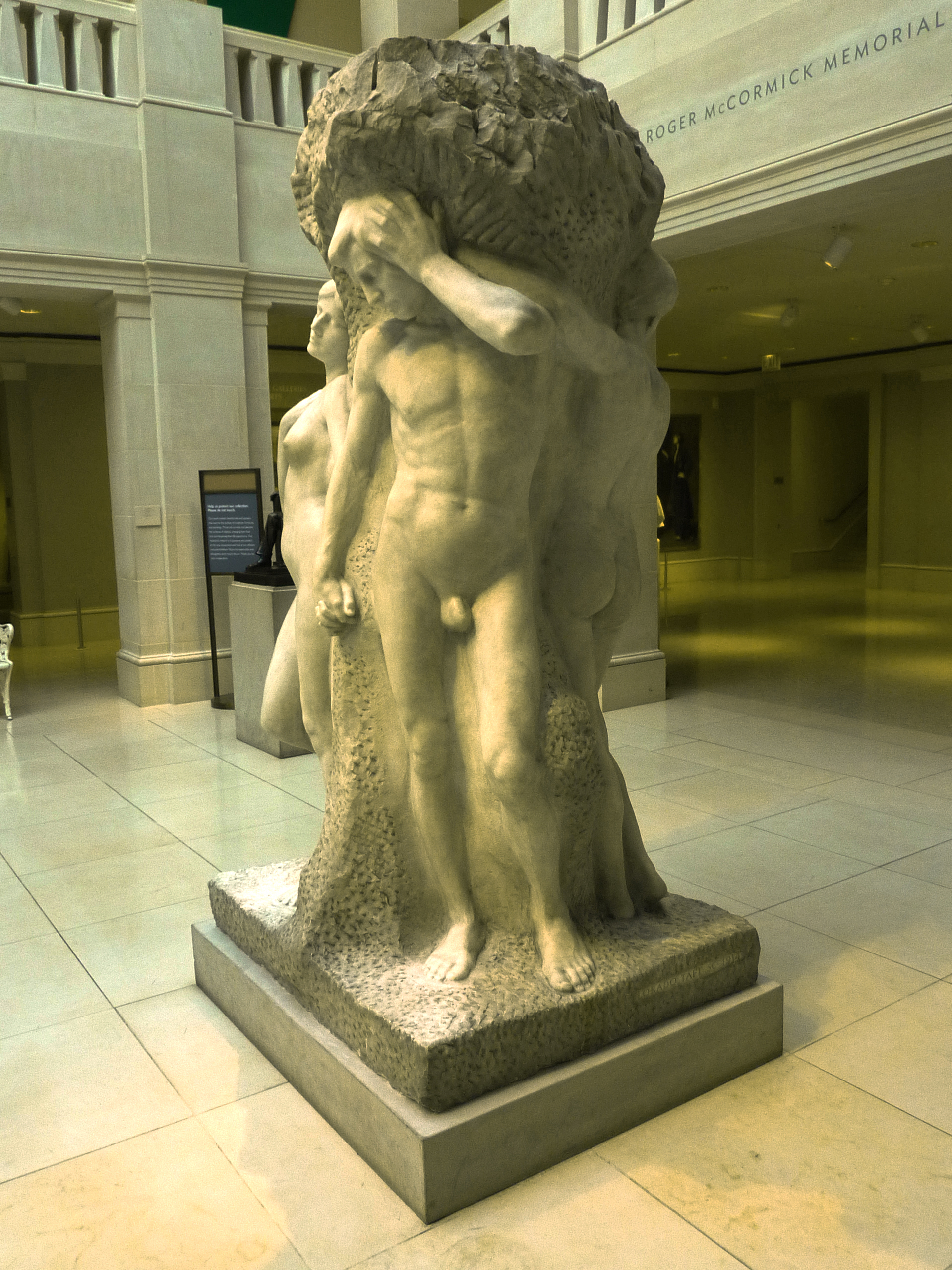
Lorado Taft, The Solitude of the Soul, Art Institute of Chicago.

The Solitude of the Soul refers to one of three known works of sculpture of that name by the American sculptor Lorado Taft, a Midwesterner born in 1860, who was active in the Chicago area from 1885 until his death in 1936. The accompanying photographs show the best-known version, carved in marble and dated 1914, which is among works of American sculpture on display in the Roger McCormick Memorial Court of the Art Institute of Chicago.

Additional photographs, circa 1911, show models of this work in Taft’s studio prior to the First World War.

Taft, an Illinois native who had been classically trained in Paris and who came increasingly under the influence of Auguste Rodin, explained the concept of the statue as follows: "The thought is the eternally present fact that however closely we may be thrown together by circumstances . . . we are unknown to each other."

Two other versions are known to exist. One is a near-same-sized plaster cast, possibly as early as 1901 and probably one of the models shown in the 1911 photographs, now in the collection of American art at the Dayton Art Institute. The other is a smaller but much finer version cast in bronze, presently in the collection of the Krannert Art Museum on the campus of the University of Illinois at Urbana-Champaign.

During his lifetime Taft was friendly toward many Chicago-area artists and writers, including novelist Henry Blake Fuller, Poetry magazine founder and editor Harriet Monroe, and his own brother-in-law, novelist Hamlin Garland. Midwestern poet Jared Carter pays tribute to Taft's "The Solitude of the Soul" in his contemporary sonnet of the same name.
