= Lincoln the Lawyer =

- Lincoln (Statue)
- U.S. National Register of Historic Places
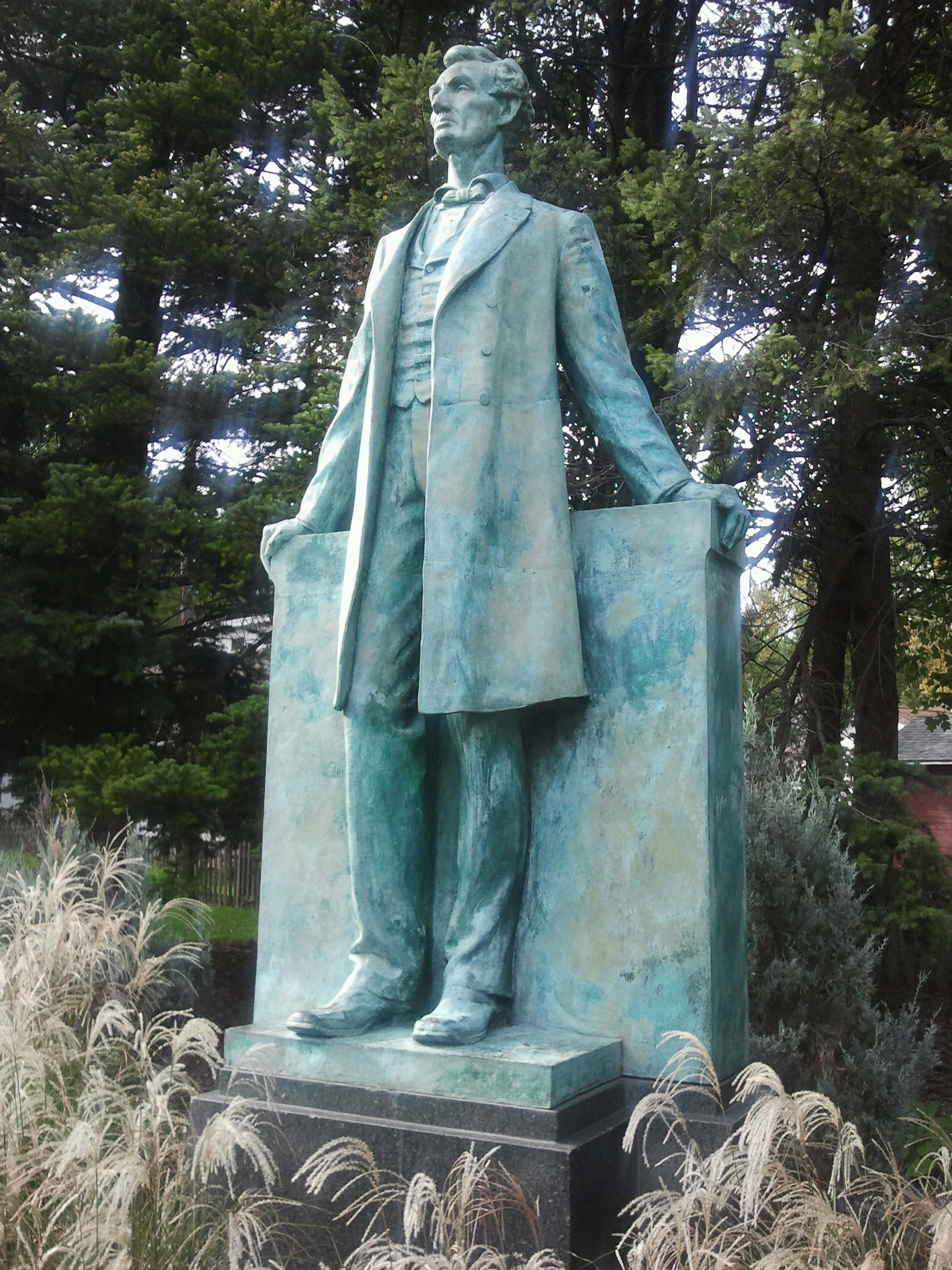
- September 2012

- Location within Illinois Location within the United States
- Location: 1000 Blk of S. Race St., Urbana, Illinois
- Coordinates: 40°6′14″N 88°12′35″W
- Area: less than one acre
- Built: 1927
- Architect: Taft, Lorado Zadok
- NRHP reference No.: 04000144
- Added to NRHP: March 10, 2004

Lincoln the Lawyer, also known as The Young Circuit Lawyer, Young Lincoln or simply Abraham Lincoln, is a Lorado Taft sculpture now located on the 1000 block of Race Street, Urbana, Illinois, across from Urbana High School in Carle Park. The statue was dedicated by Taft on July 3, 1927. It was moved to the eastern entrance of Carle Park on December 4, 1927, when it was first placed on a pedestal facing due east. Taft requested a slightly different placement, facing southeast, and the statue was moved about 20 feet north to the present site in December 1955. It was restored in 2003, and added to the National Register of Historic Places on March 10, 2004.

Lincoln had ridden as a circuit lawyer on the 8th Judicial Circuit through Urbana from 1837 to 1848. The statue was paid for by a bequest of Mrs. J.O. Cunningham who, with her husband, had been friends of Lincoln since his time as a circuit lawyer. The bequest of $10,000 was funded by the sale of her house on nearby Green Street. This amount was less than half of Taft's usual commission for work in bronze, but he may have accepted the commission because of his close ties to the community. He had been raised in nearby Champaign.

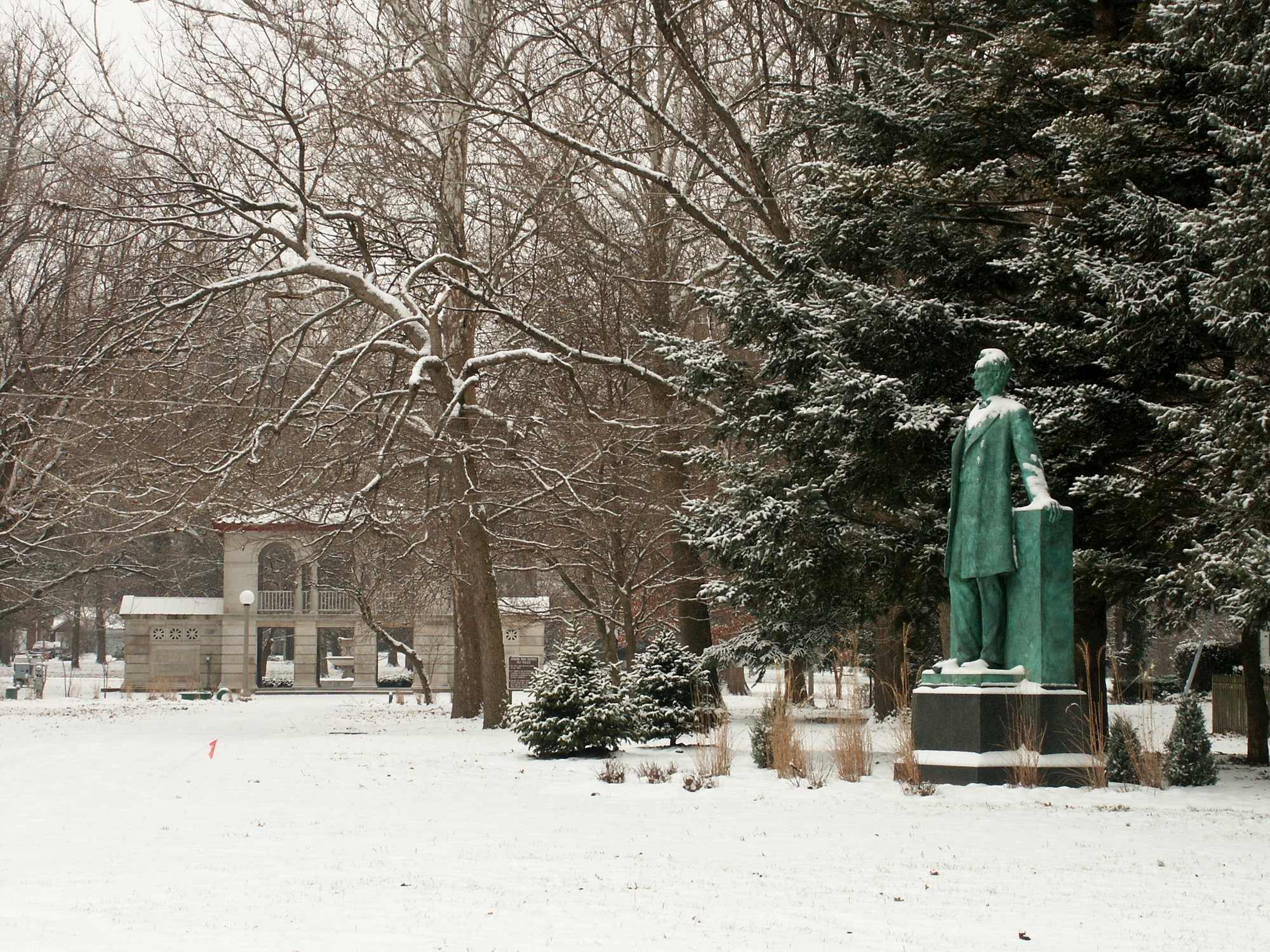
Carle Park, December 2004

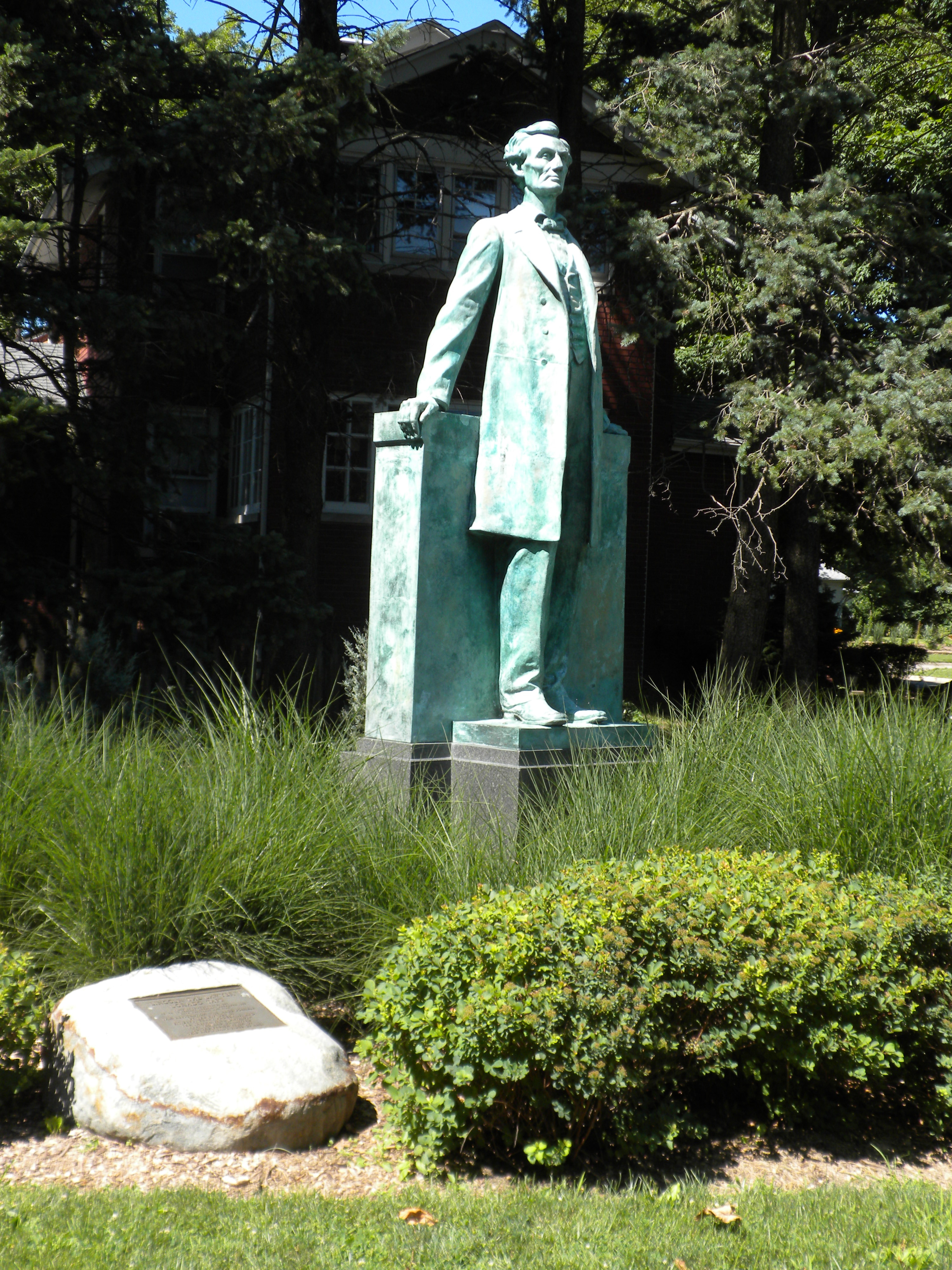
June 2010

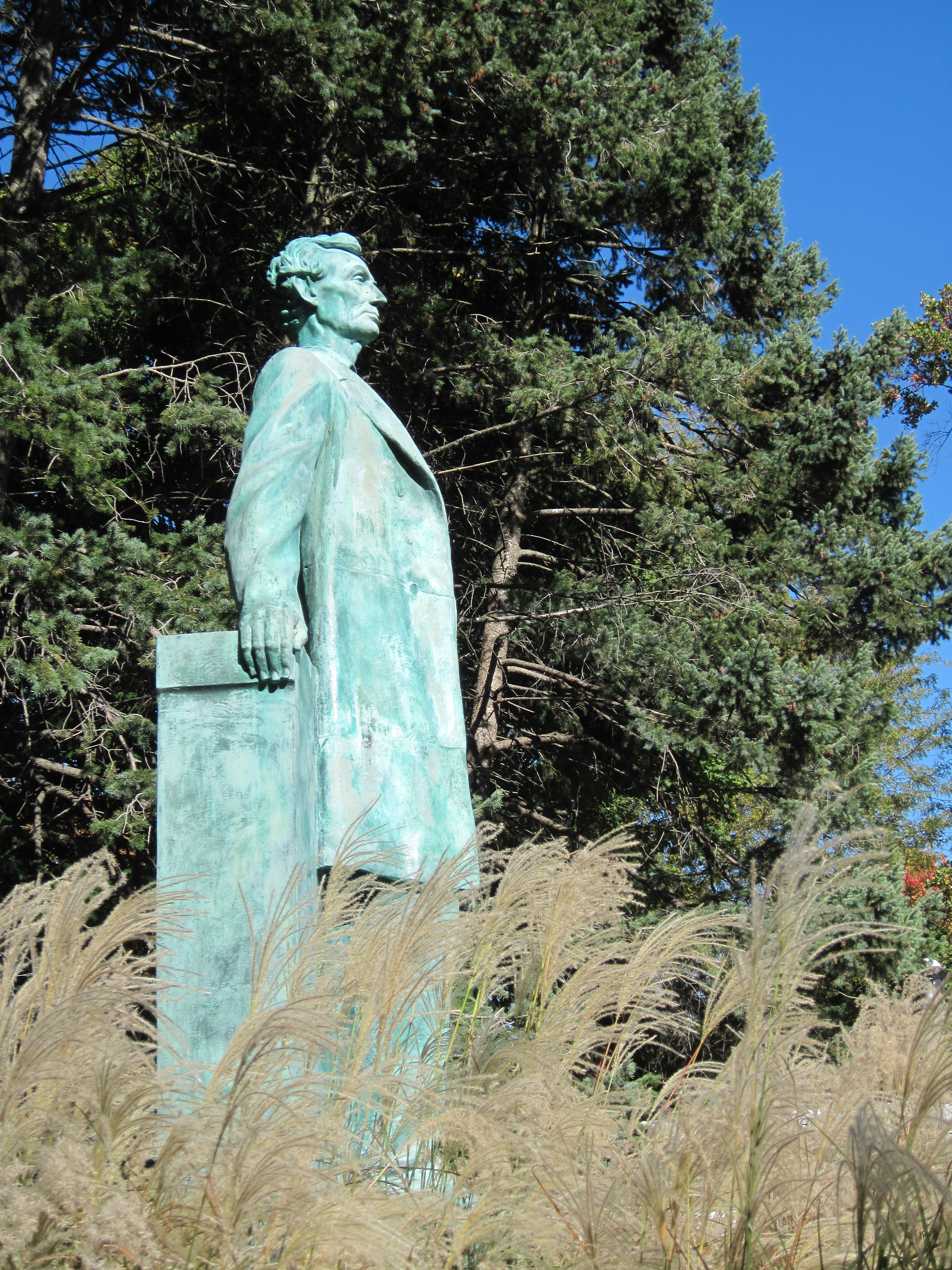

== See also ==
- List of statues of Abraham Lincoln
- List of sculptures of presidents of the United States
