= Lorado Taft =

American sculptor and writer (1860–1936)

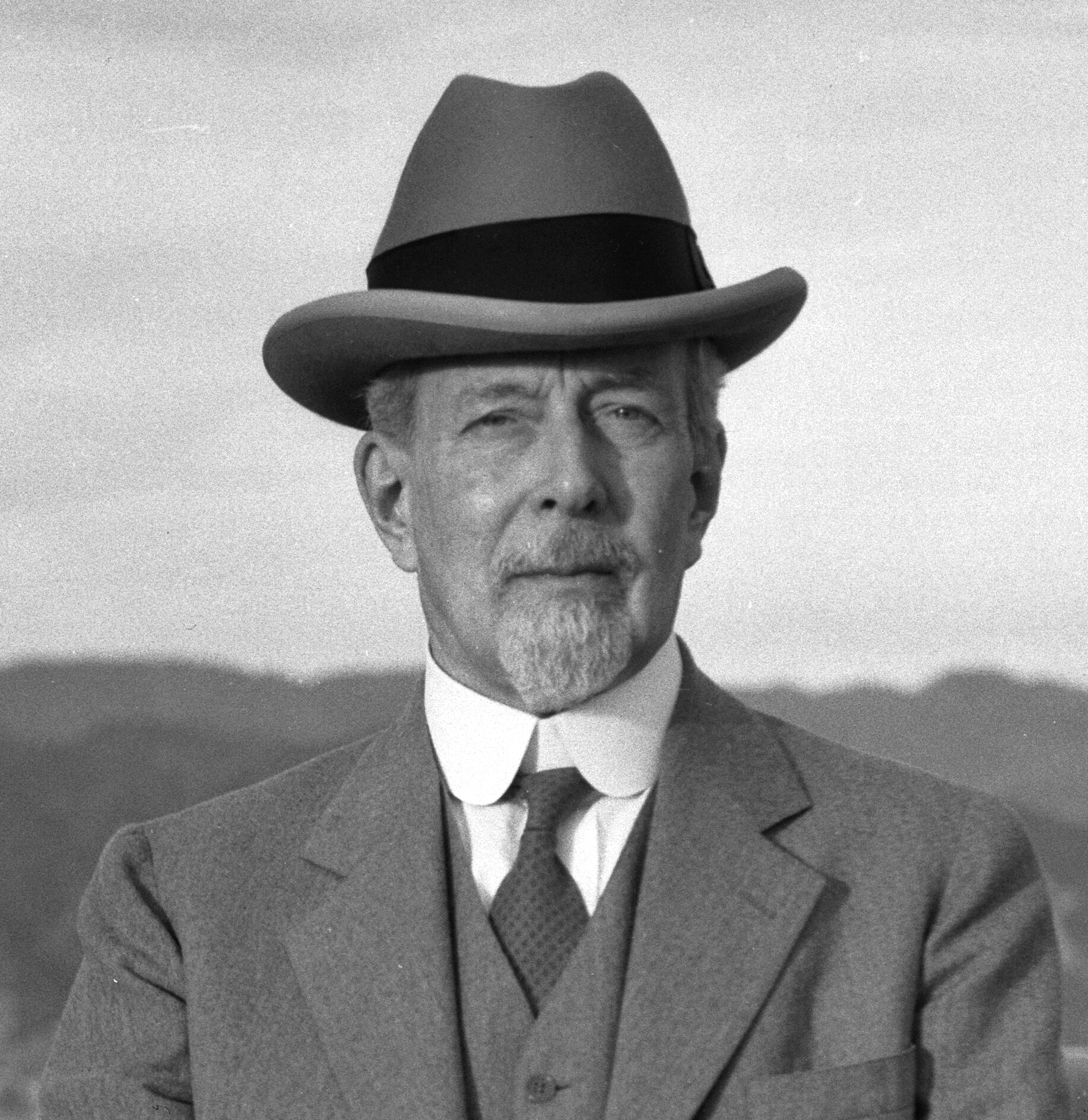
- Taft in 1934
- Born: Lorado Zadok Taft; April 29, 1860; Elmwood, Illinois, U.S.
- Died: October 30, 1936 (aged 76); Chicago, Illinois, U.S.
- Resting place: Elmwood, Illinois, U.S.
- Known for: Sculpture
- Relatives: Emily Taft Douglas (daughter); Paul Douglas (son-in-law)

Lorado Zadok Taft (April 29, 1860 – October 30, 1936) was an American sculptor, writer and educator. A proponent of the American Renaissance movement, his work was concentrated in his home state of Illinois and elsewhere in the American Midwest. His monumental pieces include Fountain of Time, Spirit of the Great Lakes, and The Eternal Indian. His 1903 book, The History of American Sculpture, was the first survey of the subject and stood for decades as the standard reference. With what were seen as progressive views on the subject, he has been credited with helping to advance the status of women as sculptors.

Taft was the father of U.S. Representative Emily Taft Douglas, father-in-law to her husband, U.S. Senator Paul Douglas, and a distant relative of U.S. President William Howard Taft.

== Early years and education ==
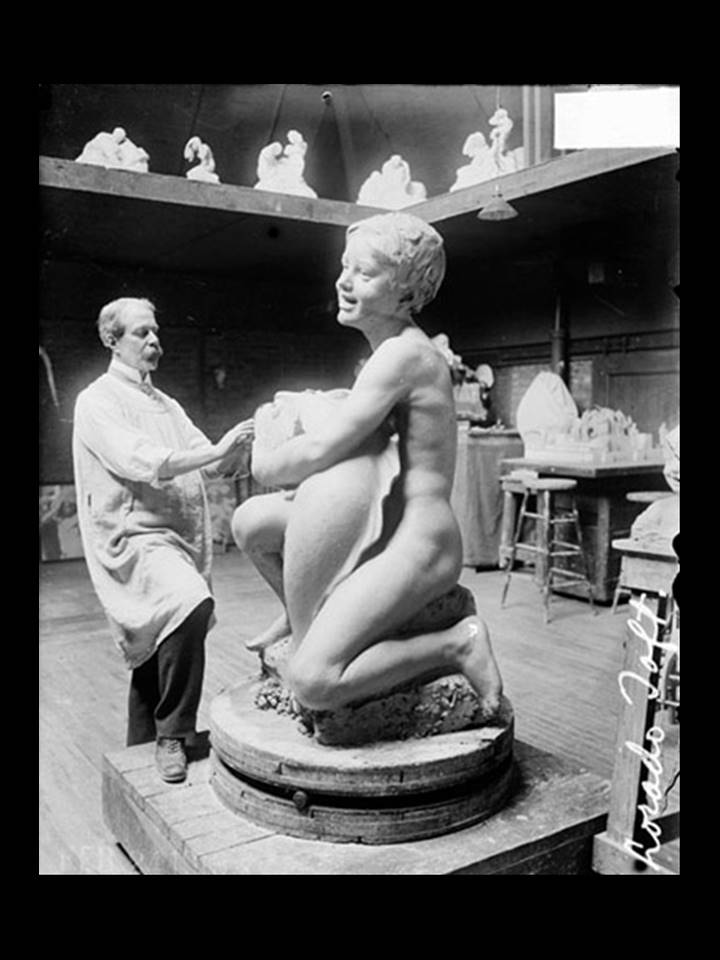
Taft at work on Fountain of the Great Lakes in Lorado Taft Midway Studios in 1913

Taft was born in Elmwood, Illinois. His parents were Don Carlos Taft and Mary Lucy Foster. His father was a professor of geology at the Illinois Industrial University (later renamed the University of Illinois at Urbana–Champaign). He lived much of his childhood at 601 E. John Street, Champaign, Illinois, near the center of the UIUC campus. The house, now known as the Taft House, was built by his father in 1873. It was purchased by the university in 1949 and moved about one mile southeast in 1981. After being homeschooled by his parents, Taft earned his bachelor's degree (1879) and master's degree (1880) at Illinois Industrial University.

After his master's degree, he left for Paris to study sculpture, attending the École nationale supérieure des Beaux-Arts from 1880 to 1883, where he studied with Augustin Dumont, Jean-Marie Bonnassieux, and Gabriel Thomas. His record there was outstanding; he was cited as "top man" in his studio and twice exhibited at the Salon.

== Career ==
=== Sculptor and educator ===
Upon returning to the United States in 1886, Taft settled in Chicago. He taught at The School of the Art Institute of Chicago until 1929. In addition to work in clay and plaster, Taft taught his students marble carving, and had them work on group projects. He also lectured at the University of Chicago and the University of Illinois.

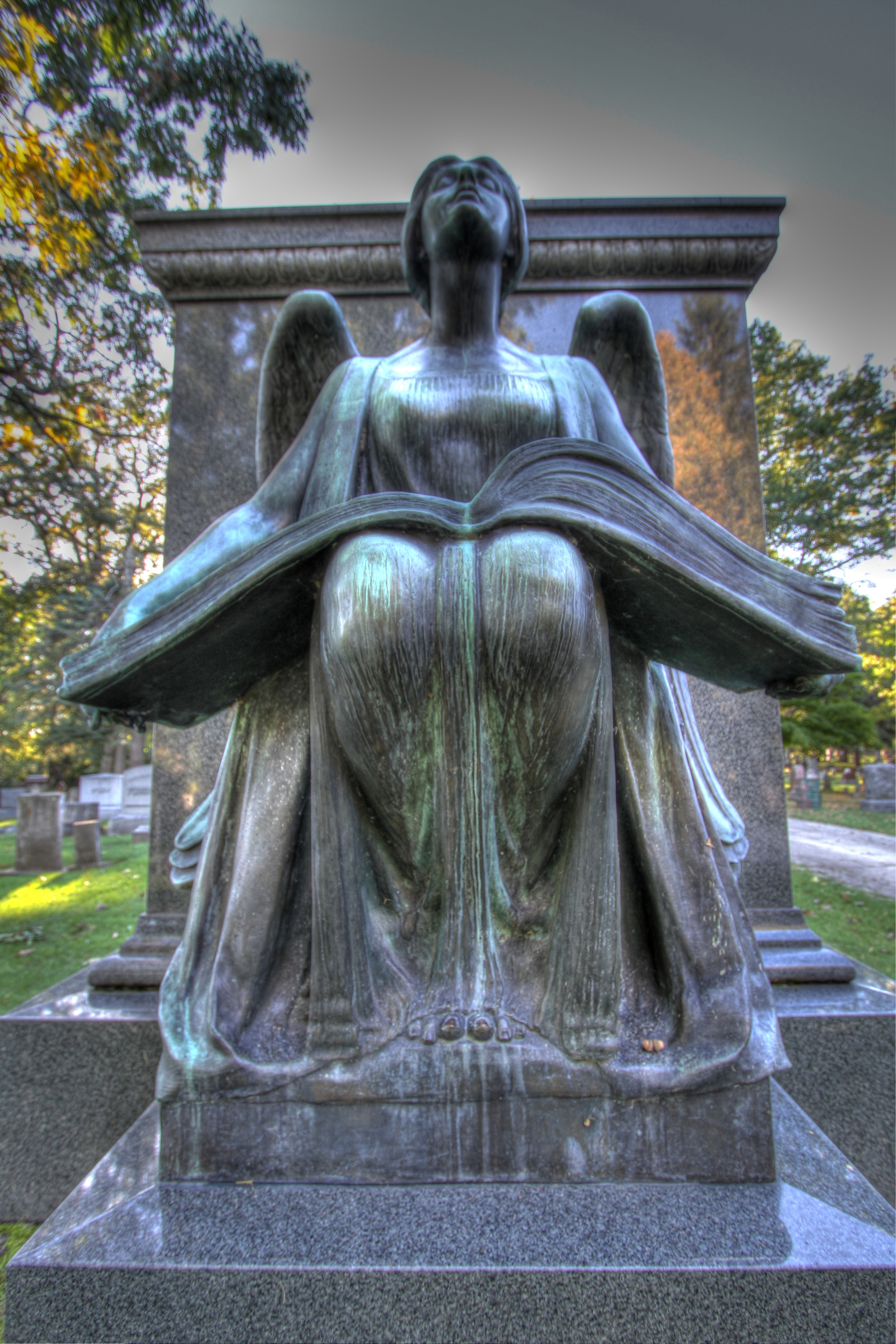
The Recording Angel, 1923

In 1892, while the art community of Chicago was preparing for the World's Columbian Exposition of 1893, chief architect Daniel Burnham expressed concern to Taft that the sculptural adornments to the buildings might not be finished on time. Taft asked if he could employ some of his female students as assistants (it was not socially accepted for women to work as sculptors at that time) for the Horticultural Building. Burnham responded, "Hire anyone, even white rabbits, if they'll do the work." From that arose a group of talented women sculptors known as "the White Rabbits", which included Enid Yandell, Carol Brooks MacNeil, Bessie Potter Vonnoh, Janet Scudder, Julia Bracken, and Ellen Rankin Copp.

Later, another former student, Frances Loring, noted that Taft used his students' talents to further his own career, a not-uncommon situation. In general, history has given Taft credit for helping to advance the status of women as sculptors.

At a meeting in St. Paul, Minnesota to decide which artist submission to select for a monument of Col. William Colvill to go in the Minnesota State Capitol rotunda, the state art commission asked the opinion of Taft who was in the city at the time. While he did not recommend any of the models, he thought the model by Catherine Backus had points in its favor. Originally the commission favored the model by John K. Daniels but it was voted down. They then selected Backus' model to execute in a nine foot full-size bronze.

=== Lectures and writings ===
As Taft grew older, his eloquence and compelling writing led him, along with Frederick Ruckstull, to the forefront of sculpture's conservative ranks, where he often served as a spokesperson against the modern and abstract trends that developed during his lifetime. Taft's frequent lecture tours for the Chautauqua gave him a broad, popular celebrity status.

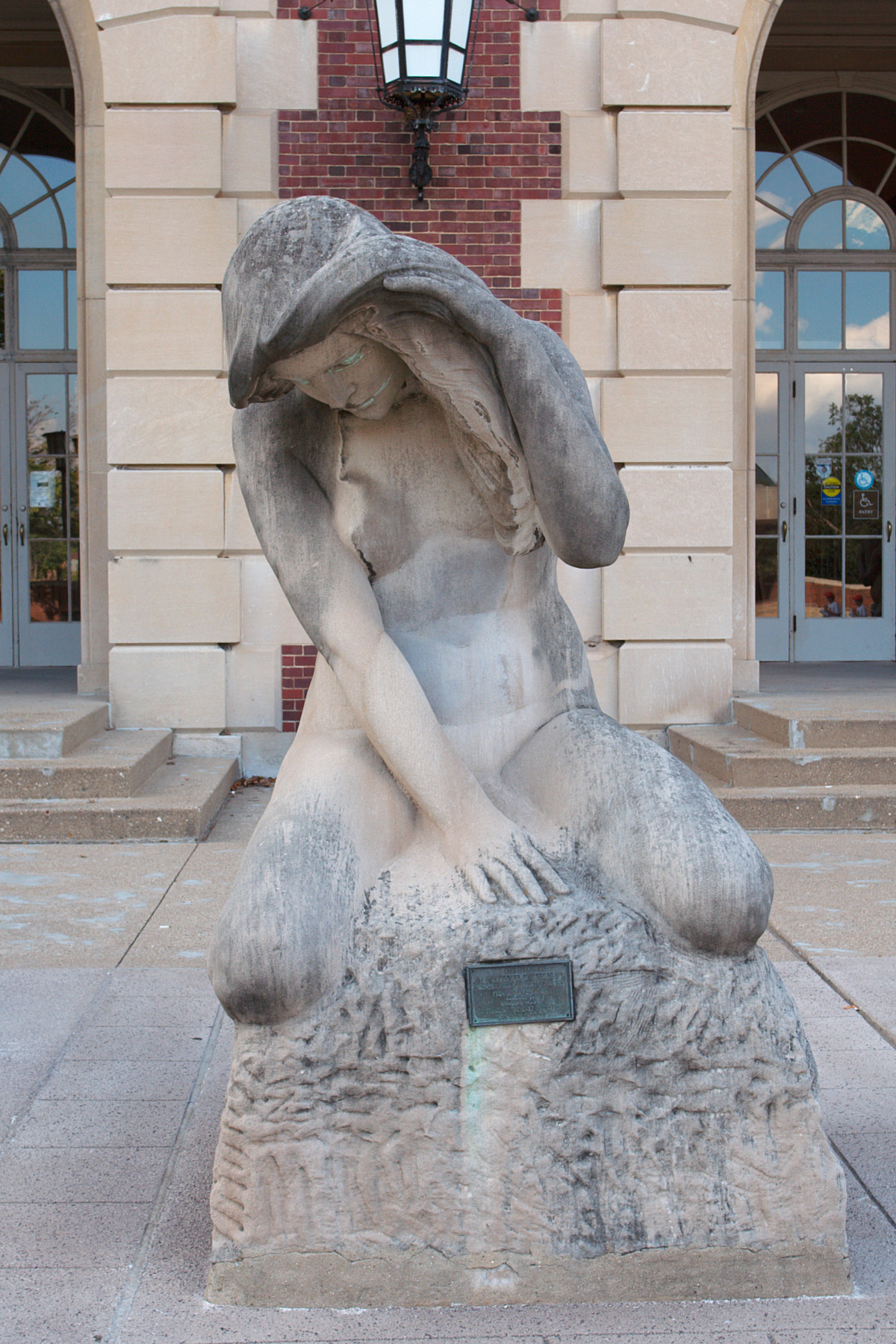
Part of the Fountain of Creation (1933, unfinished), at the Library of the University of Illinois at Urbana-Champaign

In some settings, Taft is better known for his writings than for his sculpture. In 1903, Taft published The History of American Sculpture, the first survey of the subject. The revised 1925 version was to remain the standard reference on the subject until the art historian E. Wayne Craven published Sculpture in America in 1968. In 1921, Taft published Modern Tendencies in Sculpture, a compilation of his lectures given at the Art Institute of Chicago. At the time, it offered a distinct perspective on the development of European sculpture; today, the book continues to be regarded as an excellent survey of American sculpture in the early years of the 20th century.

=== Associations ===
In 1898, Taft was a founding member of the Eagle's Nest Art Colony, which is currently a field and research campus for Northern Illinois University in Oregon, Illinois. Taft designed the Columbus Fountain at Washington Union Station in Washington, D.C., in collaboration with Daniel Burnham. Taft was a member of the National Academy of Design, the National Institute of Arts and Letters, and the American Academy of Arts and Letters; he headed the National Sculpture Society in the 1920s, exhibiting at both their 1923 and 1929 shows, and he served on the Board of Art Advisors of Illinois. He served on the U.S. Commission of Fine Arts from 1925 to 1929, and was an honorary member of the American Institute of Architects. His papers reside in collections at the Smithsonian Archives of American Art, the University of Illinois, and the Art Institute of Chicago.

He maintained his connections with his alma mater throughout his life. (His association with the University is commemorated by a street named in his honor.) In 1929, he dedicated his sculpture Alma Mater on the University of Illinois campus. Taft envisioned his Alma Mater as a benign and magnificent woman, about 14 ft (4.3 m) high and dressed in classical draperies, rising from a throne and advancing a step forward with outstretched arms in a gesture of generous greeting to her children. Two figures behind her on either side represent the university's motto, Learning and Labor.

=== Final years ===
He received numerous awards, prizes, and honorary degrees.

Taft was active until the end of his life. The week before he died, he attended the Quincy, Illinois, dedication ceremonies for his sculpture celebrating the Lincoln–Douglas debates. He died in his home studio in Chicago on October 30, 1936. He was cremated, and his ashes were scattered at Elmwood Cemetery near Bloomington, Illinois.

== Sculptor's body of work ==
Taft may be best remembered for his various fountains.

The University of Illinois Archives has a series of photographs of most of Taft's important works, including many of their construction and preliminary models.

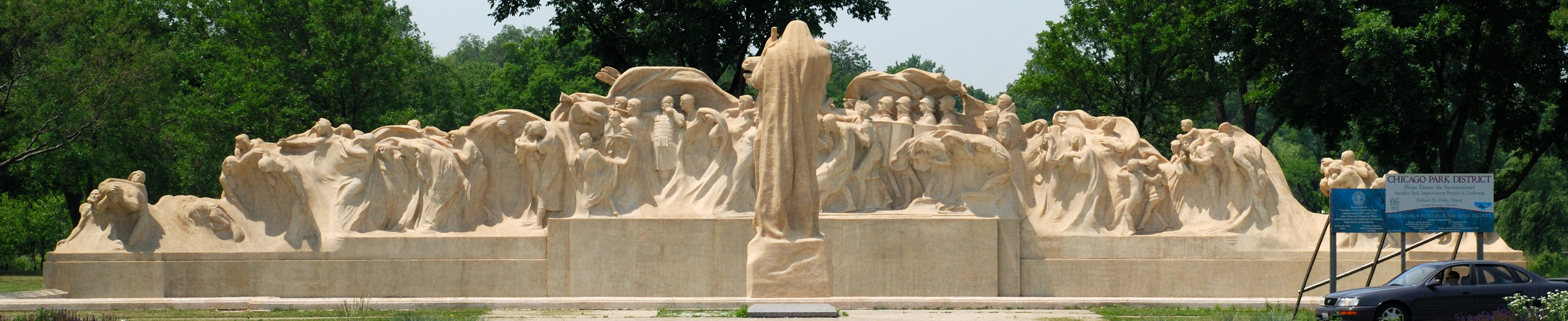
Fountain of Time (1910–1922), Midway Plaisance, Chicago, Illinois

Following more than a dozen years of work, Taft's Fountain of Time was unveiled at the west end of Chicago's Midway Plaisance in 1922. Based on poet Austin Dobson's lines—"Time goes, you say? Ah no, Alas, time stays, we go." The fountain shows a cloaked figure of time observing the stream of humanity flowing past.

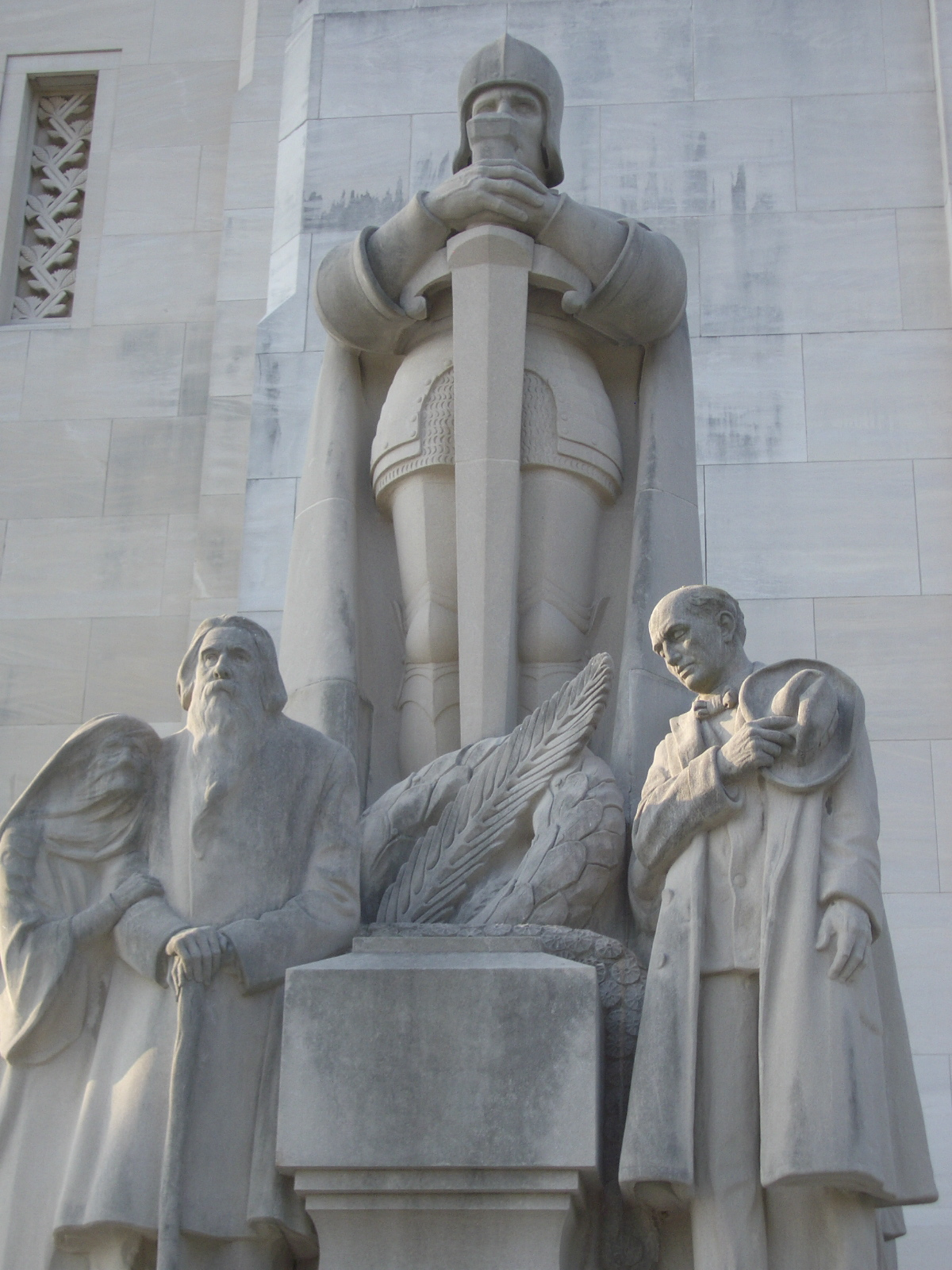
The Patriots (1932), Louisiana State Capitol, Baton Rouge

The last major commission that Taft completed was two groups for the front entrance to the Louisiana State Capitol Building, dedicated in 1932.

He left unfinished a vast work to be called the Fountain of Creation which he planned to place at the opposite end of the Chicago Midway to the Fountain of Time. Parts of this work were donated to the University of Illinois at Urbana–Champaign and are now at the library and Foellinger Auditorium. The University named a dormitory and a street in Taft's honor.

In 1965, his Chicago workplace at 6016 S. Ingleside Avenue (he moved there in 1906, when the building consisted merely of a brick barn) was designated a National Historic Landmark as Lorado Taft Midway Studios.

=== Selected commissions ===
- The Pioneers, Elmwood, Illinois, 1928

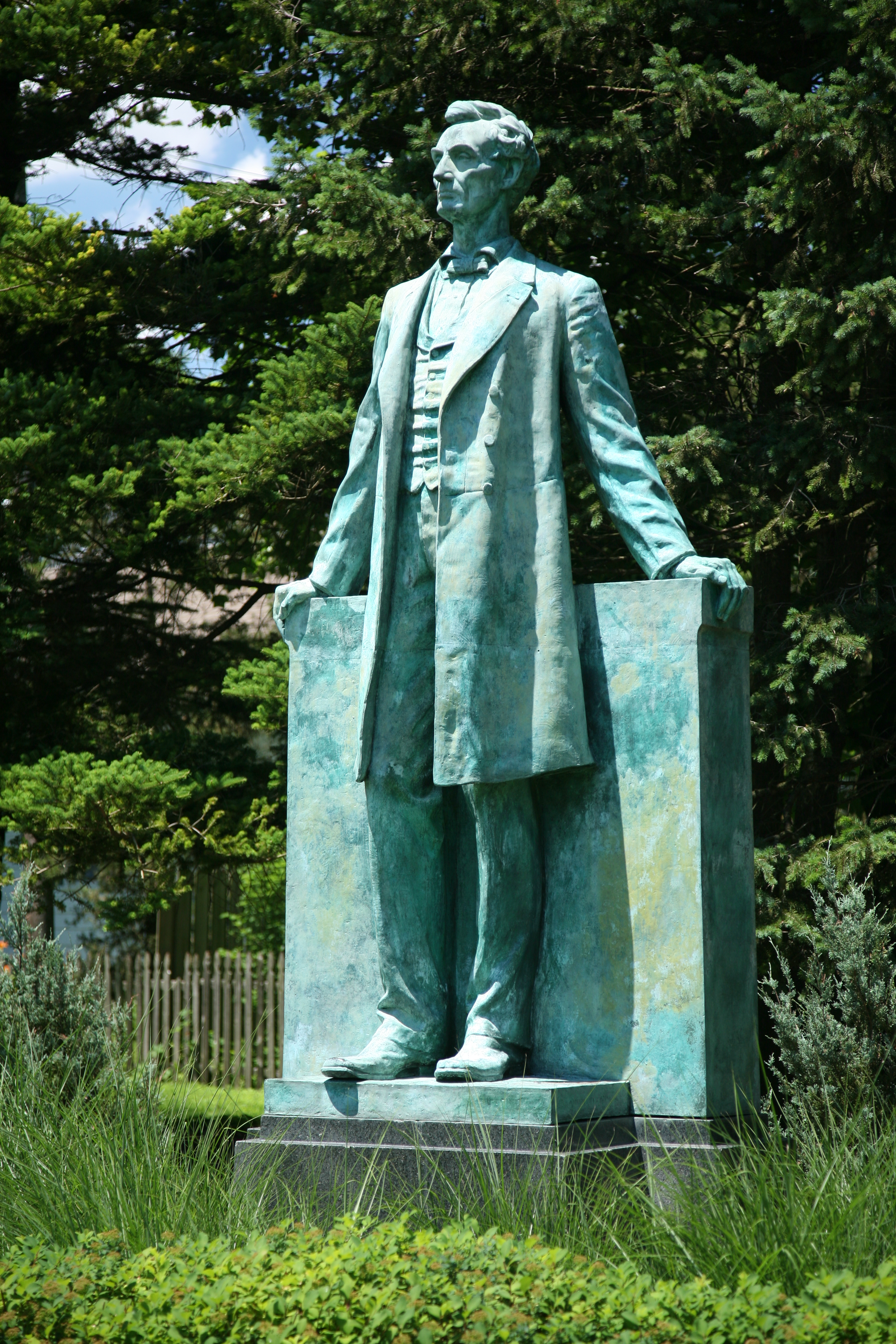
Lincoln the Lawyer (1929), Urbana, Illinois

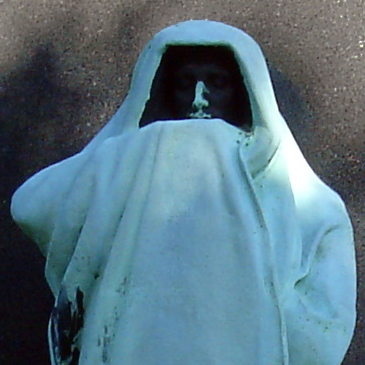
Eternal Silence (1909), Graceland Cemetery, Chicago, Illinois

- LaFayette Fountain, Lafayette, Indiana, 1887
- Schuyler Colfax, University Park, Indianapolis, Indiana, 1887
- Statue of George Washington, University of Washington, Seattle, Washington, 1905–1909. Created for the 1909 Alaska–Yukon–Pacific Exposition.
- Eternal Silence, Graves Memorial, Graceland Cemetery, Chicago, Illinois, 1909
- Chief Paduke Statue, Jefferson Street, Paducah, Kentucky, 1909
- Black Hawk Statue Monument, aka Eternal Indian, Oregon, Illinois, 1911
- The Solitude of the Soul, Art Institute of Chicago, Chicago, Illinois, 1911–1914
- Columbus Fountain, in front of Washington Union Station, Washington, D.C., 1912
- Fountain of the Great Lakes, Art Institute of Chicago, Chicago, Illinois, 1913
- Seated Woman With Children aka Music, Chicago, Illinois, 1915
- Thatcher Memorial Fountain, Denver, Colorado, 1918
- Two Boys with Dolphins Fountain, Oregon, Illinois, ca. 1920
- Fountain of Time, Chicago, Illinois, 1922
- William A. Foote Memorial, Woodland Cemetery, Jackson, Michigan, 1923
- Lincoln the Lawyer, Urbana, Illinois, 1927
- Annie Louise Keller Memorial, White Hall, Illinois, 1929
- Alma Mater, University of Illinois, 1929
- Frances Elizabeth Willard (plaque), Indiana Statehouse, Indianapolis, Indiana, 1929
- The Crusader, Lawson Monument, Graceland Cemetery, Chicago, Illinois, 1931
- Two Groups: The Pioneers and The Patriots, Louisiana State Capitol, Baton Rouge, Louisiana, 1932
- Ontario Sends Greetings to the Sea, eleventh issue of the Society of Medalists, 1935
- Bas-relief of Lincoln – Douglas Debate, Quincy, October 13, 1858, Quincy, Illinois, 1936
- Heald Square Monument (Robert Morris – George Washington – Haym Salomon), Chicago, Illinois, 1936–1941. Completed by Leonard Crunelle, Nellie Walker and Fred Torrey following Taft's 1936 death.
- Trotter Fountain, Bloomington, Illinois, 1911

=== War memorials ===
- 4th Michigan Infantry Monument, Gettysburg Battlefield, Gettysburg, Pennsylvania, 1889
- General Ulysses S. Grant Monument, Fort Leavenworth, Kansas, 1889
- Student Veteran Memorial, Hillsdale College, Hillsdale, Michigan, 1895
- Defense of the Flag, Withington Park, Jackson, Michigan, 1904
- The Soldiers' Monument, Oregon, Illinois, 1916
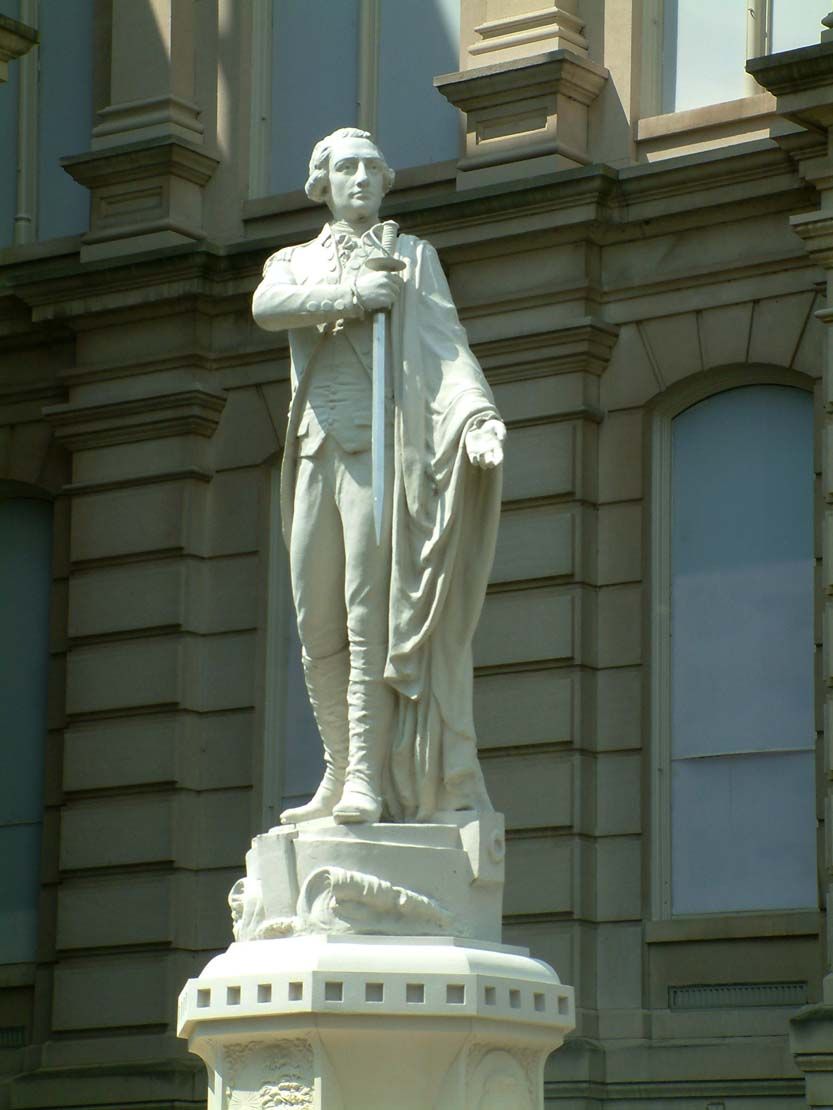
LaFayette Fountain (1887), Tippecanoe County Courthouse, Lafayette, Indiana

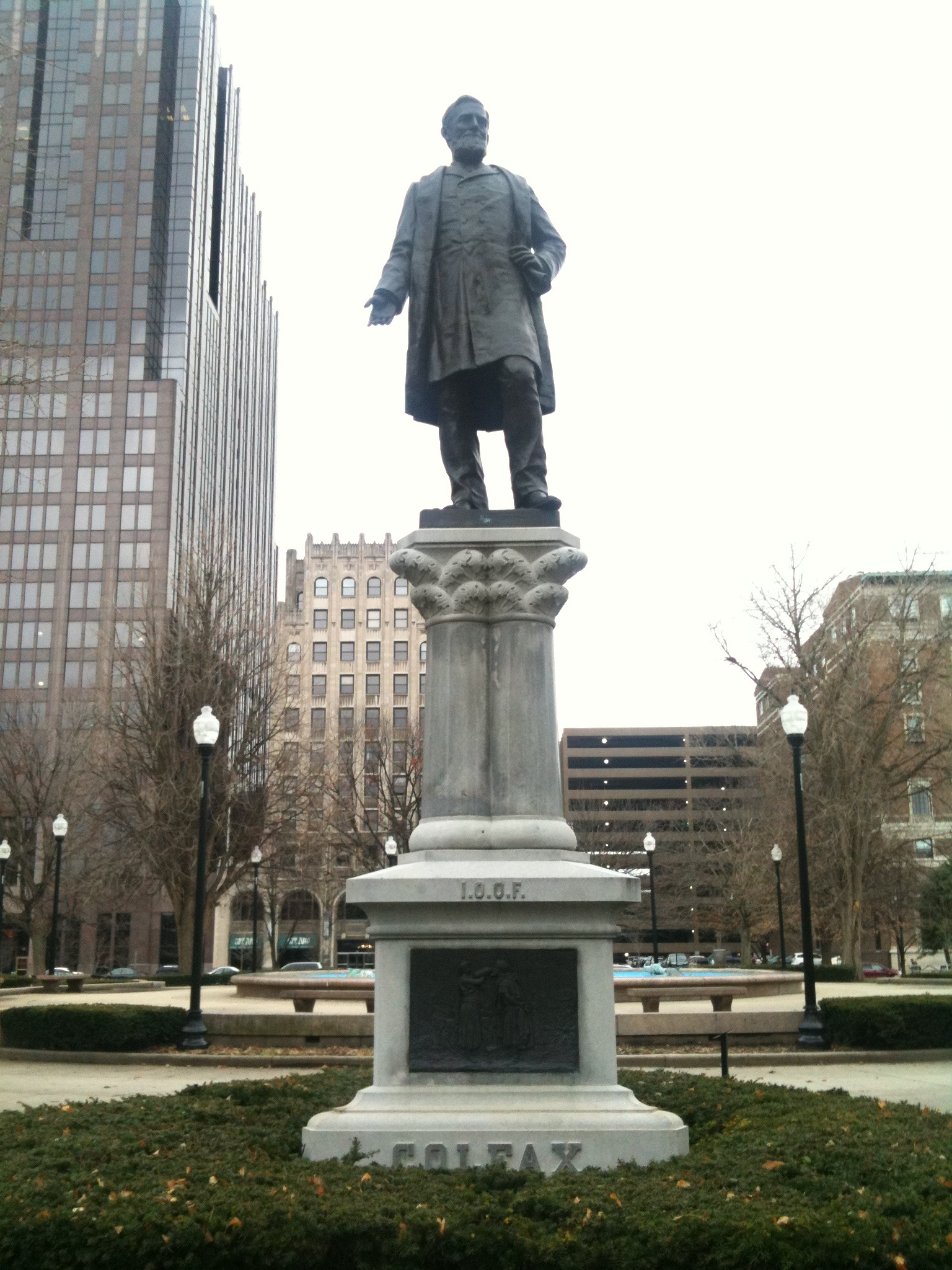
Schuyler Colfax (1887), University Park, Indianapolis, Indiana

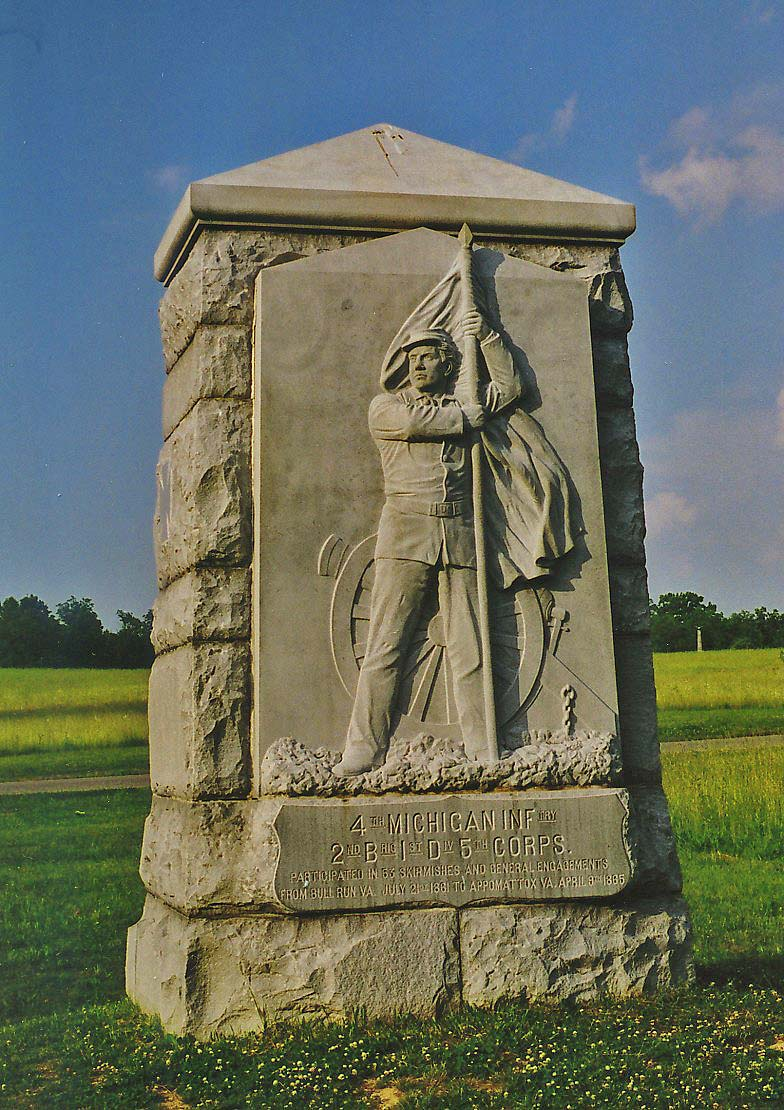
4th Michigan Infantry Monument (1889), Gettysburg Battlefield, Gettysburg, Pennsylvania

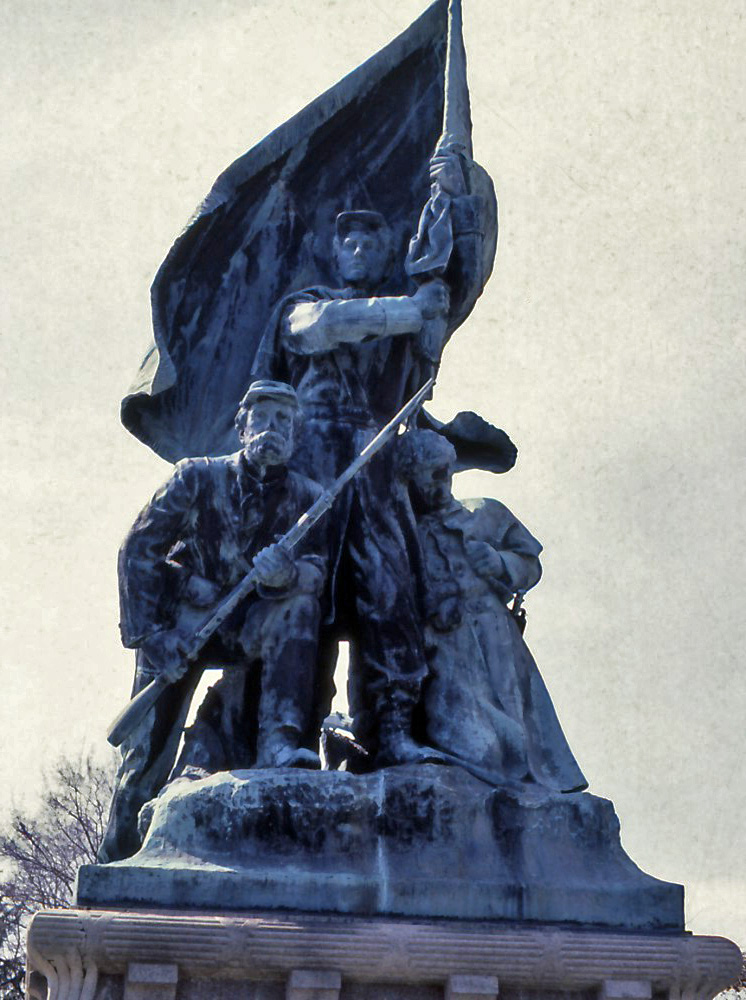
Defense of the Flag (1904), Jackson, Michigan

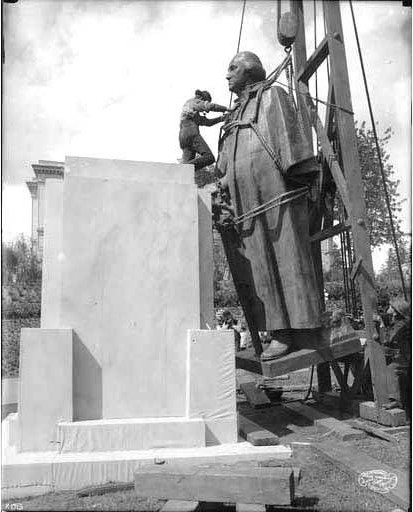
Statue of George Washington (1905–1909), University of Washington, Seattle

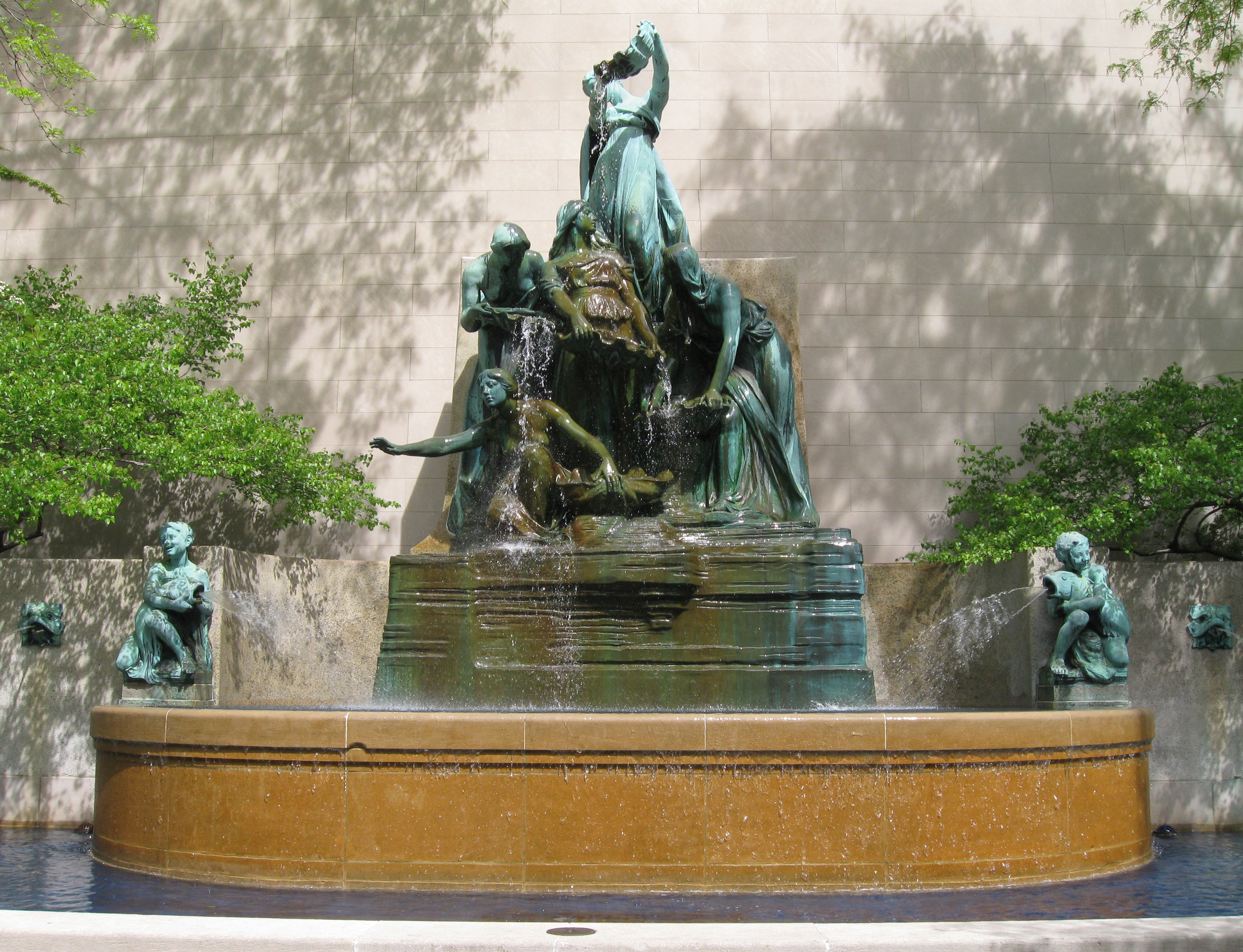
Fountain of the Great Lakes (1907–1913), Art Institute of Chicago

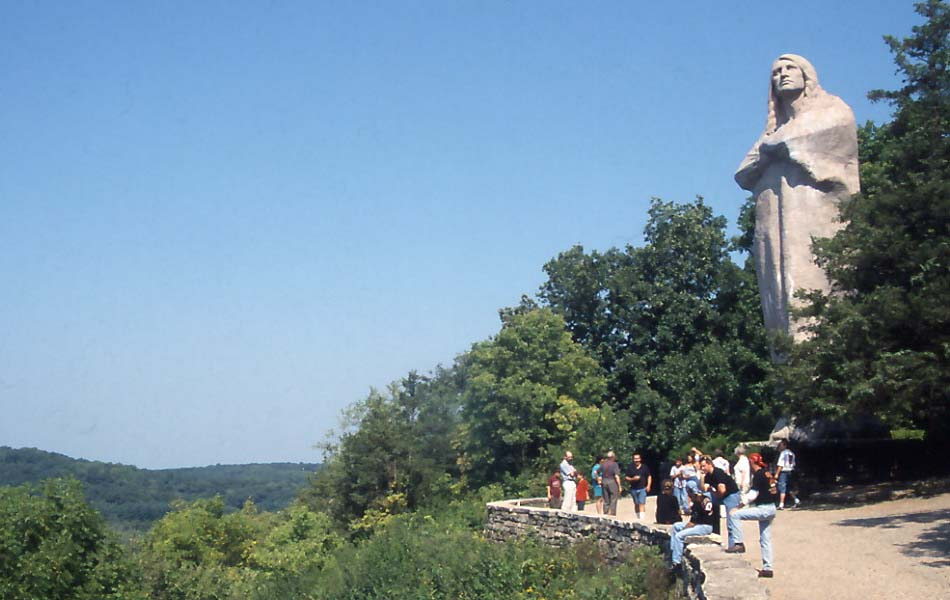
Black Hawk Statue (1908–1911), Lowden State Park, Oregon, Illinois

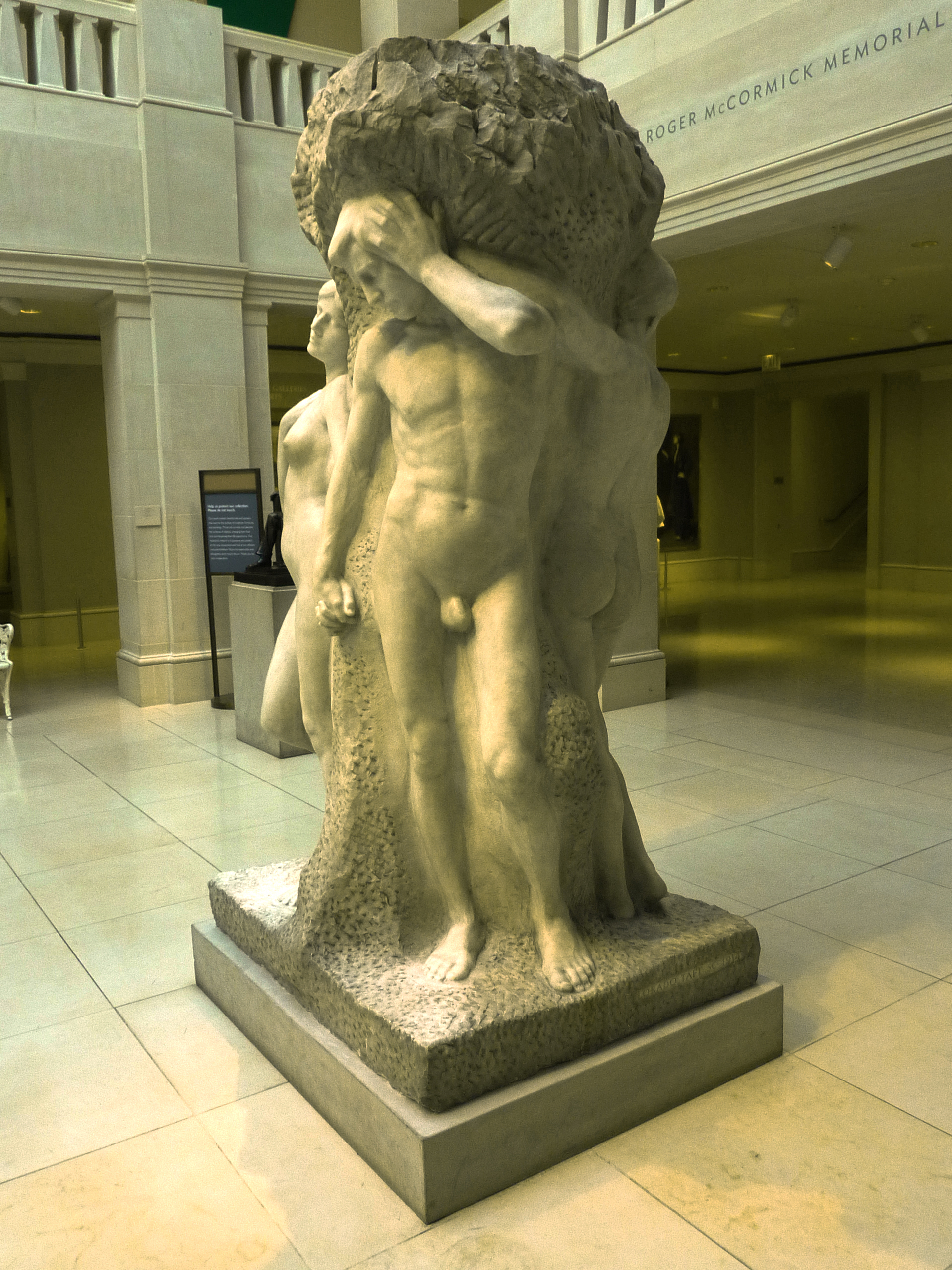
The Solitude of the Soul (1911–1914), Art Institute of Chicago

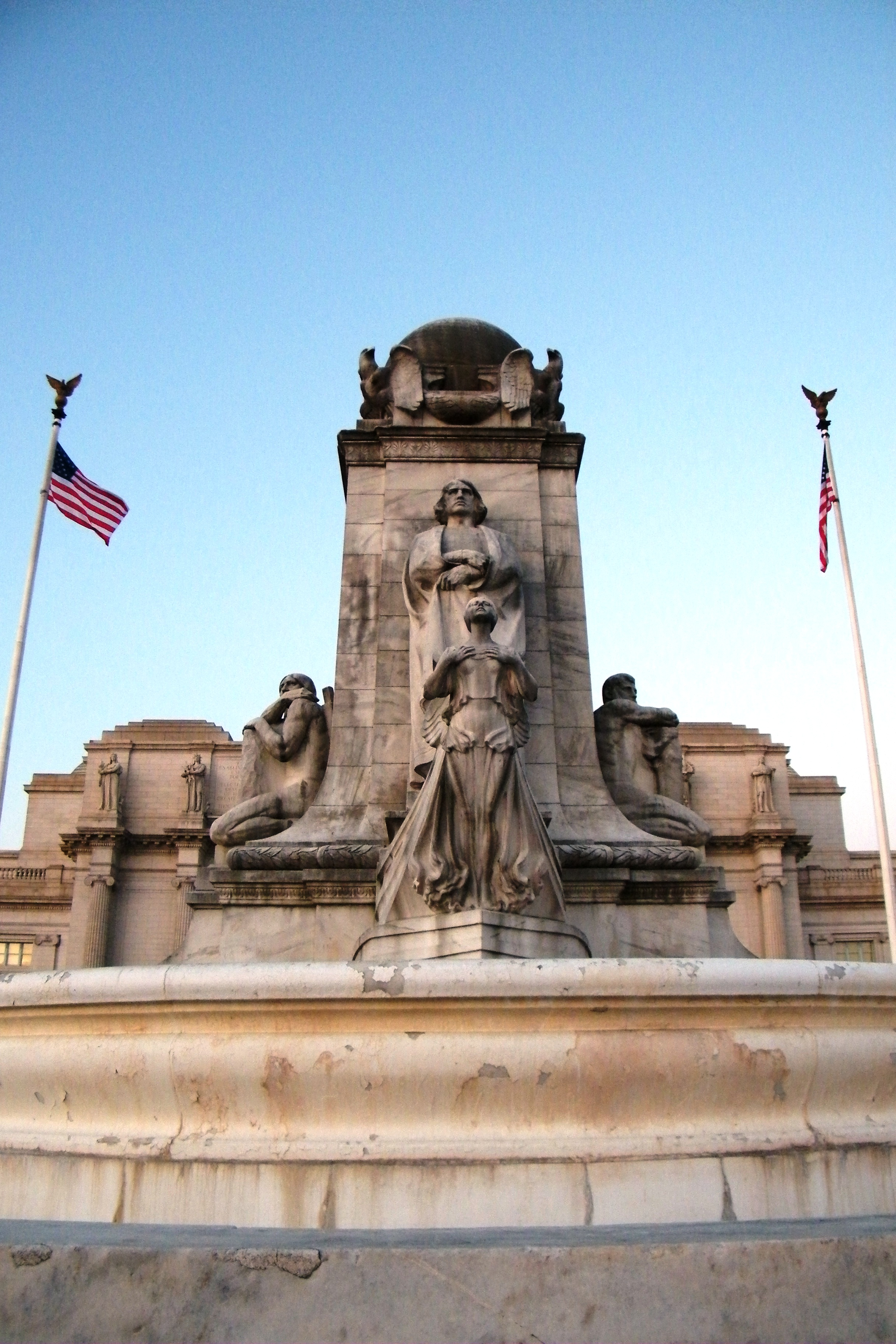
Columbus Fountain (1912), Washington Union Station, Washington, D.C.

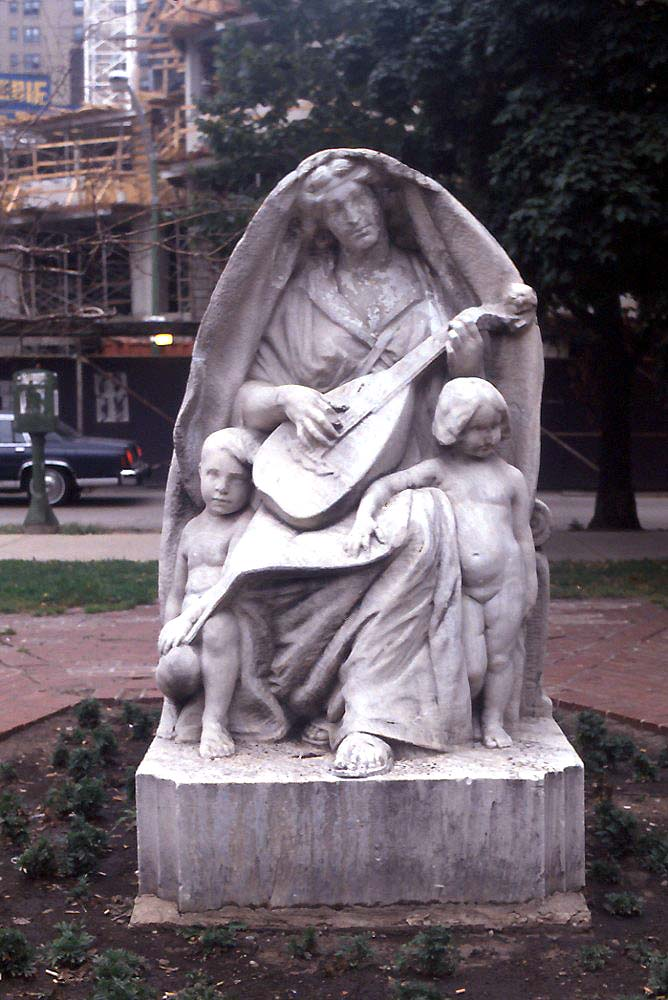
Seated Woman With Children, (1915), Chicago, Illinois

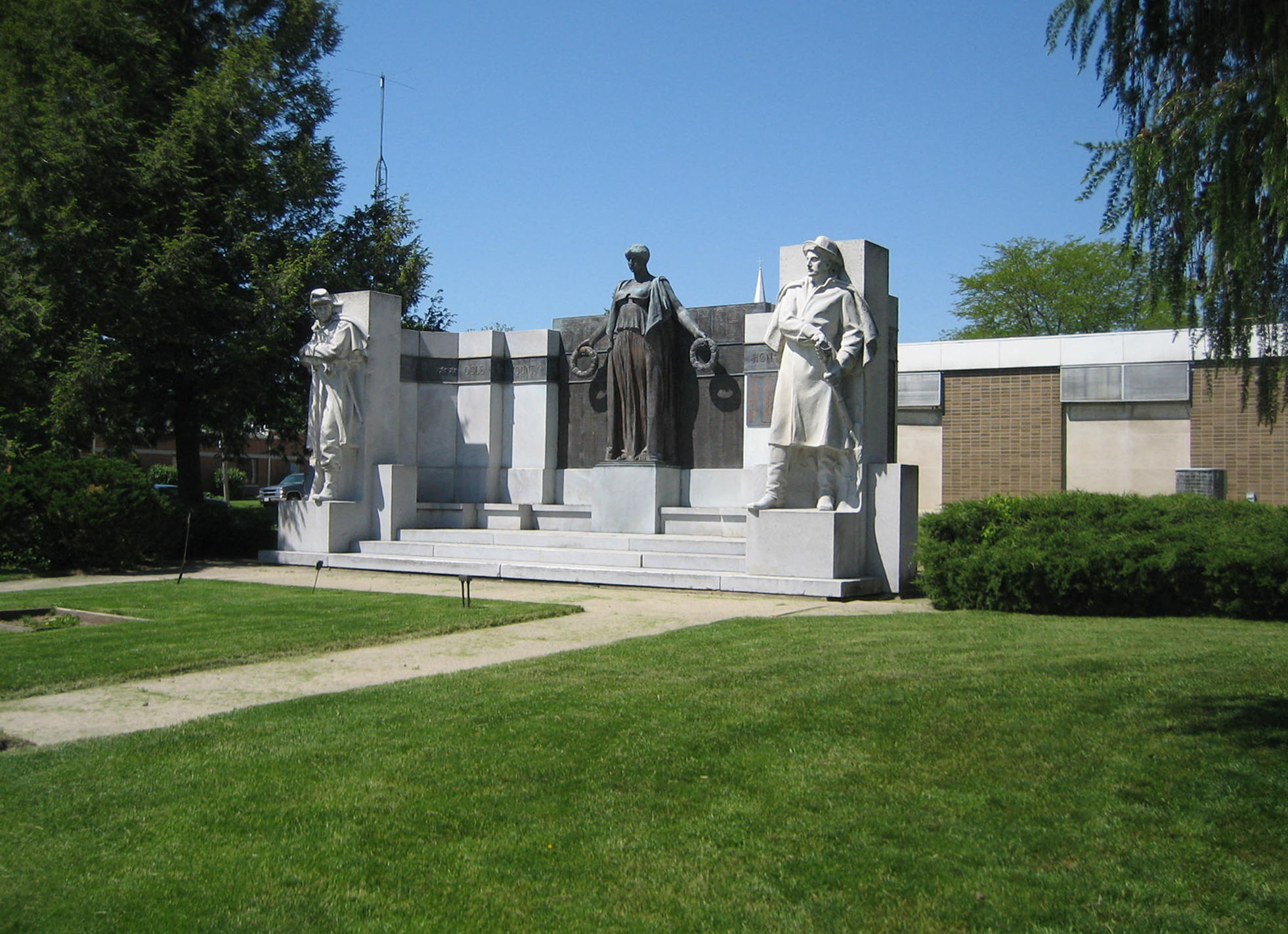
The Soldiers' Monument (1916), Oregon, Illinois

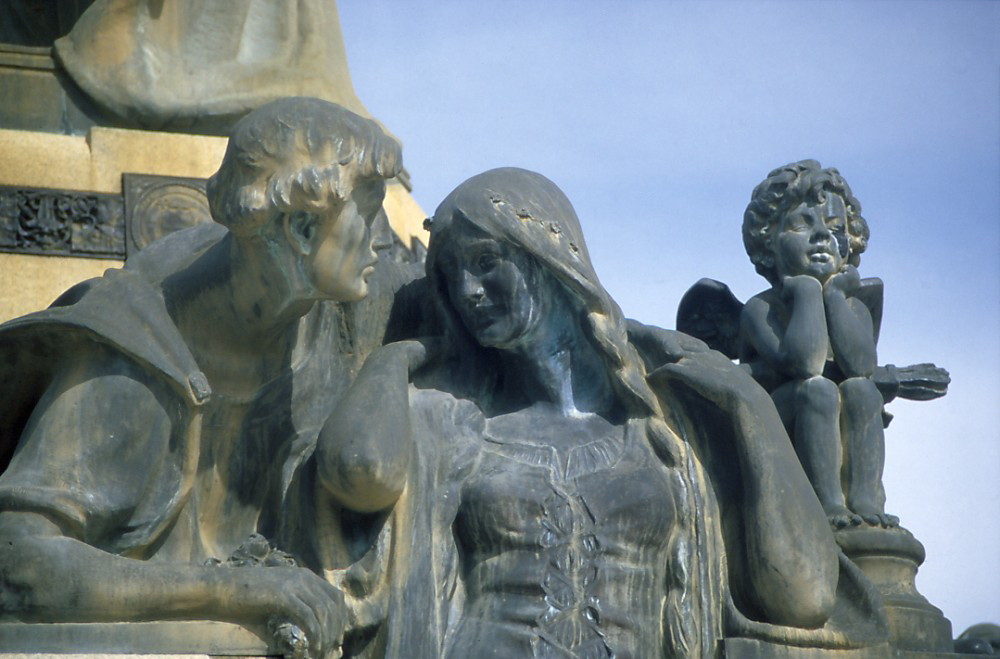
Thatcher Memorial Fountain (1918), Denver, Colorado

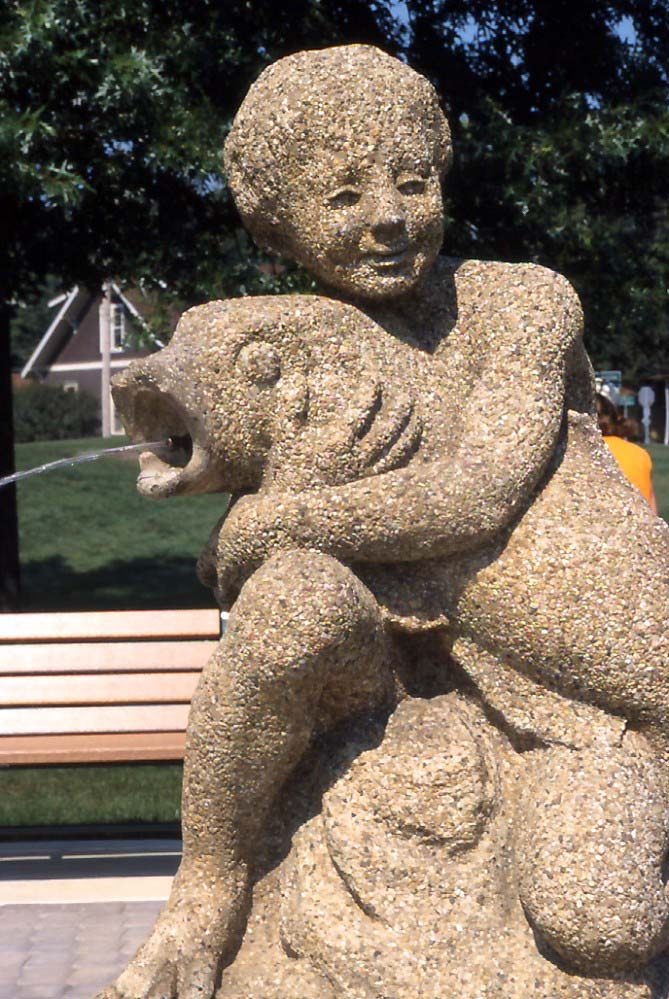
Two Boys with Dolphins (ca. 1920), Oregon, Illinois

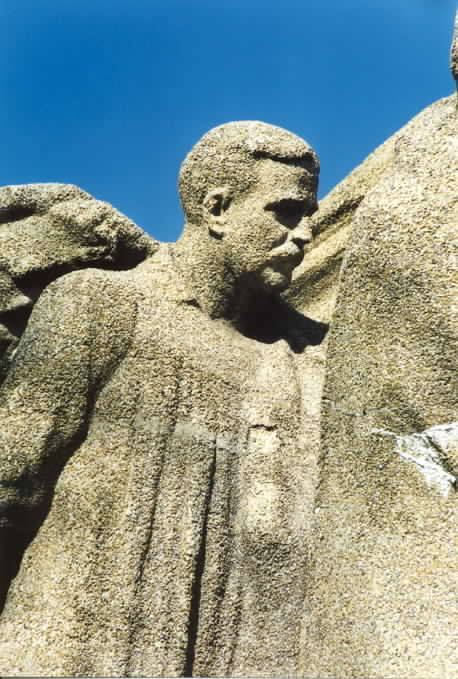
Taft's self-portrait on the Fountain of Time (1922), Chicago, Illinois

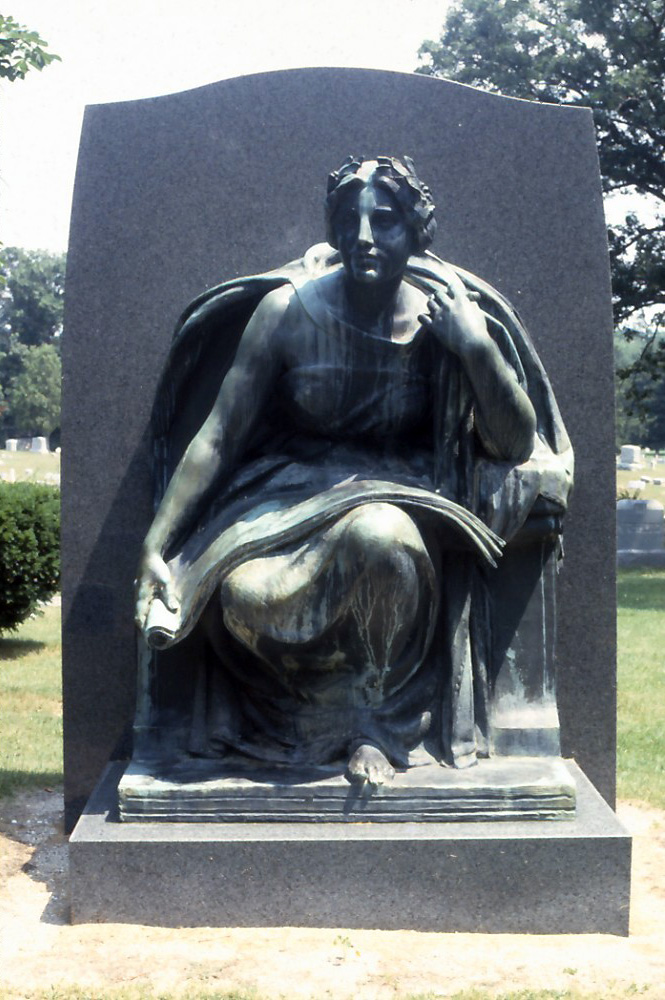
Foote Memorial (1923), Jackson, Michigan

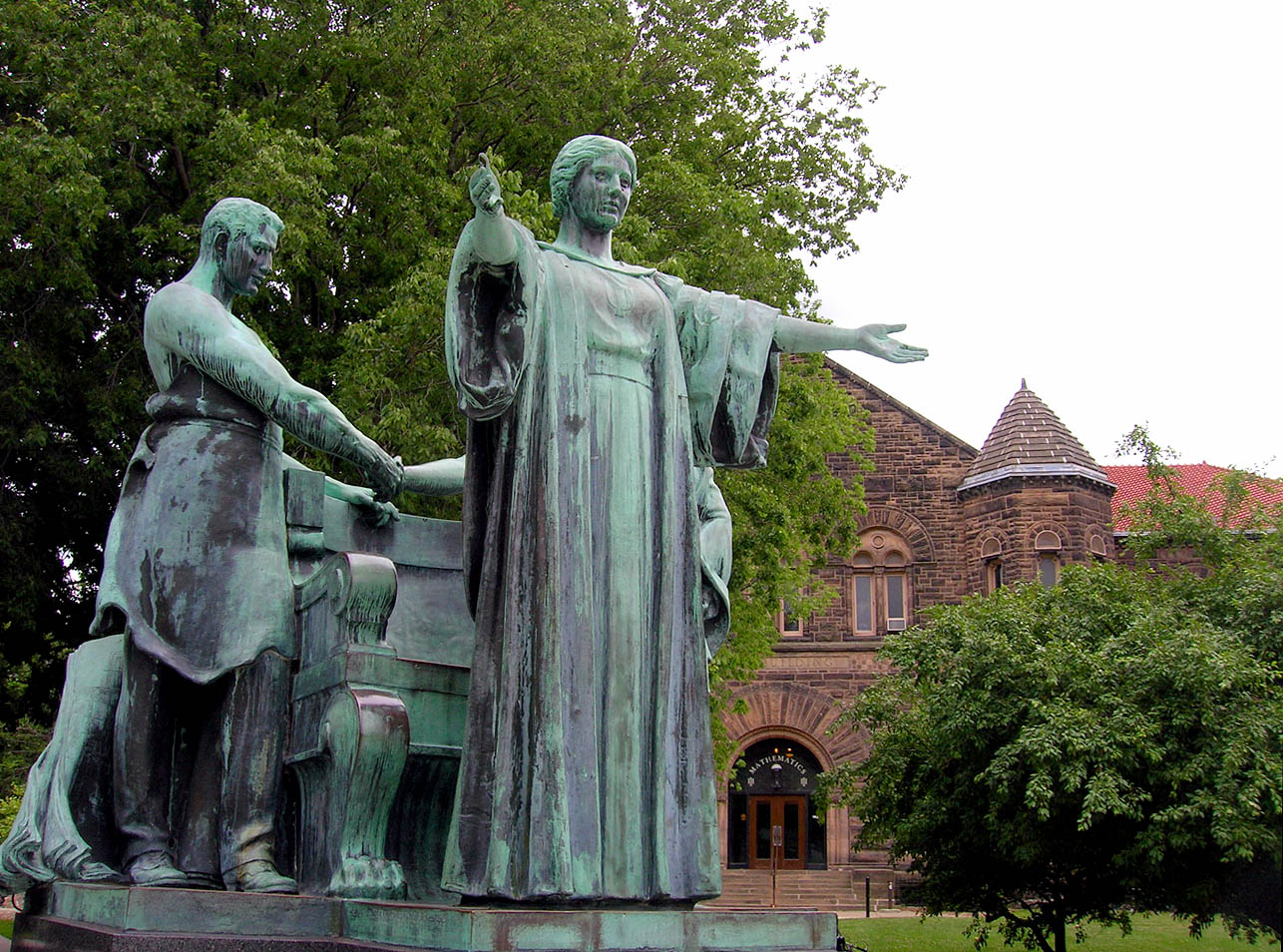
Alma Mater (1929), University of Illinois at Urbana-Champaign

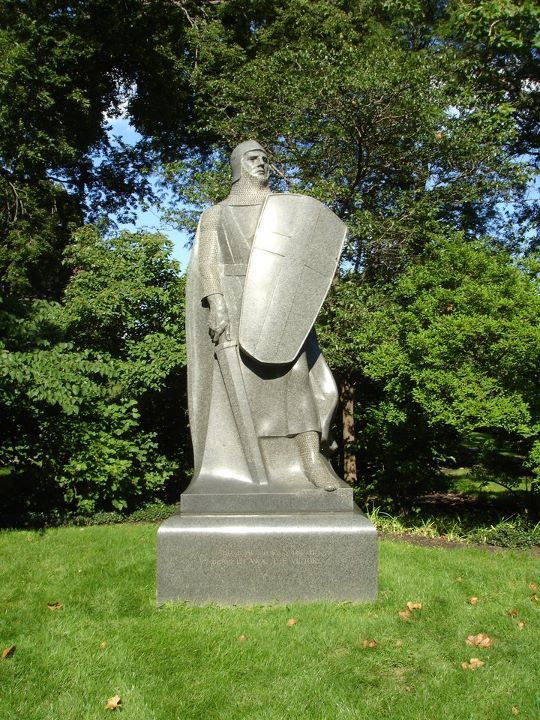
The Crusader (1931), Graceland Cemetery, Chicago, Illinois

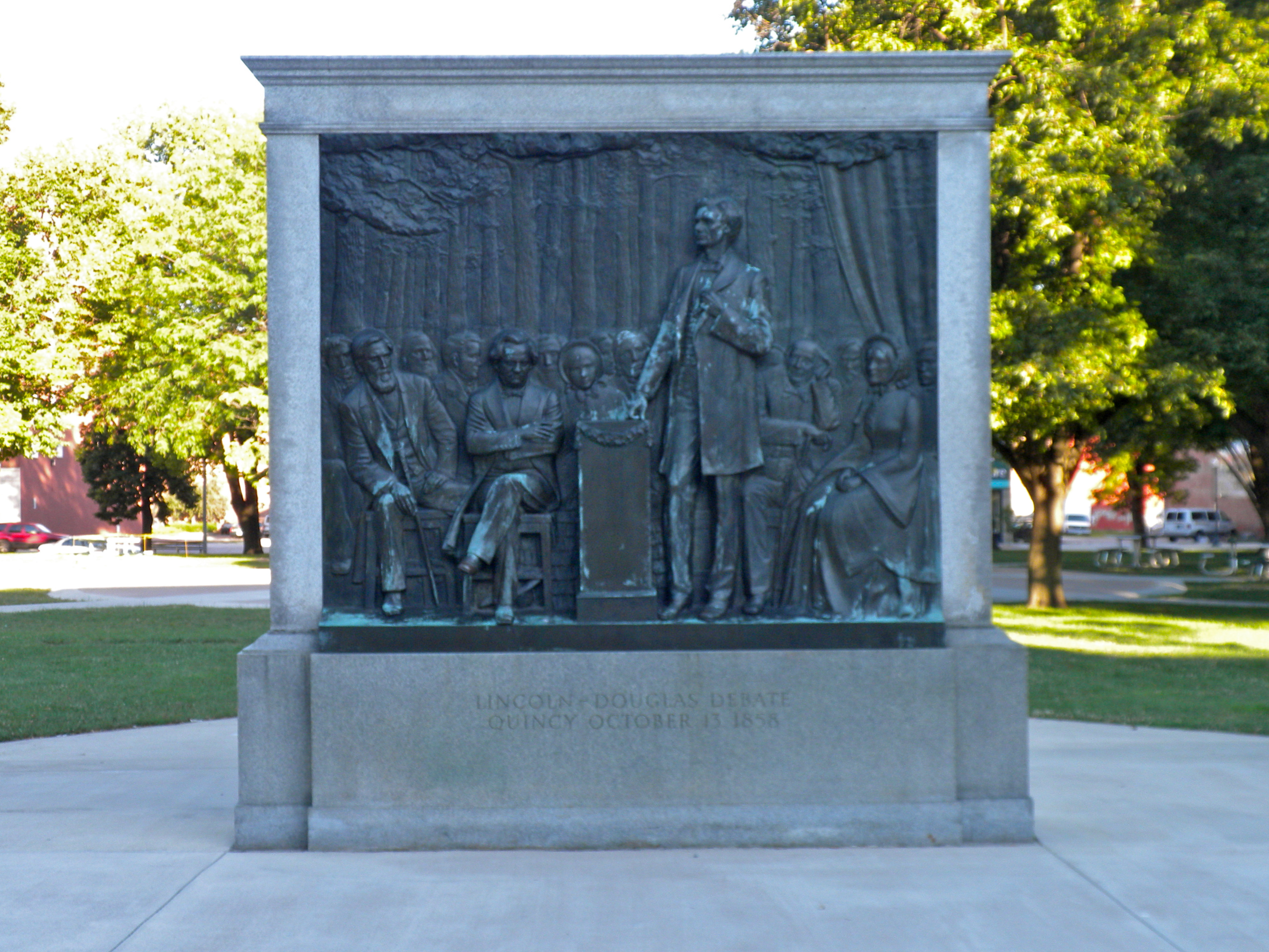
Lincoln - Douglas Debate, Quincy, October 13, 1858. (1936), Quincy, Illinois

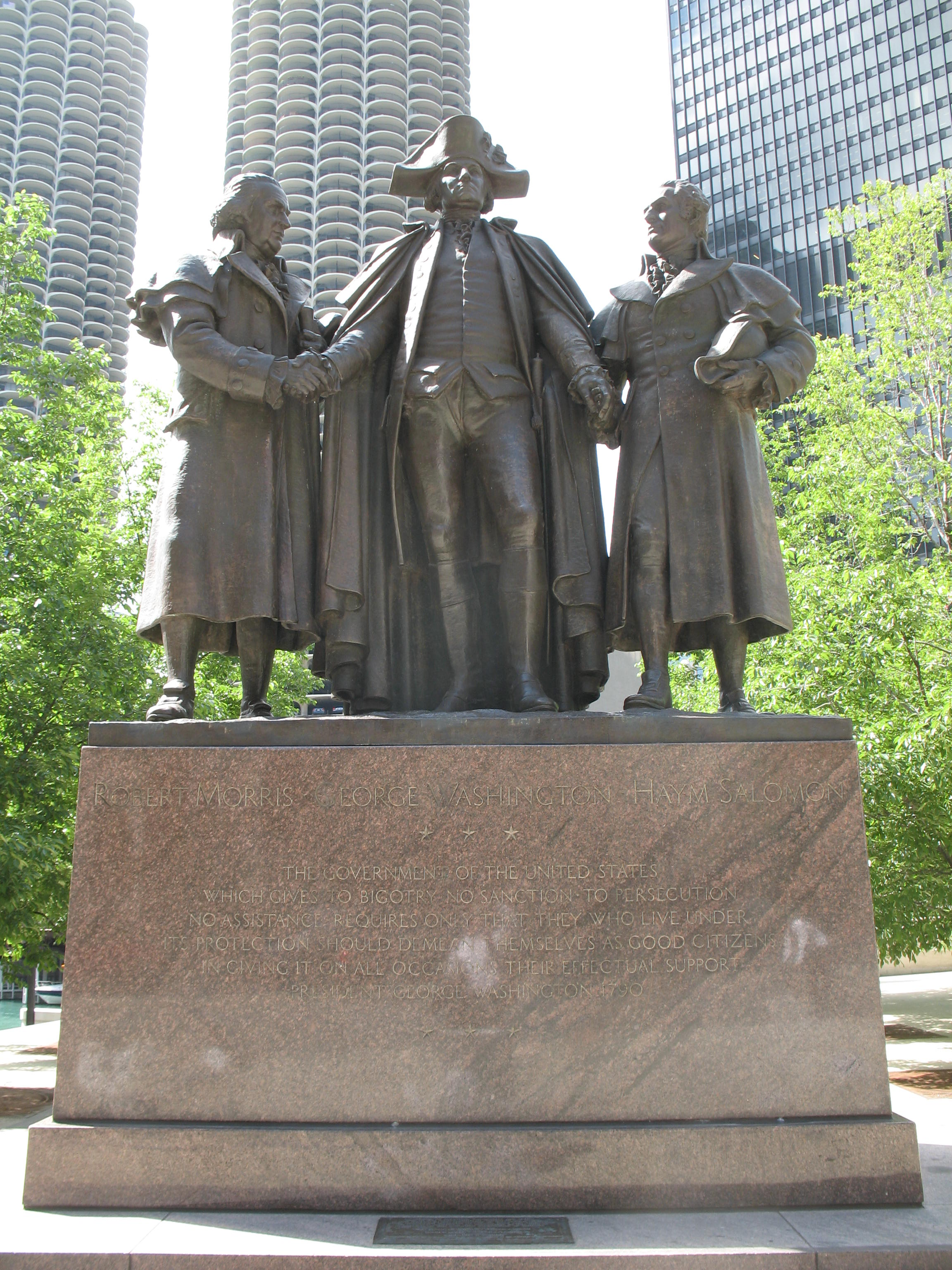
Heald Square Monument (1936–1941), Chicago, Illinois. Completed by Leonard Crunelle, Nellie Walker and Fred Torrey.

== Students and assistants ==
During his long career, Taft acted as a mentor and teacher for many sculptors, including:

- Enrique Alférez
- Jean Pond Miner Coburn
- Alice Cooper
- Leonard Crunelle
- Ulric Ellerhusen
- Paul Fjelde
- Sherry Edmundson Fry
- Waylande Gregory
- Carl Augustus Heber
- Frederick Hibbard
- Mary Lawrence
- Evelyn Beatrice Longman
- Frances Loring
- Carol Brooks MacNeil
- Helen Farnsworth Mears
- Lou Wall Moore
- Charles Mulligan
- William Clark Noble
- C. Adrian Pillars
- Trygve Rovelstad
- Belle Kinney Scholz
- Janet Scudder
- Clara Sorensen
- John Storrs
- Charles Umlauf
- Bessie Potter Vonnoh
- Nellie Walker
- Julia Bracken Wendt
- Florence Wyle
- Enid Yandell

== Additional sources ==
- Bach, Ira; Lackritz Gray, Mary (1983). Chicago's Public Sculpture. Chicago: University of Chicago Press.
- Barnard, Harry (1971). This Great Triumvirate of Patriots – The inspiring story behind Lorado Taft's Chicago Monument to George Washington, Robert Morris and Haym Solomon. Chicago: Follett Publishing. ISBN 9780695802721.
- Contemporary American Sculpture. The California Palace of the Legion of Honor, Lincoln Park, San Francisco: The National Sculpture Society. 1929.
- Craven, Wayne (1968). Sculpture in America. New York: Thomas Y. Crowell Co.
- "156th Street of Broadway New York". Exhibition of American Sculpture Catalogue. The National Sculpture Society. 1923.
- Garvey, Timothy J. (1988). Public Sculptor – Lorado Taft and the Beautification of Chicago. Urbana, Illinois: University of Illinois Press. ISBN 9780252015014.
- Goode, James M. (1974). The Outdoor Sculpture of Washington, D.C. Washington, D.C.: Smithsonian Institution Press. ISBN 9780874741384.
- Kubly, Vincent (1977). The Louisiana Capitol—Its Art and Architecture. Gretna, Louisiana: Pelican Publishing Company. ISBN 9781455607730.
- Kvaran, Einar Einarsson. Architectural Sculpture of America (unpublished manuscript)
- Lanctot, Barbara (1988). A Walk Through Graceland Cemetery. Chicago: Chicago Architecture Foundation.
- Fielding, Mantle (1986). Opitz, Glenn B. (ed.). Mantle Fielding's Dictionary of American Painters, Sculptors & Engravers. Poughkeepsie, New York: Apollo. ISBN 9780938290049.
- Rubenstein, Charlotte Streifer (1990). American Women Sculptors. Boston: G.K. Hall & Co. ISBN 9780816187324.
- Scheinman, Muriel (1995). A Guide to the Art of the University of Illinois. Urbana, Illinois: University of Illinois Press. ISBN 9780252064425.
- Scherrer, Anton (April 18, 1939). "Our Town". Indianapolis Times.
- Taft, Lorado (1903). History of American Sculpture. New York: The MacMillan Company. pp. 544.
- Taft, Lorado (1921). Modern Tendencies in Sculpture. University of Chicago Press. p. 152.
- Weller, Allen Stuart (1985). Lorado in Paris – the Letters of Lorado Taft 1880–1885. Urbana, Illinois: University of Illinois Press. ISBN 9780252011078.
