= Frank Rattray Lillie =

American zoologist (1870–1947)

- Born: June 27, 1870; Toronto, Ontario, Canada
- Died: November 5, 1947 (aged 77); Chicago, Illinois, U.S.
- Education: University of Toronto
- Awards: Alexander Agassiz Medal (1939)
- Scientific career
- Fields: Zoology
- Workplaces: University of Michigan; Vassar College; University of Chicago; National Academy of Sciences; United States National Research Council; Marine Biological Laboratory; Woods Hole Oceanographic Institution

Frank Rattray Lillie (June 27, 1870 – November 5, 1947) was an American zoologist and an early pioneer of the study of embryology. Born in Toronto, Ontario, Canada, Lillie moved to the United States in 1891 to study for a summer at the Marine Biological Laboratory (MBL) in Woods Hole, Massachusetts. Lillie formed a lifelong association with the laboratory, eventually rising to become its director in 1908. His efforts developed the MBL into a full-time institution.

Lillie was appointed an assistant professor at the University of Chicago in 1900. He was named Chairman of the Department of Zoology in 1910 and Dean of the Division of Biological Sciences in 1931. His research there was instrumental in the development of the field of embryology. He identified the influence of potassium on cell differentiation and elucidated the biological mechanisms behind free-martins. Lillie was instrumental in founding the Woods Hole Oceanographic Institution and served as its first president. He also served at times as the chairman of the National Academy of Sciences and the United States National Research Council. He was also an elected member of both the American Philosophical Society and the American Academy of Arts and Sciences.

== Biography ==
Frank Rattray Lillie was born on June 27, 1870, in Toronto, Ontario, Canada. His father was a wholesale druggist and accountant. After attending a laboratory school as a youth, Lillie enrolled at the University of Toronto. Originally intending to study theology, Lillie came under the tutelage of Robert Ramsay Wright and Archibald Macallum, who influenced Lillie to study endocrinology and embryology. Lillie graduated in 1891 and moved to the United States. He accepted a summer position at the Marine Biological Laboratory (MBL) in Woods Hole, Massachusetts, then became a fellow in zoology at Clark University, where he studied under Charles Otis Whitman.

In 1892 he was lured by Whitman to the newly founded University of Chicago. In 1894 (at the age of 24) he received the degree of Doctor of Philosophy in Zoology summa cum laude. Between 1894 and 1899 he was instructor of zoology at University of Michigan. He married Frances Williams Crane, whom he met at MBL, June 29, 1895. Crane was the daughter of wealthy Chicago businessman Richard T. Crane. Between 1899 and 1900 he was Professor of Biology at Vassar College but in 1900 he was called back to Chicago as assistant professor of zoology, where he would spend the next thirty years. In 1906, at the age of 36, he became Professor of Embryology. In 1910 he succeeded Whitman as Chairman of the Department of Zoology and continued in that capacity until 1931. From 1931 to 1935 he was Dean of the Division of the Biological Sciences.

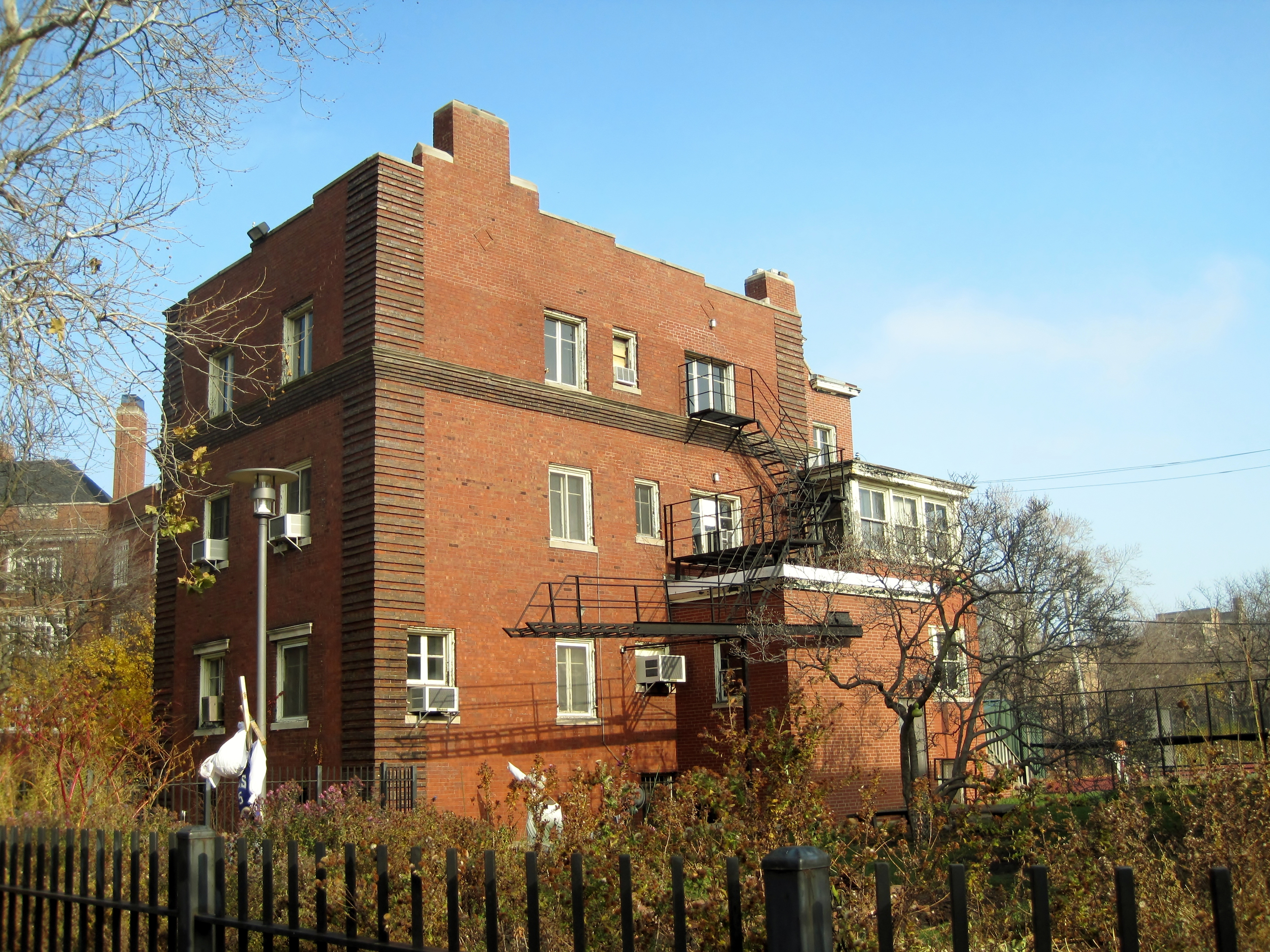
While in Chicago, Lillie lived at this house. It has since been recognized as a National Historic Landmark as a building of national significance.

While researching at the University of Chicago, Lillie also became active in the administration of the MBL. Lillie became assistant director of the laboratory in 1900. In 1902, Lillie was able to convince representatives from the Rockefeller Foundation, Carnegie Corporation of New York, General Education Board, and brother-in-law Charles Richard Crane to provide the institution with financial support. After Whitman retired in 1908 to chair the zoology department, Lillie took his place as the director of the laboratory. He held this position until 1925, when he was appointed the president of the MBL board of trustees. Lillie oversaw the board until his retirement in 1942. Ernest Everett Just studied under Lillie from 1909 to 1930. He is credited with transforming the institution from a summer retreat to a long-term research institution.

At a 1925 meeting of the National Academy of Sciences (NAS), Lillie suggested that a committee be formed to begin a national oceanography organization. The NAS agreed if Lillie could raise funds for its establishment. With a $3 million grant from the Rockefeller Foundation, Lillie was able to establish the Woods Hole Oceanographic Institution in 1930. He was named its first president and served in this role until 1939. Lillie was awarded the Alexander Agassiz Medal by the NAS in 1940 for his efforts.

The American Society of Zoologists named Lillie the organization's representative to the United States National Research Council (NRC) Division of Biology and Agriculture in 1919. Three years later, he was named the chair of the division. From 1935 to 1939 he was served as President of the NAS. From 1935 to 1936, he was also Chairman of the NRC. Lillie served on the fellowship board of the latter institution for several years after his term expired.

Lillie had four daughters and adopted three sons. He died in Chicago on November 5, 1947. A building on the MBL campus is named after Lillie. On May 11, 1976, the National Park Service recognized Lillie's house in Chicago as a National Historic Landmark.

== Research ==
Embryology was still a relatively new field when Lillie began his studies. In 1901, Lillie published his first major work on the subject. After exposing eggs to abnormal concentrations of potassium, Lillie noted that unsegmented eggs underwent cellular differentiation in the absence of mitosis. In 1919, Lillie summarized his findings to that point in Problems of Fertilization, where he concluded that fertilization was a series of timed and irreversible events.

Lillie was also a pioneer in the study of sex steroids in sexual differentiation. He published "The Theory of the Free-martin" in Science in 1917, which found that sex steroids in the blood controlled differentiation. Free-martins, sterile female cows born without sex organs, were a perplexing issue for cattle ranchers. Lillie found that free-martins formed when twins shared the same placenta. The hormones from the male twin would then be shared with the female, stunting the growth of her reproductive system.

== Eugenics ==
Lillie was involved in the American eugenics movement at multiple levels: he was member of Chicago's Eugenics Education Society, he was a committee member of the Second International Eugenics Congress, and he served on the advisory council for the Eugenics Committee of the United States. Lillie's status as a first-rate scientist likely helped to legitimize eugenics.
