= Frank R. Lillie House =

Historic house in Chicago, Illinois

- U.S. National Register of Historic Places
- U.S. National Historic Landmark
- U.S. Historic district – Contributing property
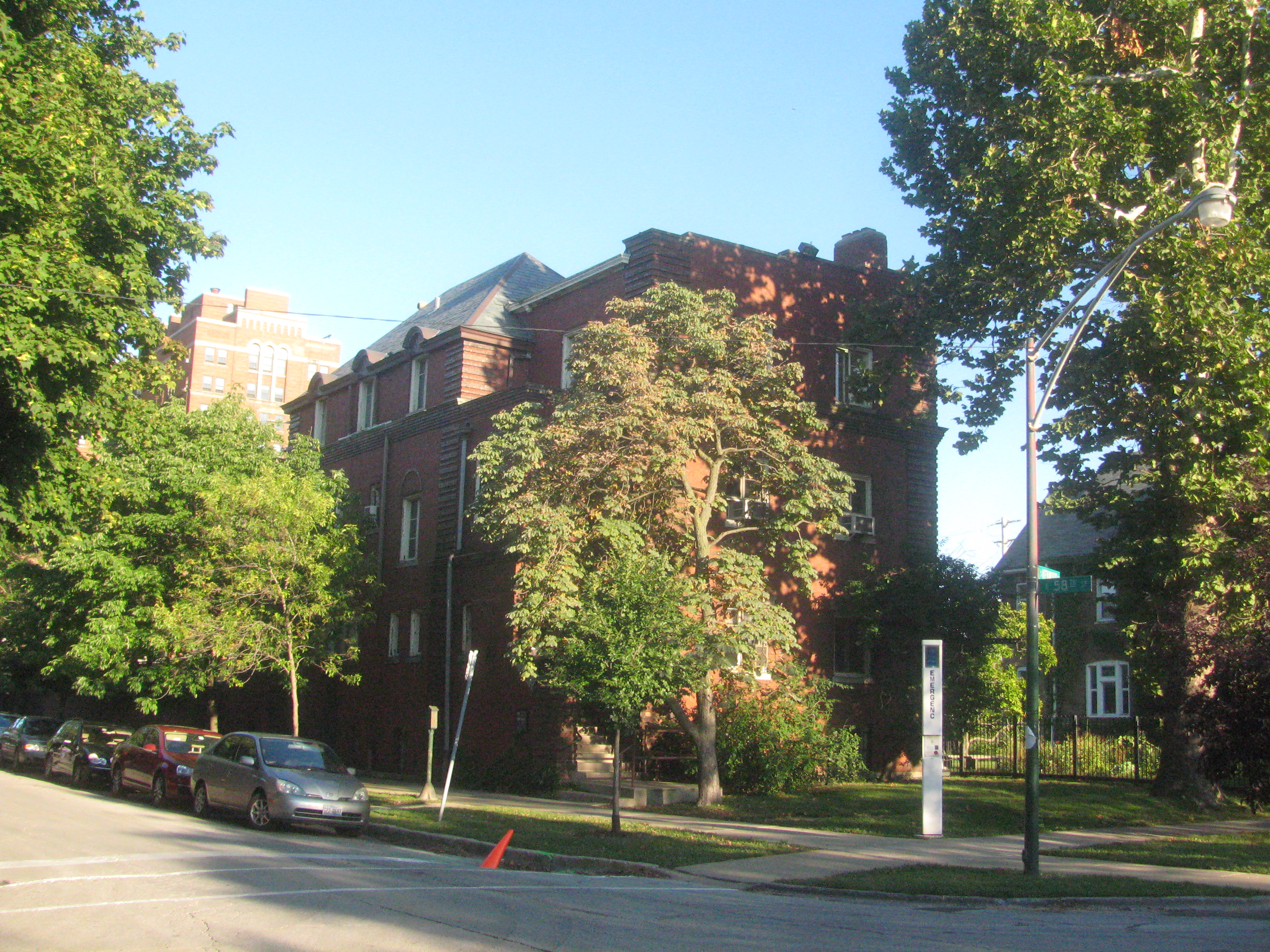

- Location within Illinois
- Location: 5801 South Kenwood Ave., Chicago, IL
- Coordinates: 41°47′21.98″N 87°35′34.2″W
- Built: 1904
- Architect: Pond and Pond
- Architectural style: Chicago
- Part of: Hyde Park–Kenwood Historic District (ID79000824)
- NRHP reference No.: 76000696

Significant dates
- Added to NRHP: May 11, 1976
- Designated NHL: May 11, 1976

The Frank R. Lillie House is a historic house at 5801 South Kenwood Avenue, on the campus of the University of Chicago on the South Side of Chicago, Illinois. Built in 1904 to a design by Pond and Pond, it was home for many years to Frank R. Lillie (1870–1947), a pioneering embryologist and influential supporter of the Woods Hole Oceanographic Institute. Designated a National Historic Landmark in 1976, it is now used by the university as office space.

== Description and history ==
The Frank R. Lillie House stands in Chicago's Hyde Park neighborhood, on the east side of the University of Chicago campus at the southeast corner of South Kenwood Avenue and East 58th Street. It is an architecturally eclectic brick three story building, built in 1904 for Frank Lillie and his family to a design by Pond and Pond. It is characterized by flat surfaces with diamond-shaped brickwork, unusually shaped brick corner quoining, and a variety of roof treatments. The interior has retained many of its original finishes despite conversion of the space to academic functions by the university.

Frank Lillie was a native of Toronto who was educated at the University of Toronto and the University of Chicago, receiving a Ph.D. summa cum laude from the latter in 1894. From an early date he cultivated an interest in embryology, a field then in its infancy. He made several groundbreaking discoveries, notably determining that the sex of embryos was determined by particular hormones in their blood supply. This contributed to the establishment of endocrinology as a major area of study. Lillie was also an important figure in the science organizations, garnering significant financial support for the Woods Hole Oceanographic Institute (where he had spent a summer as a student), and helping it become a major scientific research institute.

Lillie bequeathed his house to the University of Chicago, reserving a life interest for his wife. The university took over the building in 1957, and has used it for a variety of purposes. It presently houses the offices of the Chicago Review.

== See also ==
- National Register of Historic Places listings in South Side Chicago
- List of National Historic Landmarks in Illinois
