= Freemartin =

Infertile cow with XX/XY chromosomes

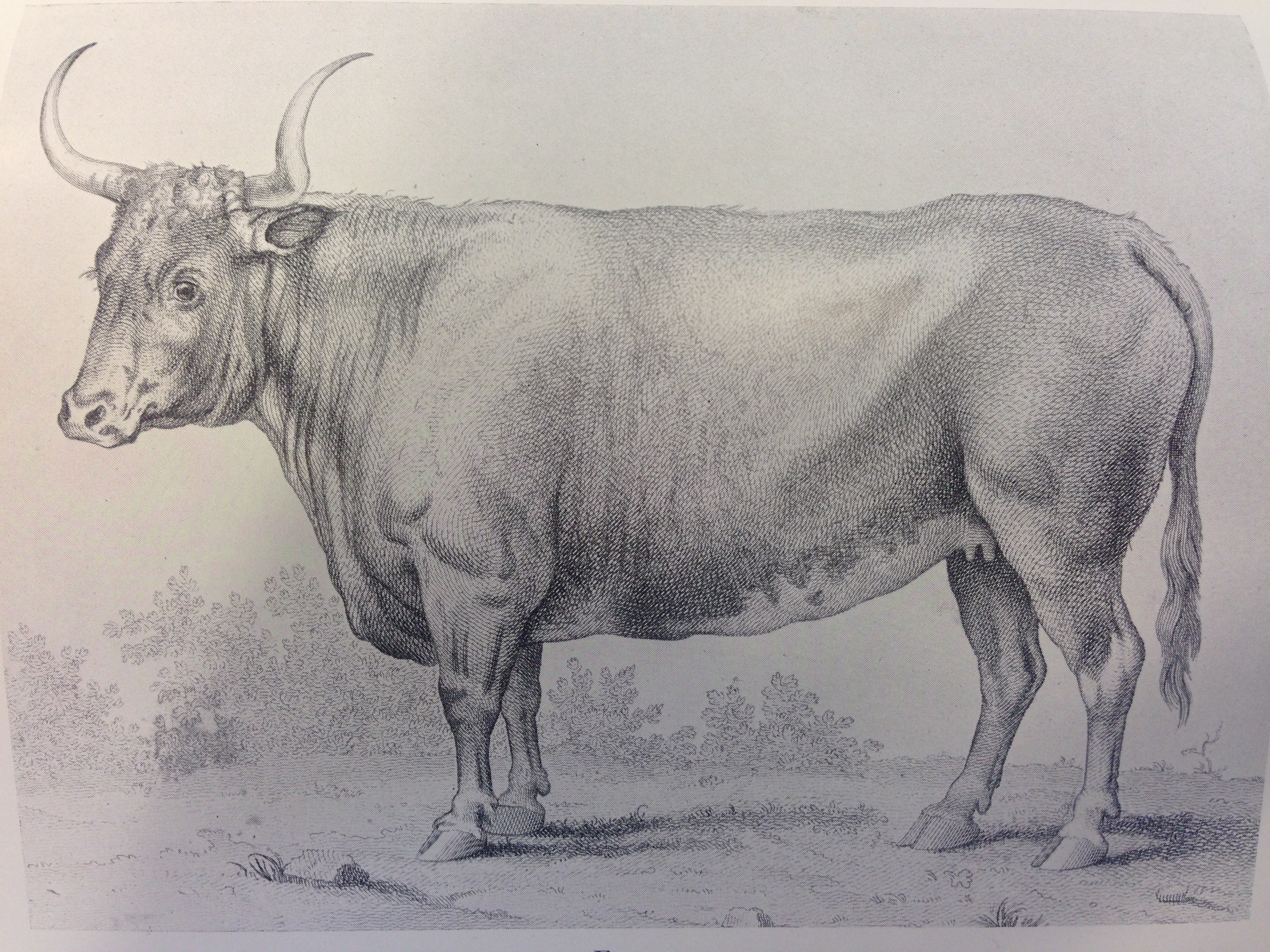
A plate showing a "Free Martin" from the collected works of John Hunter.

A freemartin or free-martin (sometimes martin heifer) is an infertile cow with masculinized behavior and non-functioning ovaries. Such a cow is born as one of a pair of twins, with a male calf as the other twin. Phenotypically, the animal appears female, but various aspects of her female reproductive development were altered due to acquisition of anti-Müllerian hormone from the male twin. Genetically, the animal is chimeric: karyotypy of a sample of cells shows XX/XY chromosomes. The animal originates as a female (XX), but acquires the male (XY) component in utero by exchange of some cellular material from a male twin, via vascular connections between placentas. Such cows provide an example of microchimerism. The chimerism is mainly present in the hematopoietic stem cells.

== History ==
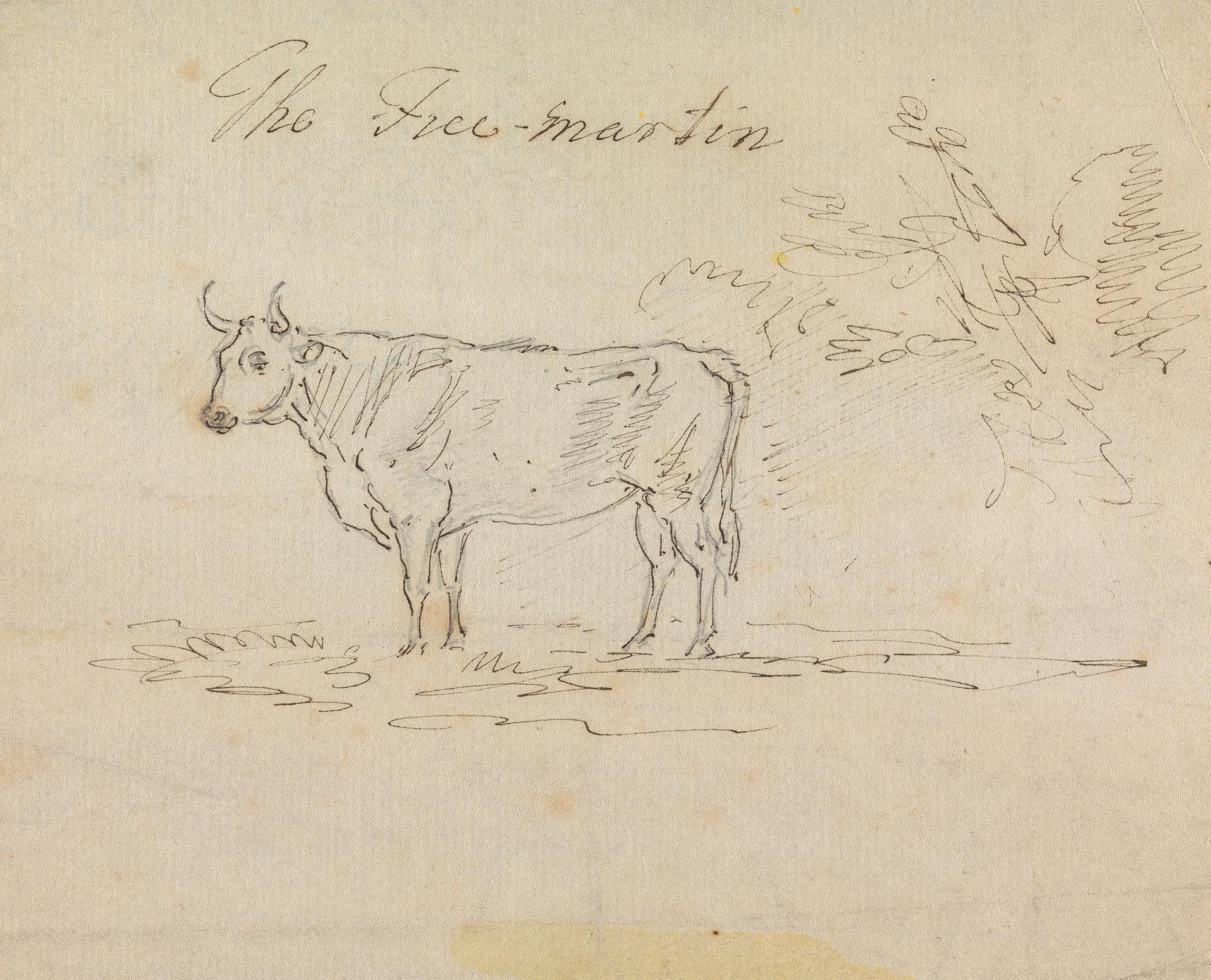
The Free-Martin (Sawrey Gilpin)

The phenomenon of sterile cows being born as twins to bulls is known to have been described by the Roman writer Varro, who called these sterile females "taura".

The 18th century physician John Hunter discovered that a freemartin always has a male twin. Hunter's 1779 description of freemartins is the oldest known anatomical description of these animals. Following Hunter, most descriptions of freemartins considered them to be modified females, although a few writers believed them to be modified males or were unsure of their origins. Classification was complicated by the fact that different forms of genital development were found in different freemartins, including both male-like and absent genitals being recorded from freemartins outwardly resembling cows. Their origin was also disputed, as some scholars believed freemartins and their bull siblings to be identical twins originating from a division of a single zygote, which would make freemartins genetically male. However, the occurrence of identical twins in cattle is itself disputed, as studies of cattle embryos and fetuses showed twins to consistently have distinct corpora lutea, the remains of the ovarian follicle from which an ovum is released, indicating that cattle twins are almost always fraternal.

It was hypothesized early in the 20th century that masculinizing factors travel from the male twin to the female twin through the vascular connections of the placenta because of the vascular fusion and affect the internal anatomy of the female.

Several researchers made the discovery that a freemartin results when a female fetus has its chorion fuse in the uterus with that of a male twin. The result was published in 1916 by Tandler and Keller. The discovery that cattle twins are typically contained within a single placenta and share blood flow, leading to the formation of male-like characteristics in female twins, was made independently by American biologist Frank R. Lillie, who published it in Science in 1916. Both teams are now credited with the discovery. Further study of Lillie's specimens by Catharine Lines Chapin in 1917 determined that in cattle, sex-determinant cells develop in the testes at an earlier period than they do in the ovary, explaining how male sexual development consistently "overrode" female development in these cases, as male hormones would appear in the shared blood system first and affect the development of the female twin before its own sexual anatomy would begin forming.

In rural areas folklore often claimed this condition was not just peculiar to cattle, but extended also to human twins. This belief perpetuated for generations, as was mentioned in the writings of Cuthbert Bede.

=== Etymology ===
The etymology of the term "freemartin" is uncertain: speculations include that "free" may indicate "willing" (referring to the freemartin's willingness to work) or "exempt from reproduction" (referring to its sterility, or to a farmer's decision to not bother trying to breed a freemartin, or both), or that it may be derived from the Flemish word varvekoe for a cow which gives no milk and/or has ceased to be capable of bearing offspring; "martin" is generally held to derive from an Irish or Gaelic word mart for "cow" or "heifer", although connections to Martinmas (when unproductive cattle were slaughtered) have also been posited.

== Mechanism ==
In most cattle twins, the blood vessels in the chorions become interconnected, creating a shared circulation for both twins. If both fetuses are the same sex this is of no significance, but if they are different, male cells pass from the male twin to the female twin, where they produce hormones (testosterone and anti-Müllerian hormone) that masculinize the female twin, resulting in a freemartin. The degree of masculinization is greater if the fusion occurs earlier in the pregnancy – in about ten percent of cases no fusion takes place and the female remains fertile.

Freemartins have been recorded from multiple births other than twins, including triplets and quadruplets. While some researchers speculated that the relative numbers of males and females would impact the degree to which freemartins develop male traits, other incidents showed cases where a single male in triplet or quadruplet groups caused the females to develop into freemartins in the same manner as a regular twin pair would. This led to the conclusion that the overall quantity of male hormones does not correlate strongly with the development of the female twins.

The male twin is largely unaffected by the fusion, although the size of the testicles may be slightly reduced. Testicle size is associated with fertility, so there may be some reduction in bull fertility. Freemartins behave and grow in a similar way to castrated male cattle (steers).

== Diagnosis ==
If suspected, a test can be done to detect the presence of the male Y-chromosomes in some circulating white blood cells of the subject. Genetic testing for the Y-chromosome can be performed within days of birth and can aid in the early identification of a sterile female bovine.

Physical examination of the calf may also reveal differences: a subjective assessment is that frequently there is a lengthened tuft of hair at the ventral tip of the vulva in a freemartin heifer atypical in fertile heifer calves. Also, often many (but not all) freemartins will have a shortened length of vagina compared with that of a fertile heifer. Commercial probes are available to check heifers for obvious freemartinism in lieu of performing a blood test.

== Other animals ==
A freemartin is the normal outcome of mixed twins in all cattle species which have been studied. It is most frequent in cattle and does not normally occur in most other mammals, though it has been recorded in sheep, goats, and pigs.

== Uses ==
Freemartins are occasionally used in stem cell and immunology research.

During fetal development cells are exchanged between the fused circulations of the bovine twins. Up to 95% of the freemartin's blood cells can be derived from those of her twin brother. Male-derived cells and their progeny can be easily visualised in the freemartin tissues, as only they contain the male Y chromosome. Thus, by analysing these tissues, one can investigate the capacity of hematopoietic stem cells or other circulating cells to produce other tissues in addition to blood. The freemartin model allows one to analyse perfectly healthy and unmanipulated animals, without resorting to transplantation often used in stem cell research.

== Fictional use ==
- In the Aldous Huxley novel Brave New World, a "freemartin" (mentioned in chapters 1, 3, 11 and 17) is a woman who has been deliberately made sterile by exposure to hormones during fetal development; in the book, government policy requires freemartins to constitute 70% of the female population. A side effect of this is some freemartin women having developed beards.
- The Robert A. Heinlein novel Beyond This Horizon lists "the clever and repulsively beautiful pseudo-feminine freemartins" as one of the genetically engineered specialist types of humans that were created in the "Empire of the Great Khans" (chapter 2).
- In the Robert Heinlein novel Farnham's Freehold, the protagonist, Hugh Farnham, is given a companion ("bedwarmer") that is described as a "natural freemartin".
- In the Avram Davidson story "The House the Blakeneys Built", the cattle are freemartins.
- In the fantasy book series Bazil Broketail by Christopher Rowley, "freemartin" is the name for a breed of sterile female dragons.
- In Footfall by Larry Niven and Jerry Pournelle, a lithely-built human woman uses the term "freemartin" to describe herself, while doubting her sexuality.
- In Nicola Griffith's novel Hild, the title character is sometimes referred to by others as a freemartin, in reference to her non-feminine character and social role.
- In Lauren Groff's novel Matrix (New York: Riverhead Books, 2021), 12th-century English peasants use freemartins to pull wagons.
