= Michigan Union =

Coordinates: 42.27523°N 83.74123°W

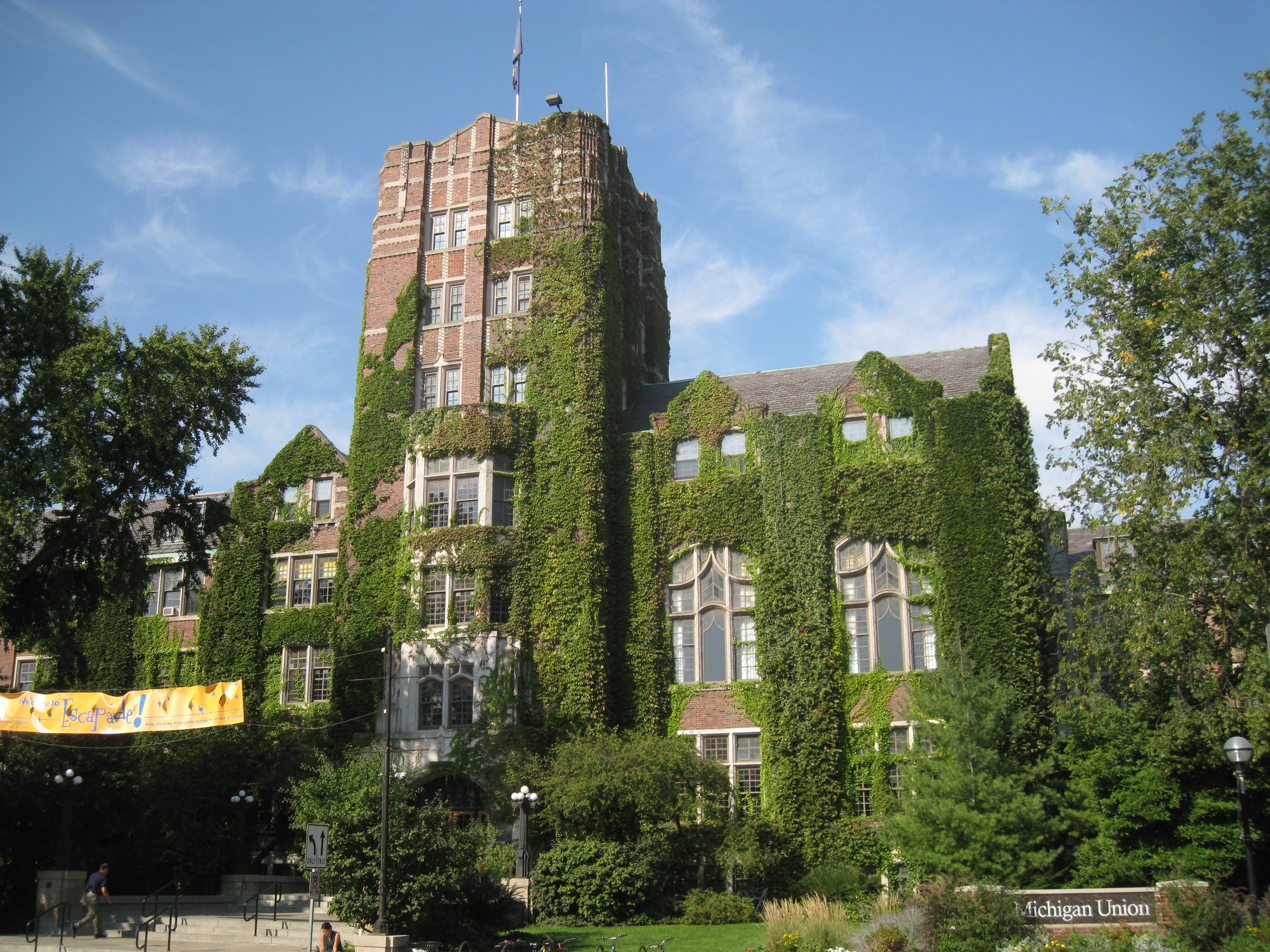
- Interactive map of the Michigan Union area

General information
- Type: Student union
- Location: 530 South State Street; Ann Arbor, Michigan, United States 48109
- Groundbreaking: 1916
- Opened: 1919
- Renovated: 1936, 1938, 1954-55 (expansions); 1994, 2018 (renovations)

Technical details
- Floor count: 7

Design and construction
- Architects: Irving Kane Pond and Allen Bartlit Pond

Website
- uunions.umich.edu/munion

The Michigan Union is a student union at the University of Michigan. It is located at the intersection of South State Street and South University Avenue in Ann Arbor, Michigan. The building was built in 1917 and is one of several unions at the University of Michigan.

== History ==
West & east elevations of Michigan Union, sheet 1, 29 January 1917, revised 4 September 1917

The Michigan Union was at first a student group rather than a building. The Michigan Union formed in 1904 as "an 'all-inclusive organization' focused on providing feelings of unity for men on campus." Its first meeting, at Waterman Gymnasium, drew more than 1,100 students. The founders of the Michigan Union soon desired a home for the organization. In 1907, they purchased the former house of Judge Thomas M. Cooley, a longtime University of Michigan Law School professor on State Street at the end of South University Avenue. Cooley's home was a "spacious, rambling fieldstone structure, with pointed gables." After the Michigan Union acquired the Cooley home, Professor Emil Lorch of the Department of Architecture made alterations for adaptation as a clubhouse. On the first floor was a large dining room, a smaller dining room, a large lounge, a game room, and a kitchen; on the second floor was a billiard room, a reading room, a directors' room, and an apartment for the steward.

The Union soon outgrew the building, and in 1910, the Michigan Union hired the architect brothers Irving Kane Pond and Allen Bartlit Pond to design a new building. The Union acquired two adjacent lots, one of which was owned by the Pond brothers. In 1916, the Cooley house was demolished and construction began. Funds for the building's construction were collected by collecting financial pledges. The progress of construction soon lagged, however, due to the American entry into World War I. While still unfinished, the building was used as a Students' Army Training Corps barracks and mess hall. After the end of the First World War, the Union interior was finally completed, and the building officially opened in 1919.

Irving Kane Pond (left) and sculptor Murphy at looking at Athletics statue at Michigan Union, 1918

The original Union building included a variety of facilities: a basement bowling alley, a groundfloor barbershop and cafe, and various "lounges, reading rooms, committee rooms, dining rooms, a billiard and games room, an assembly room, and accommodations for returning alumni." A swimming pool, planned for the building since its design, finally opened in 1925 after sufficient funds were collected to construct it.

The Michigan Union originally was organized as a club with yearly dues of $2.50; the club was run by a board of directors with representation of students, faculty, and alumni. "By 1914 there were over 4,000 members, which was a considerable portion of the University student body and indicative of the strength of the organization." In 1918 the Regents authorized that the membership fee, then $3, be collected from all students. The same year, the fee was increased to $5, and all male students automatically became Union Members.

Originally, women were only allowed to enter the building through the North entrance and when accompanied by a male escort, due to the founders' belief that the women's center at that time was in "the parlors of the Barbour Gymnasium."

In 1929, the Michigan League, designed by the Pond brothers, was built on North University Avenue as the women's union. In 1956, the policy of requiring escorts and of requiring women to enter through the North entrance was finally dropped. In 1968, the last place in the Union to have such a policy, the Billiards Room, ended its policy and admitted women on an equal basis.

Today, the Michigan Union houses restaurants, student organization office space, conference rooms, study areas, and other student resources. The Union is also an election precinct in state elections.

At the front steps of the Union, just above the main entrance, two statues stand on the left and the right. On the left is the athlete, facing towards south campus, home of the athletic fields and Michigan Stadium. To the right is the scholar, looking towards Central and North Campus, home of the student life of the University of Michigan.

In a speech delivered on the steps of the Michigan Union October 14, 1960 at 2:00 a.m., presidential candidate John F. Kennedy announced his Peace Corps proposal. A plaque at the steps now commemorates the event.

From April 2018 to January 2020, the Michigan Union was closed for renovations. These included the enclosing of the first floor courtyard, window restorations, elevator and restroom upgrades, and added study spaces.
