= Pond and Pond =

American architectural firm

Pond and Pond was an American architecture firm established by the Chicago architects Irving Kane Pond and Allen Bartlitt Pond.

== Overview ==
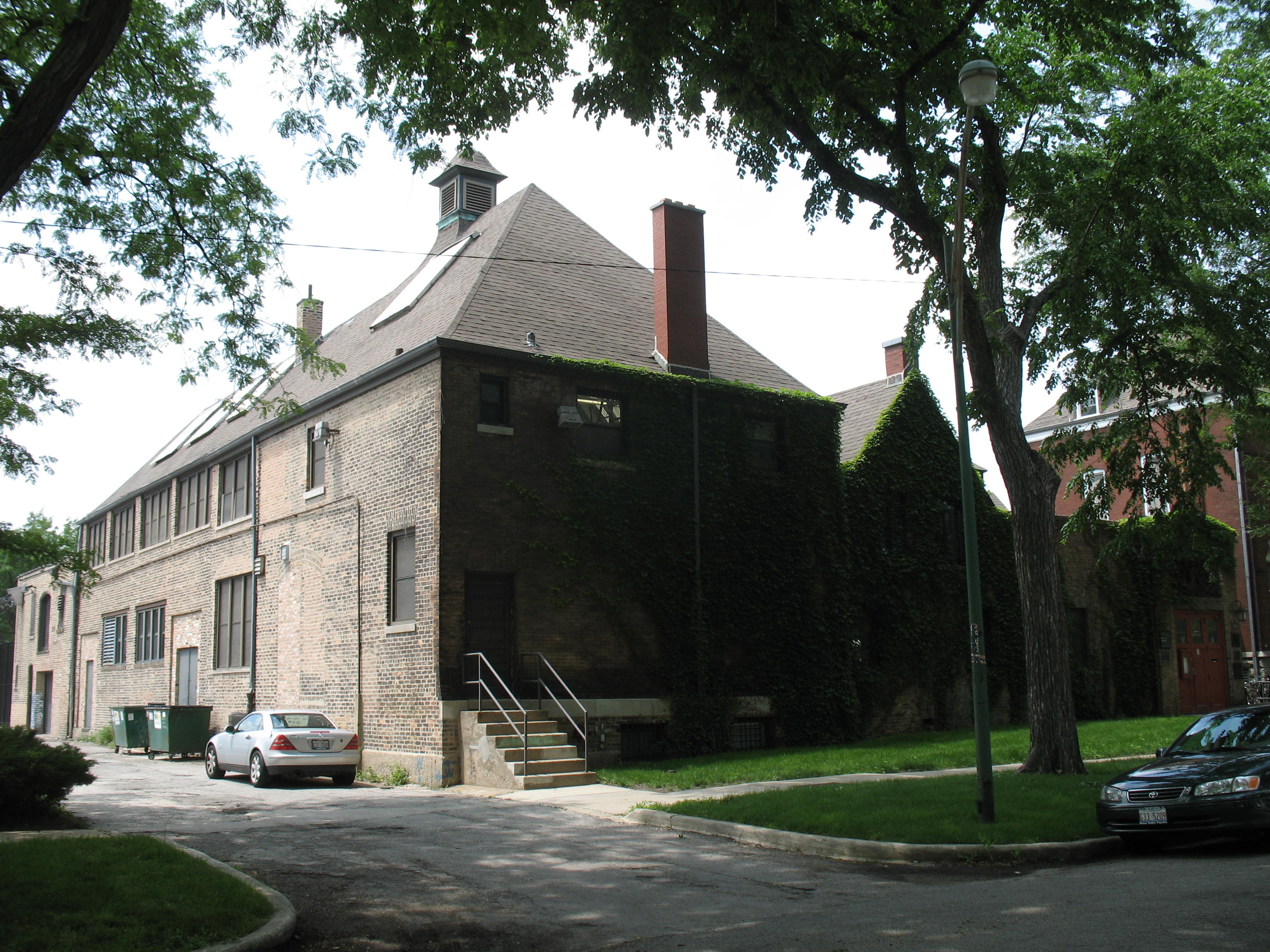
Lorado Taft Midway Studio, 1909

Working in the Arts and Crafts idiom, the brothers gained renown for elaborately detailed brickwork and irregular massing of forms. One of their earliest projects, in 1885, was a building for the Ladies Library Association of Ann Arbor, Michigan. Only the dated cornerstone survives—preserved in a stairwell of the present Ann Arbor Public Library.

Irving K. and Allen B. Pond were born in Ann Arbor, Michigan. Their father was newspaperman Elihu Pond, editor of the weekly Ann Arbor Argus. Jokingly called by friends "Ikey" and "Abie", after their initials, the two brothers attended the University of Michigan, where in 1879 they were pupils in architectural classes given by William LeBaron Jenney, who commuted from Chicago to deliver the first courses in architecture at Michigan. [Later, in the Home Insurance Building, Jenney developed the steel skeleton framework that made highrise buildings possible.]

The Pond brothers were part of an active artists' scene in Chicago that included Lorado Taft, Bert Leston Taylor, Jane Addams, and Harriet Monroe. The brothers were founding members of the Cliff Dwellers Club of Chicago, of the Eagle's Nest Art Colony in Ogle County, Illinois, and associated with Jane Addams' Hull House in Chicago, for whom they designed various buildings.

The firm was considered among the "earliest modernizers in architecture" in the period after the Great Chicago Fire.

The firm was also notable for its success in a new field of architectural design, that of large university student union buildings. Pond and Pond built student unions for the campuses of Purdue University, University of Michigan, Michigan State, and University of Kansas. One interesting note is that their most significant student union building, the Michigan Union, was built on the site of the brothers' boyhood home.

Allen Bartlitt Pond was born in Ann Arbor, MI, on November 21, 1858, and died in Chicago on March 17, 1929. Irving Kane Pond was born in Ann Arbor on May 1, 1857, and died in Washington, D. C., on September 29, 1939.

Architects trained through the firm of Pond and Pond include Andrew Willatsen. The firm's papers are housed in the Art Institute of Chicago.

== Selected commissions ==
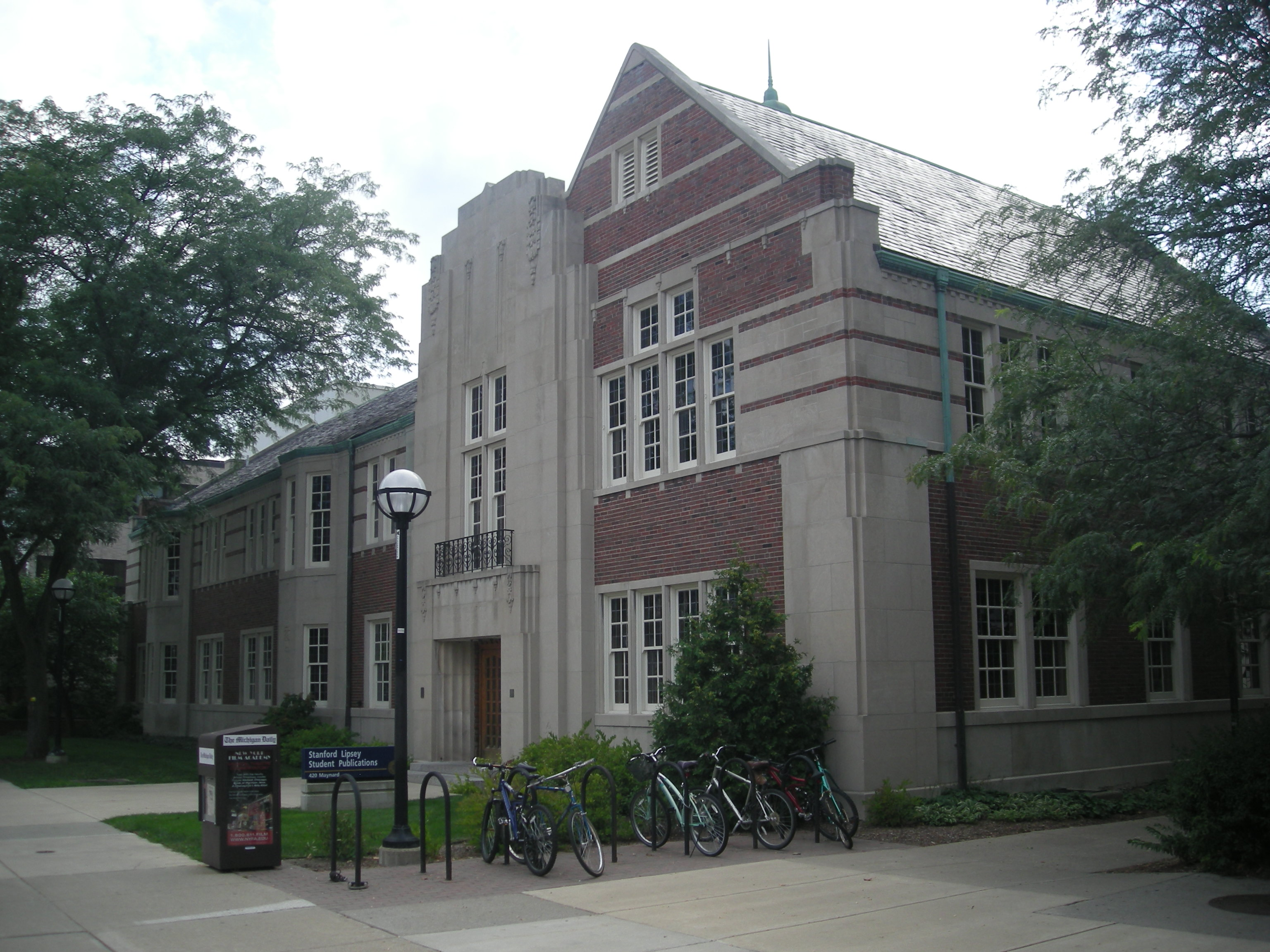
Stanford Lipsey Student Publications Building, University of Michigan (1932)

- Victor Clarence Vaughan House - Ann Arbor, MI (1882) Irving Pond
- West Physics Building (demolished 1966) - University of Michigan, Ann Arbor, MI (1887)
- J.C. Coonley House - Chicago, IL (1894)
- Paul C. Freer House - Ann Arbor, MI (1898)
- James Westfall Thompson House (now Faculty Housing) - Hyde Park, Illinois (1899)
- Eugene R. Hutchins Residence, 1429 N. Astor St. Chicago, IL 1890s
- Fred W. Job Residence, 4575 S. Oakenwald Ave. Chicago, IL 1890s
- Kasson Residence, 1442 Astor St. (formerly 148 Astor) Chicago, IL 1900s
- Chicago Commons Building - Chicago, IL (1901)
- Howe House - Evanston, Illinois 1905
- Kent Building/Kuppenheimer Warehouse - Chicago, Illinois (1905)
- Hull House Dining Halls - Chicago, Illinois (1905)
- Hull House, Coffee House - 800 S. Halsted St., Chicago, IL (1905)
- Geneva Lakes Family Y.M.C.A - Main and Wrigley Dr., Lake Geneva, WI (1905)
- American School of Correspondence Building - University of Chicago, Hyde Park, Illinois (1907)
- Lorado Taft Midway Studios - Hyde Park, Illinois (1909)
- Thalfried Estate - 565 East Deerpath, Park Ridge, IL (1909)
- Post Office - Kankakee, IL (1908)
- Oregon Public Library - Oregon, Illinois (1909)
- City Club Building - Chicago, Illinois (1910)
- Park Ridge Public Library - Park Ridge, IL (1912)
- Soldiers' Monument - Oregon, IL (1916)
- Michigan Union Building - University of Michigan, Ann Arbor, MI (1917)
- Big House, Los Alamos Ranch School - Los Alamos, New Mexico (1917)
- Purdue Memorial Union - West Lafayette, IN (1924)
- Student Union Building - Michigan State University, East Lansing, MI (1924)
- Manor House - Kenosha, Wisconsin (1926)
- Student Union Building - University of Kansas, Lawrence, Kansas (1927)
- Chicago Lighthouse for the Blind Building - Chicago, Illinois (1927)
- Michigan League Building - University of Michigan, Ann Arbor, MI (1929)
- Student Publications Building - 420 Maynard Street, University of Michigan, Ann Arbor, MI
- YMCA Building, 110 North Fourth Avenue, Ann Arbor, MI
- Baptist Home Missionary Training School - Chicago, IL
- Franklin Head Residence - Chicago, IL
- Highland Park Club House - Highland Park, IL
- Prairie Style Home: William F. Dummer, Coronado, CA
- Albany Park Presbyterian Church, 4850 N St. Louis Ave, Chicago, IL
