= Keith Preston =

American journalist

Keith Preston (1884–1927) was a Chicago-based literary critic, author and journalist.

Born in 1884, Preston had a strong academic background, holding a BA and PhD from the University of Chicago and an MA from Indiana University Bloomington. After receiving his PhD in philosophy in 1914, he married Etta Shield, another classics scholar. He then taught classics and philosophy at Indiana University, Princeton University, and Northwestern University.

In 1922 he left academe to join the staff of the Chicago Daily News as a columnist and literary editor. He was literary editor there and wrote 'The Periscope' and 'Hit or Miss' columns.

Preston published four volumes of his humorous poetry during his lifetime and his wife published a collection of his poems after his death. He died at age 42 in 1927.
