= List of contributing properties in the Oregon Commercial Historic District =

The properties on this List of contributing properties (Oregon Commercial Historic District) are part of the National Register of Historic Places. They joined the Register when the Oregon Commercial Historic District, in Oregon, Illinois, was designated in 2006.

== Government ==
- Columbiad Cannon
- Iron Mike (fountain)
- Oregon City Hall
- Parrott Cannon
- The Soldiers' Monument (Oregon, Illinois)
- U.S. Post Office (Oregon, Illinois)
- War Memorial (Oregon, Illinois)
- Well Pump House

== Listed separately ==
- Old Ogle County Courthouse
- Oregon Public Library

== Commercial ==
- 108 N. Fourth St.
- 114 N. Fourth St.
- 115 S. Fourth St.
- 116 N. Fourth St.
- 118 N. Fourth St.
- 121-123 S. Fourth St.
- 125 S. Fourth St.
- 127 S. Fourth St.
- 129 S. Fourth St.
- 137 S. Fourth St.
- 302-304 Franklin St.
- 131 N. Third St.
- 200 N. Third St.
- 217 Washington St.
- 219 Washington St.
- 221 Washington St.
- 223 Washington St.
- 300 Washington St.
- 301-305 Washington St.
- 302 Washington St.
- 307 Washington St.
- 311-315 Washington St.
- 314-316 Washington St.
- 317-319 Washington St.
- 414 Washington St.
- Bemis Motor Company Building
- Ben Franklin Store Building
- C.A.S. Ley Building
- F.G. Jones Block
- Jacobs Block
- Masonic Temple Lodge No. 420
- Oregon Manufacturing Company Building
- Rock River Hotel
- Schiller Piano Company and Iron Water Tower Base
- T. Goings Building
- Union Block Opera House
- Unity Building

== Other structures ==
- Oregon Coliseum

=== Bank buildings ===
- Ogle County National Bank Building
- Oregon State Savings Bank Building

=== Theater buildings ===
- Oregon Theater
- Lyon Theater
