= Rock River =

Rock River may refer to:

== Streams ==
=== Canada ===
- Rock River (Yukon), a tributary of the Bell River; see List of rivers of Yukon

=== United States ===
- Rock River (Mississippi River tributary), in Wisconsin and Illinois
- Rock River (Big Sioux River tributary), in Minnesota and Iowa
- Rock River (Lake Michigan), in Michigan
- Rock River (Lake Superior), in Michigan
- Rock River (Sturgeon River tributary), in Michigan
- Rock River (Lake Champlain), in northern Vermont
- Rock River (West River tributary), in southern Vermont
- Little Rock River, in Minnesota and Iowa

== Communities ==
- Rock River, Michigan, in Onota Township, Michigan, U.S.
- Rock River Township, Michigan, U.S.
- Rock River, Wyoming, U.S.
- Rock River, in Clarendon, Jamaica

== Other uses ==
- Rock River Arms, an American firearms company
- Rock River Generating Station, Wisconsin, U.S.
- Rock River Hotel, Illinois, U.S.
- Rock River Music, music branding agency in San Francisco, California and Putney, Vermont
- Rock River Raptors, professional indoor football team in Rockford, Illinois, U.S.
- Rock River Seminary, now Mount Morris College, in Mount Morris, Illinois, U.S.

== See also ==
- Rok River, in Sweden
- Rocky River (disambiguation)
