= Rocky River =

Rocky River may refer to:

== Localities ==
- Rocky River, Ohio, USA
- Rocky River, New South Wales near Uralla, Australia

== Electorates ==
- Electoral district of Rocky River (South Australia)

== Streams ==
In Australia:

- Rocky River (New South Wales)
- Rocky River (Queensland)
- Rocky River (Kangaroo Island) on Kangaroo Island in South Australia
- Rocky River (South Australia) in the Mid North of South Australia
- Rocky River (Victoria)

In Canada:

- Rocky River (Newfoundland) in Newfoundland-Labrador

In New Zealand:

- Rocky River (New Zealand) in the South Island

In the United States:

- Rocky River (Alaska)
- Rocky River (Connecticut)
- Rocky River (Michigan)
- Rocky River (North Carolina)
- Rocky River (Deep River tributary), a stream in North Carolina
- Rocky River (Ohio)
- Rocky River (South Carolina)
- Rocky River (Tennessee), a tributary of Caney Fork River

== See also ==
- Rock River (disambiguation)
