= Jacobs Block =

- U.S. Historic district – Contributing property
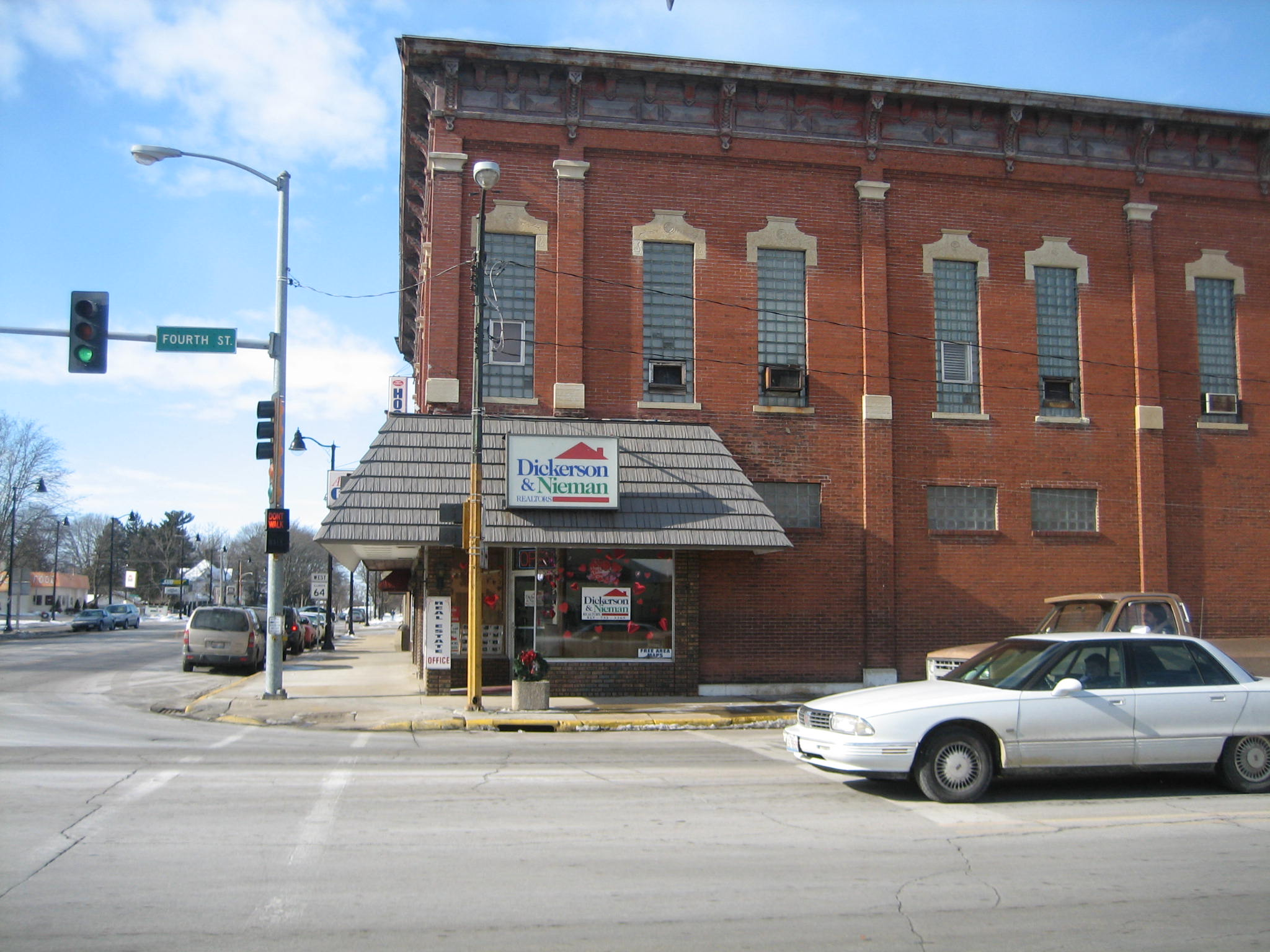

- Location within Illinois Location within the United States
- Location: Oregon, Ogle County, Illinois
- Coordinates: 42°00′53.17″N 89°19′57.84″W
- Built: c. 1870
- Architectural style: Italianate
- Part of: Oregon Commercial Historic District (ID06000713)
- Added to NRHP: August 16, 2006

The Jacobs Block, also known as the National Clothing House, is an 1870s historic building encompassing addresses in the 400 Block of Washington Street and the 100 Block of North Fourth Street in Oregon, Illinois. The Jacobs Block is part of Ogle County's only nationally designated historic district. The area, known as the Oregon Commercial Historic District, was added to the National Register of Historic Places in August 2006. The building, listed as a contributing structure to the historic district, is the Oregon Historic District's largest.
