= Oregon Coliseum =

- U.S. Historic district – Contributing property
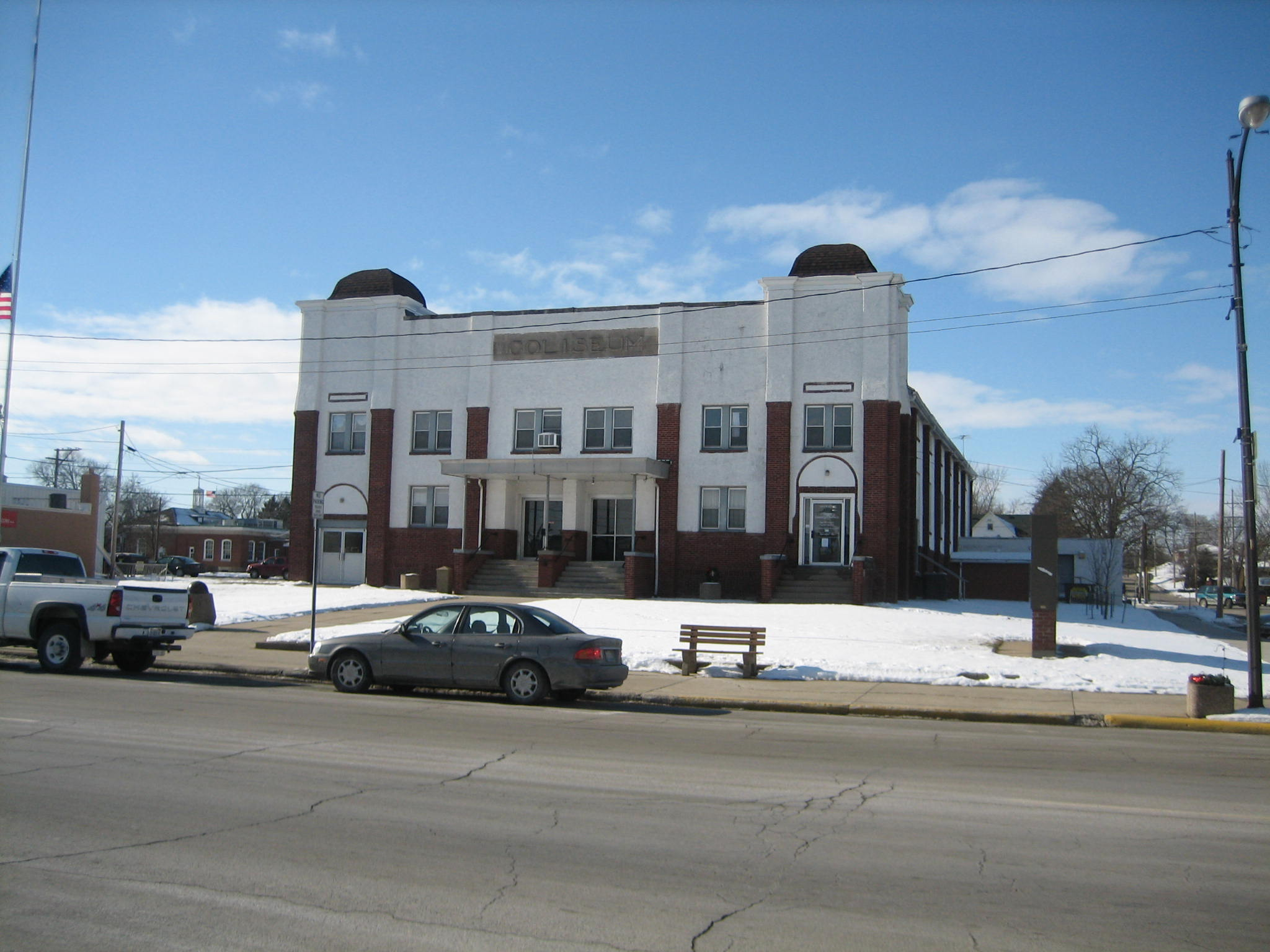

- Location within Illinois Location within the United States
- Location: Oregon, Ogle County, Illinois
- Coordinates: 42°00′56.2″N 89°19′59.2″W
- Built: 1922
- Architectural style: Art Deco
- Part of: Oregon Commercial Historic District (ID06000713)

The Oregon Coliseum is an art deco facility in the Ogle County, Illinois county seat of Oregon. It stands on the edge of the Oregon Commercial Historic District as a contributing structure to the overall integrity of the historic district. The coliseum was constructed in 1922 by the City of Oregon as city leaders sought to increase entertainment offerings in the city.
