= Masonic Temple Lodge No. 420 =

- U.S. Historic district – Contributing property
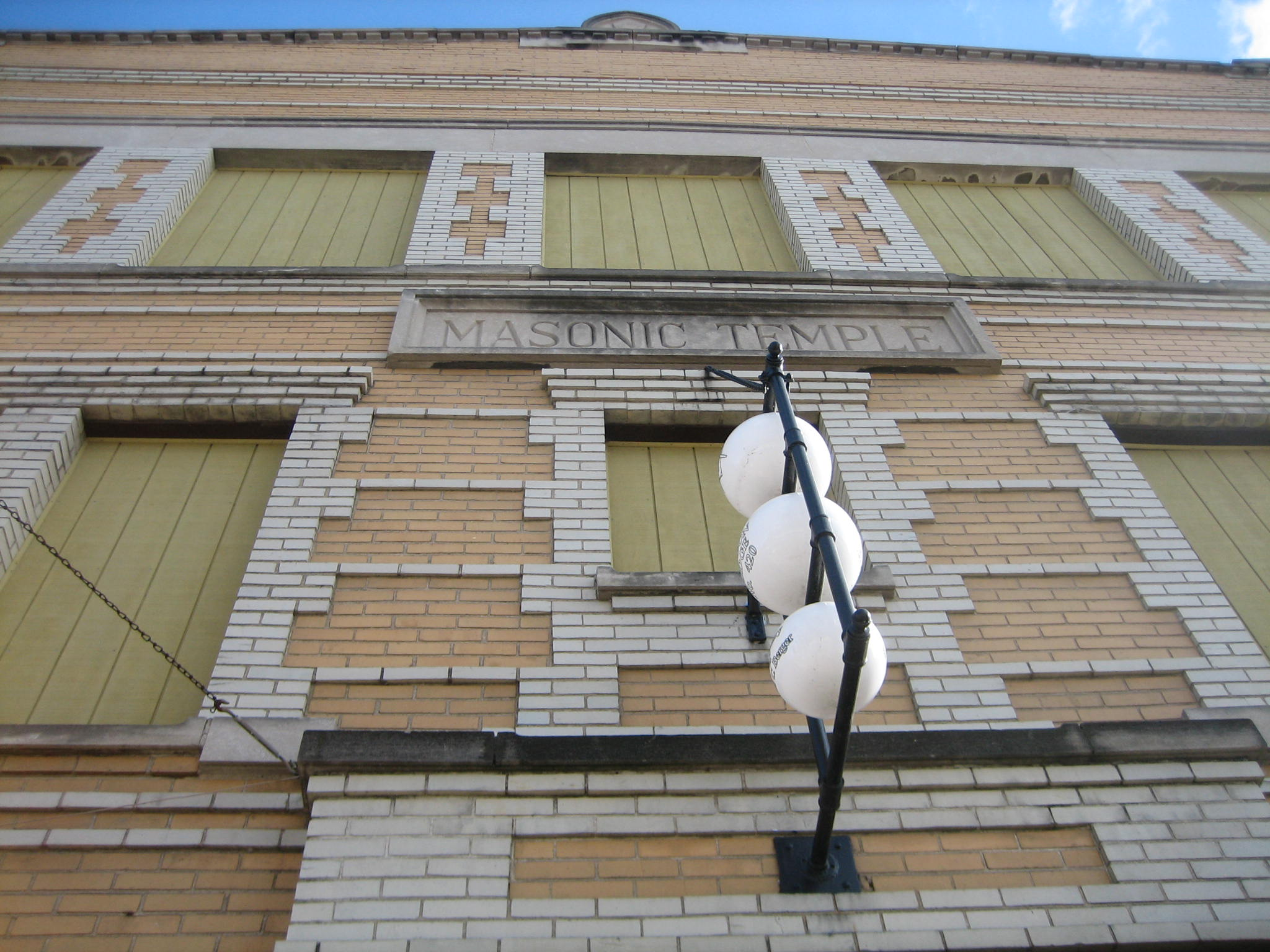
- Detailed ivory brick work is evident over the second and third floors of the Masonic Temple Lodge in Oregon, Illinois.
- Location: Oregon, Ogle County, Illinois, USA
- Coordinates: 42°00′50.36″N 89°19′56.41″W
- Built: c. 1900
- Part of: Oregon Commercial Historic District (ID06000713)
- Added to NRHP: August 16, 2006

The Masonic Temple Lodge No. 420 is a building in the Ogle County, Illinois city of Oregon. It has historically been known as 628-628 S. Fourth St. The building is one of several in the 100 Block of Oregon's South Fourth Street that is a contributing property to the Oregon Commercial Historic District, some others include the buildings at 125 S. Fourth St. and 127 S. Fourth St. As part of the historic district the Temple Lodge is listed on the National Register of Historic Places as of August 2006.

== Architecture ==
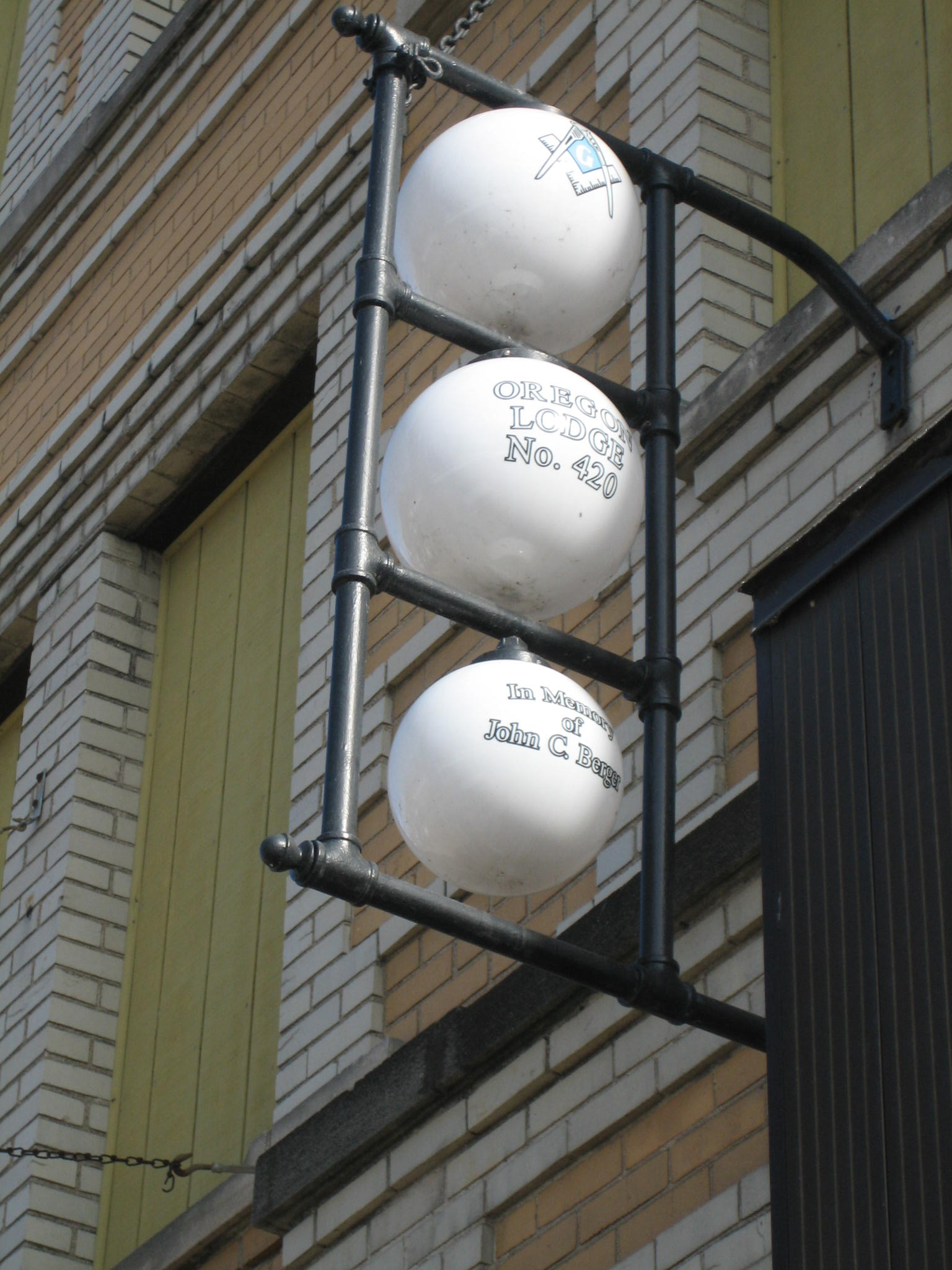
The hanging glass globe sign affixed to the facade of the Masonic Temple Lodge.

The circa 1900 Masonic Temple Lodge in downtown Oregon, Illinois is built in the Classical Revival style. A three-story yellow brick building, the facade is accented with ivory brick work. The ivory treatment creates a quoin effect on the upper stories through raised stretches of ivory colored brick. The second story windows, while boarded over, are laid out in sets of three surrounding a smaller central window. Between and surrounding the windows on the second story is extensive raised ivory brick work. The third floor windows, also boarded over, are set in a row of five, with, again, extensive brick work between the bays. Between the second and third story windows a name plate is engraved with "Masonic Temple."

At the apex of the building is a low pitched, triangular parapet/pediment. A central raised shield above the parapet is etched with the date "1900" as well as the Masonic emblem. Around the pediment is more ivory brick work, dentils and three corbelled courses. Dangling from the second story of the building, above the door, is a milk glass globe sign emblazoned with the lodge number, the Masonic symbol and a building dedication.

Most of the building's original doorways have been altered. On the building's interior is a main central staircase in a two-story entrance bay which leads to the upper floor. The entrance to the second floor, beyond the main central staircase, consists of a low ogee arch over a solid wood door. A lower transom is etched with the Masonic symbol.
