= Jack River (East Gippsland, Victoria) =

River in Victoria, Australia

Jack
- Mouth of the Jack River in Victoria

Location
- Country: Australia
- State: Victoria
- Region: South East Corner (IBRA), East Gippsland
- Local government area: Shire of East Gippsland

Physical characteristics
- Source
  - location: near Murrungowa
  - elevation: 122 m (400 ft)
- Mouth: confluence with the Brodribb River
  - location: Brodribb Flora Reserve
  - coordinates: 37°37′39″S 148°35′41″E
  - elevation: 27 m (89 ft)
- Length: 8 km (5.0 mi)

Basin features
- River system: Snowy River catchment
- Tributaries
  - left: Spring Creek (Victoria), Rocky River (Victoria)
- Nature reserve: Brodribb Flora Reserve

The Jack River is a perennial river of the Snowy River catchment, in the East Gippsland region of the Australian state of Victoria.

== Course and features ==
The Jack River rises in a state forestry area northwest of Murrungowa and flows generally southeast, joined by the Rocky River and one minor tributary before reaching its confluence with the Brodribb River, within the Brodribb Flora Reserve in the Shire of East Gippsland. The river descends 122 metres (400 ft) over its 8-kilometre (5.0 mi) course.

The catchment area of the river is administered by the East Gippsland Catchment Management Authority.

== See also ==
- List of rivers of Australia
