= Riverside Energy Center =

Electrical power station in Beloit, Rock County, Wisconsin

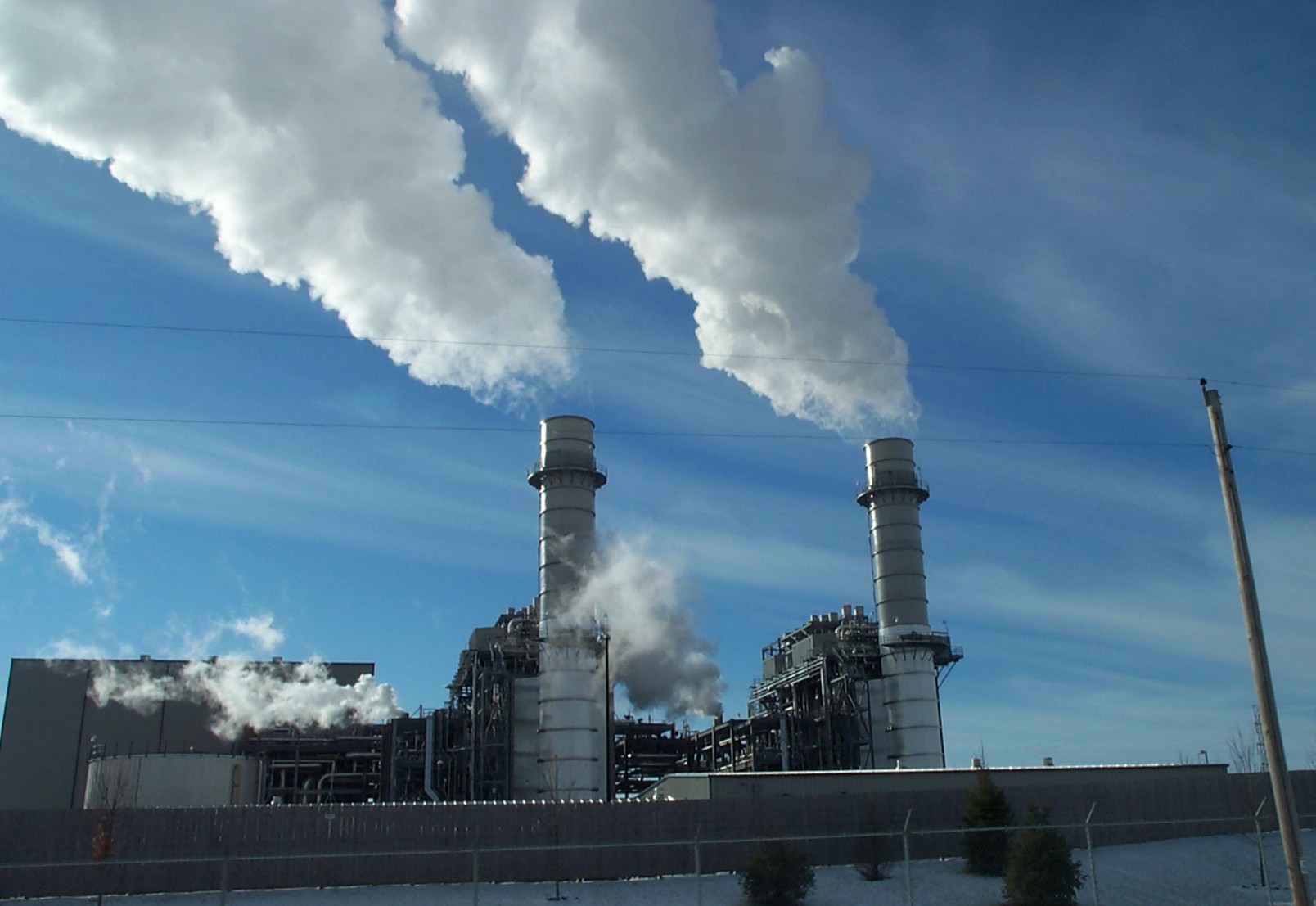
- Country: United States
- Location: Town of Beloit, Wisconsin
- Coordinates: 42°34′58″N 89°2′7″W
- Status: Base load
- Commission date: June 2004
- Owner: Alliant Energy

Thermal power station
- Primary fuel: Natural gas
- Turbine technology: GE combustion and Siemens Westinghouse steam
- Combined cycle?: Yes

Power generation
- Units operational: 2
- Nameplate capacity: 603 MW

Riverside Energy Center is an electrical power station located north of Beloit, Wisconsin in the Town of Beloit, just west of the Rock River. It consists of two 2-on-1 units (2 Combustion turbines per 1 Steam turbine). The facility is owned and operated by Alliant Energy.

== History ==
Riverside is a 603 MW combined cycle natural gas facility built by Calpine. It began producing power June 2004.

Purchase of the plant by Wisconsin Power & Light was approved by the Public Service Commission of Wisconsin in April 2011.

In November 2014, Alliant announced it planned to expand Riverside Energy Center with an additional $725 million, 650 MW, combined cycle natural gas generating facility. Alliant said they planned to begin construction in 2016 and be producing power in 2019.

== Adjacent facilities ==
There is an Alliant maintenance facility located adjacent to the center as well as the Rock River Generating Station, a natural gas-fired power plant.

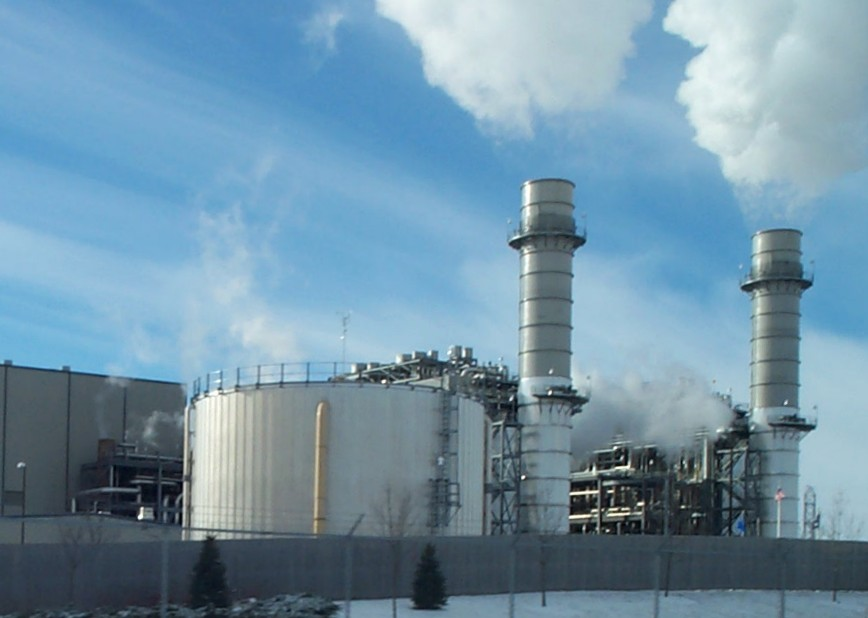
Alliant Energy's Riverside Energy Center

== See also ==
- List of power stations in Wisconsin
