= Ogle County Courthouse =

Local government building in Illinois, US

- U.S. National Register of Historic Places
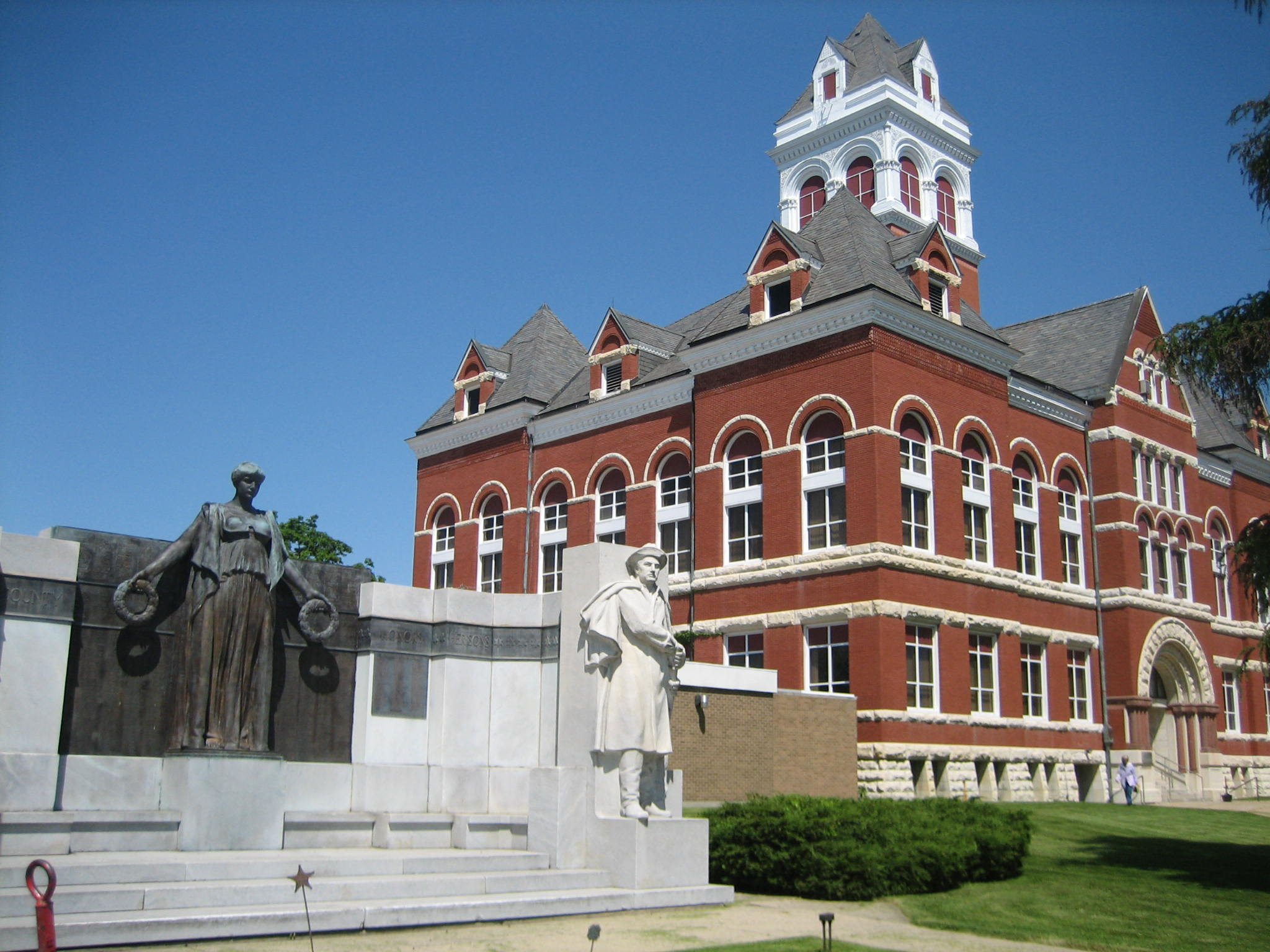
- The Old Ogle County Courthouse in Oregon, Illinois.

- Location within Illinois Location within the United States
- Location: Courthouse Sq., Oregon, Illinois
- Coordinates: 42°00′50.3″N 89°19′59.3″W
- Area: less than one acre
- Built: 1891
- Architect: George O. Garnsey
- Architectural style: Romanesque Revival
- NRHP reference No.: 81000222
- Added to NRHP: September 10, 1981

The Ogle County Courthouse is a National Register of Historic Places listing in the Ogle County, Illinois, county seat of Oregon. The building stands on a public square in the city's downtown commercial district. The current structure was completed in 1891 and was preceded by two other buildings, one of which was destroyed by a group of outlaws. Following the destruction of the courthouse, the county was without a judicial building for a period during the 1840s. The Ogle County Courthouse was designed by Chicago architect George O. Garnsey in the Romanesque Revival style of architecture. The ridged roof is dominated by its wooden cupola which stands out at a distance.

In addition to the courthouse building, the public square contains several outbuildings and sites that are also historic in nature and considered contributing properties to the Oregon Commercial Historic District, including a sculpture by Lorado Taft and a cast-iron fountain. The courthouse joined the Register in 1981 and was included as a contributing property to the historic district in 2006. After initially joining the Register the structure underwent a careful restoration. The courthouse no longer serves as the primary judiciary center for the county; its successor is located directly across the street.

== History ==
Ogle County Courthouse has been the name of three buildings. The current structure on the public square, no longer in use as the judiciary center in Ogle County, was constructed in late 1890 and early 1891 at a cost of US$107,000. The basically square Romanesque Revival structure is topped with a cupola and features a full basement. It was designed by Chicago architect George O. Garnsey.

=== First courthouse ===
The first session of the Ogle County Commissioners' Court took place on January 3, 1837, after the city of Oregon was picked as the county seat. The first courthouse was completed in 1840–1841, but it never saw use. The 1840-41 courthouse was constructed at a cost of $4,000, partially in response to "a gang of villains" harassing citizens. On March 21, 1841, the night before court convened in its new building, the bandits allegedly set the courthouse on fire, completely destroying it. The town, whipped into a fury by horse whipping and thievery and, even murder, later formed a band of "Regulators" to hunt down and bring the bandits to justice. Essentially vigilantes, the group tracked down two residents, "Old Man Driscoll" (possibly Driskell) and his son, William Driscoll, both suspected of the murder. The Driscolls were arrested and brought to Oregon by the Regulators. A trial was organized at a nearby mill. The defendants were provided with counsel and the trial ensued, which residents involved called "fair" at the time.

The swift outcome of the trial resulted in the almost immediate execution of the two men. One Driscoll, led out alone, was shot first. Then the other was led out, shown his dead relative's body and pushed for a confession. The defendant refused to confess, though he reportedly said he had committed other crimes for which he deserved death, and was also shot.

After the lynching, friends and relatives of the Driscolls attempted to strike back at the Regulators. They obtained an indictment against many of the Regulators charging them with murder. The Regulators responded by obtaining their own Bills of Indictment against every person who had stood by and witnessed the lynching. With 125 people under indictment no witnesses could be found, and no jury could be formed, so the judge cleared the charges.

=== Courthouse limbo ===
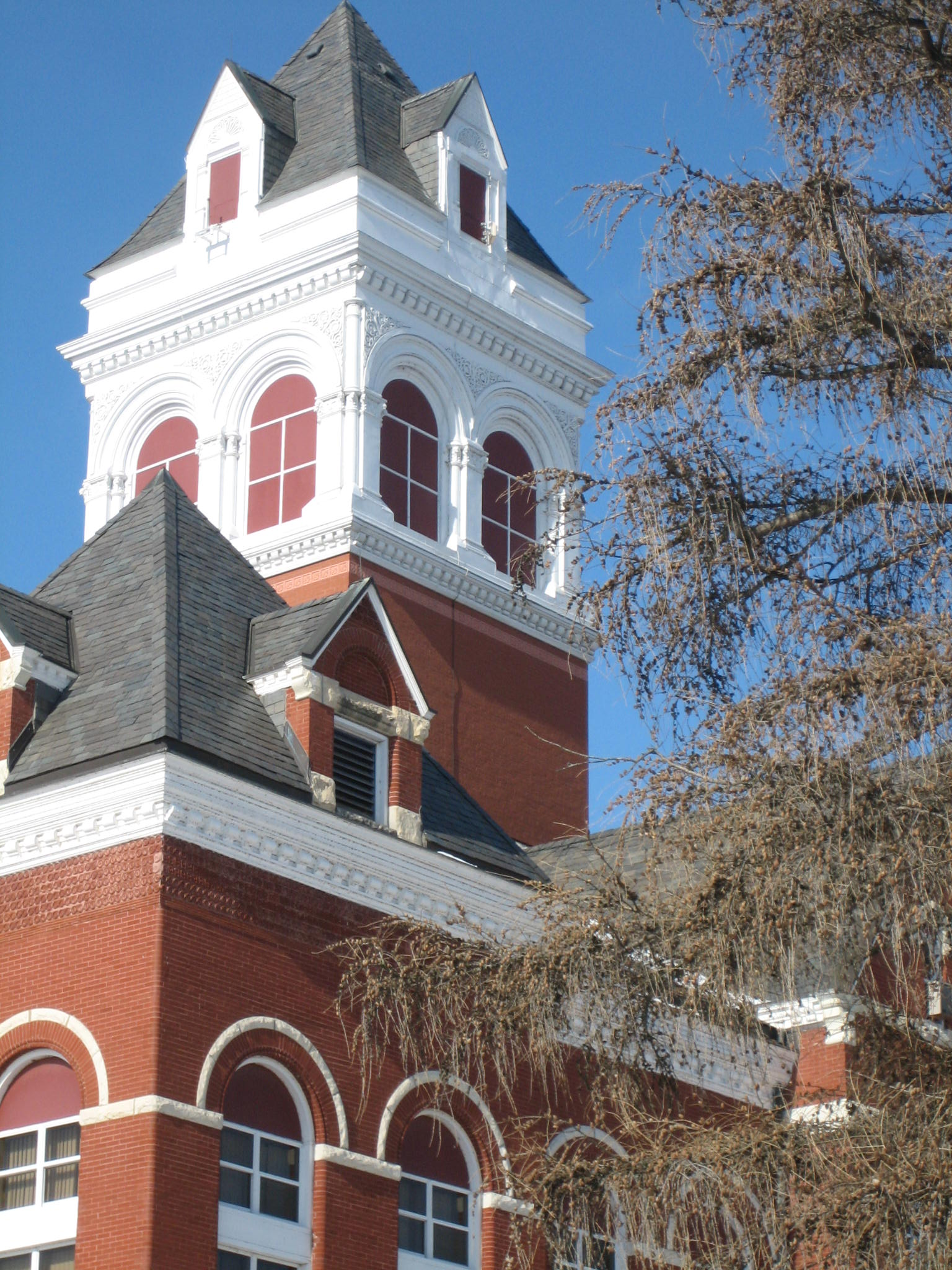
Builders added the striking cupola in 1892, after the courthouse's dedication.

For several years, between the March 1841 arson and 1848, court convened in various private residences. Without a courthouse in Oregon, the county seat, proposals to move the county seat began to circulate. Ogle County communities, Byron, Mount Morris, Grand Detour and Daysville were all in contention for the designation, and, ultimately, the new courthouse. At the deciding meeting the representatives from Daysville removed their town from the running and sided with Oregon. The withdrawal of Daysville gave Oregon a slim majority of votes and it retained its status as county seat of Ogle County.

=== Second courthouse ===
The replacement for the first courthouse, destroyed by arson, was not completed until the summer of 1848. A one-story brick building, the second Ogle County Courthouse was constructed for $3,000. The county used it for several decades but it was soon outgrown as various county offices began to accumulate more and more records and files. The structure exhibited Greek Revival style, common at the time. Some of the 1848 building's architectural elements included, a vent cupola, double-hung sash windows, complete with shutters, a gabled front roof and corniced returns. The new building was used as a multi-purpose public building; besides being the courthouse it served as the meeting hall for the Evangelical Lutheran Congregation of Oregon until 1850. When community leader Henry Mix died in 1867 citizens gathered at the courthouse to mourn. Though the 1848 Ogle County Courthouse was soon found to be "inadequate in every respect" it would be over 40 years before a new facility was built. The idea of a new courthouse was met with staunch opposition and it was not until 1891 that the 1848 building was demolished and the current building erected.

=== Third courthouse ===
The current old courthouse in Ogle County was completed in 1891 and has been in constant use since. It was dedicated on August 20, 1891, and remained the county's primary judicial building until the same date 114 years later, in 2005. On that day Ogle County dedicated its fourth courthouse, across the street from the historic old courthouse. The 1891 courthouse was completed at a cost of slightly more than $100,000. It is constructed of red brick and detailed with Naperville and Ashton limestone in a rock-faced motif. Architect George O. Garnsey, who also designed the Ellwood House in nearby DeKalb County, designed the building in the Romanesque Revival style. The cupola was not added to the roof until 1892.

During its early years, the courthouse was a popular community meeting place; the courthouse lawn was a common setting for community events and gatherings. Today, events no longer regularly take place on the courthouse lawn, but some festivals still occur at the location. After being listed on the National Register of Historic Places in 1981 a series of renovations began on the building, in order to, "preserve its historical and architectural integrity." Inside the courthouse, each office and courtroom was renovated, the exterior of the structure was refurbished and restored as well. The work was completed in 1983 and the building opened for public tours in 1984.

== Architecture ==
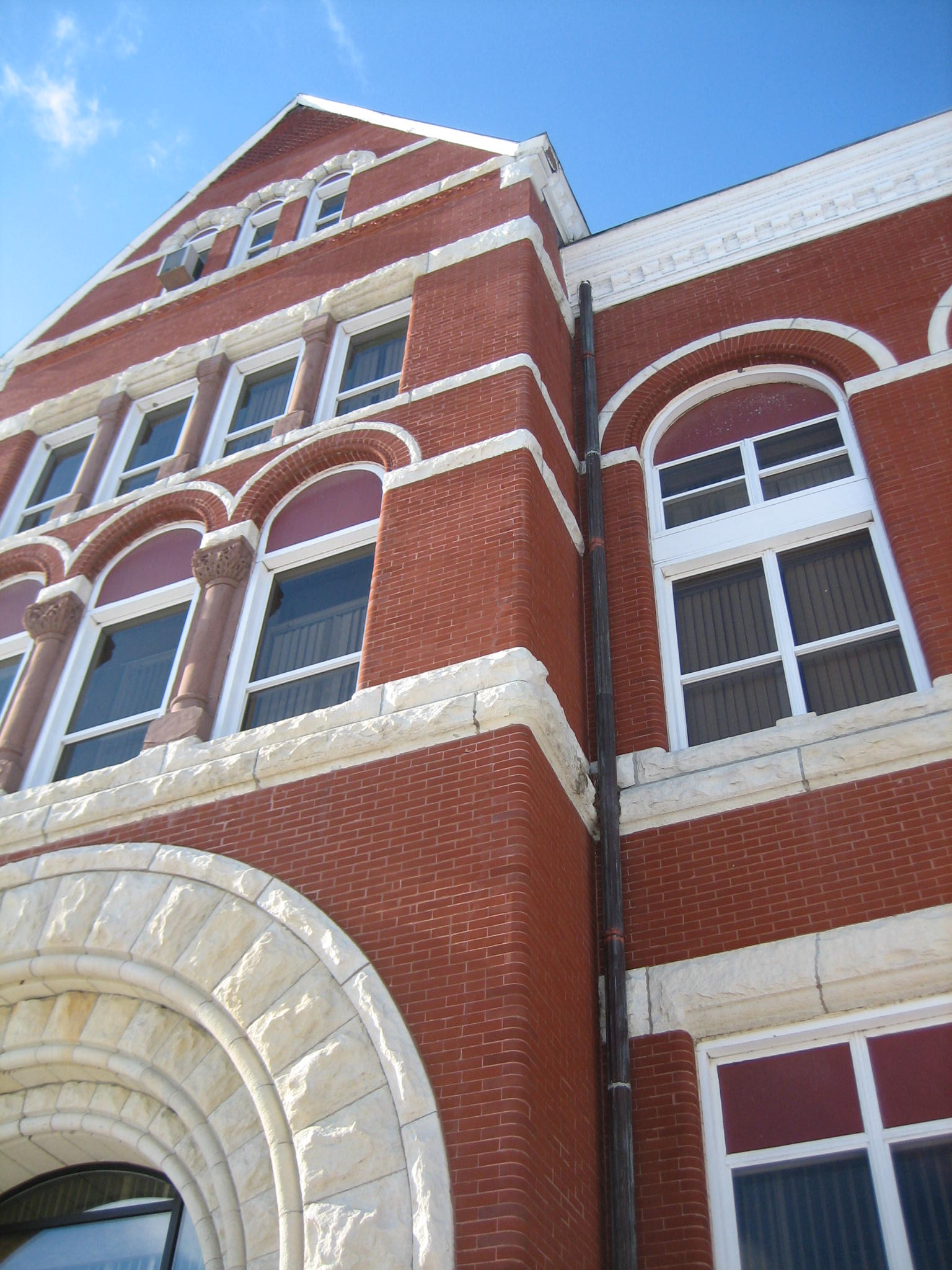
The facade of the building is constructed of red brick, accented with limestone detailing.

This example of Romanesque Revival architecture was designed by George O. Garnsey, a Chicago architect well known in northern Illinois. An impressive structure, the courthouse is designed on a monumental scale.

=== Exterior ===
The building is constructed of red pressed brick, detailed with locally quarried limestone, and reinforced with steel girders. The building's primary contractor was C.A. Moses. The red brick facade is detailed with significant amounts of limestone, including in its continuous lintels and sills. The entrances are covered with large round arches. The full basement is hinted at by the building's prominent foundation and water table. The window lintels, and sills, as well as the arches and stairs are trimmed with limestone.

The roof is sharply angled toward its center, where a wooden cupola tops the building. It was completed after the building, in 1892. At each of the square shaped building's four corners are dormers, which serve to break up the monotony of the otherwise ridged roof. The dormers resemble the cupola, in that they are dormered as well as multi-gabled. The roof has had routine maintenance performed as required. The building's dominant feature, its cupola, sits on an oversized brick base with a terra cotta belt around its base top. It features blocked openings with multiple arches, double round arches, Corinthian pilasters, and organic corner detailing.

The courthouse is elaborately windowed. Some windows, mostly on the first floor are straight topped. On the second floor most of the windows are topped with limestone arches. The original, wood-framed windows were replaced in 1972. The building's two main entrances feature stone arches over recessed doors; eleven step stairways lead to both doors. New doors were installed in both entrances in 1971.

=== Interior ===
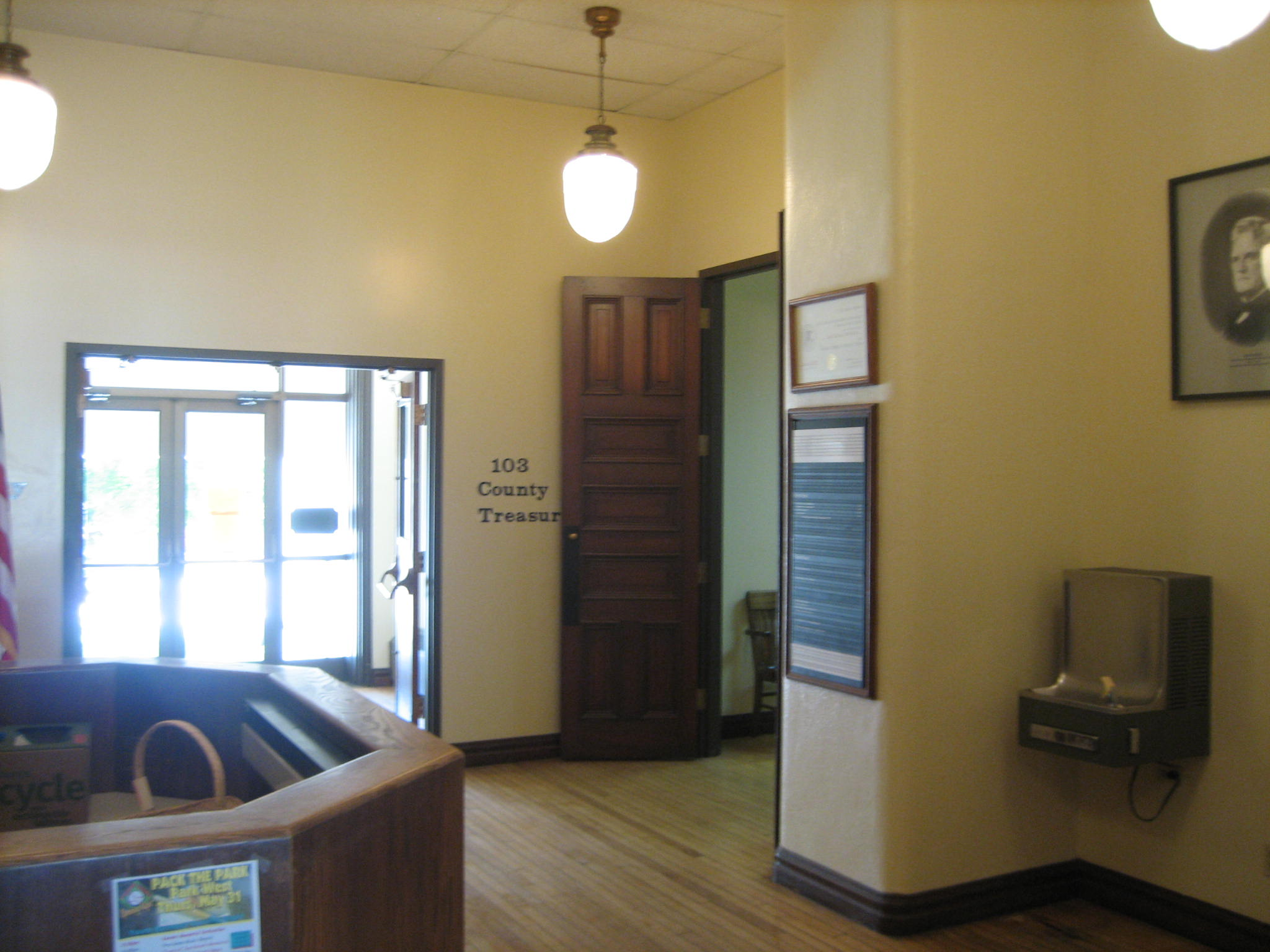
The interior, first-floor lobby of the courthouse building.

The remaining original woodwork, sills, door frames, and interior doors, are all solid oak. The interior walls are 12 inches thick and, either painted or covered with paneling. An open, double staircase leads from the first floor to the second and third floors and the center of the building houses an elevator which moves from the basement to the third floor. The interior floors are all white pine wood, though some of the floors have now been carpeted. First floor ceilings are 15 feet high, with doors at a height of 12 feet. The second floor features the courtrooms, which, through the 1980s remodel, had the ceilings lowered to 10 feet. The interior renovation was completed at a cost of US$1.5 million.

== Other features ==
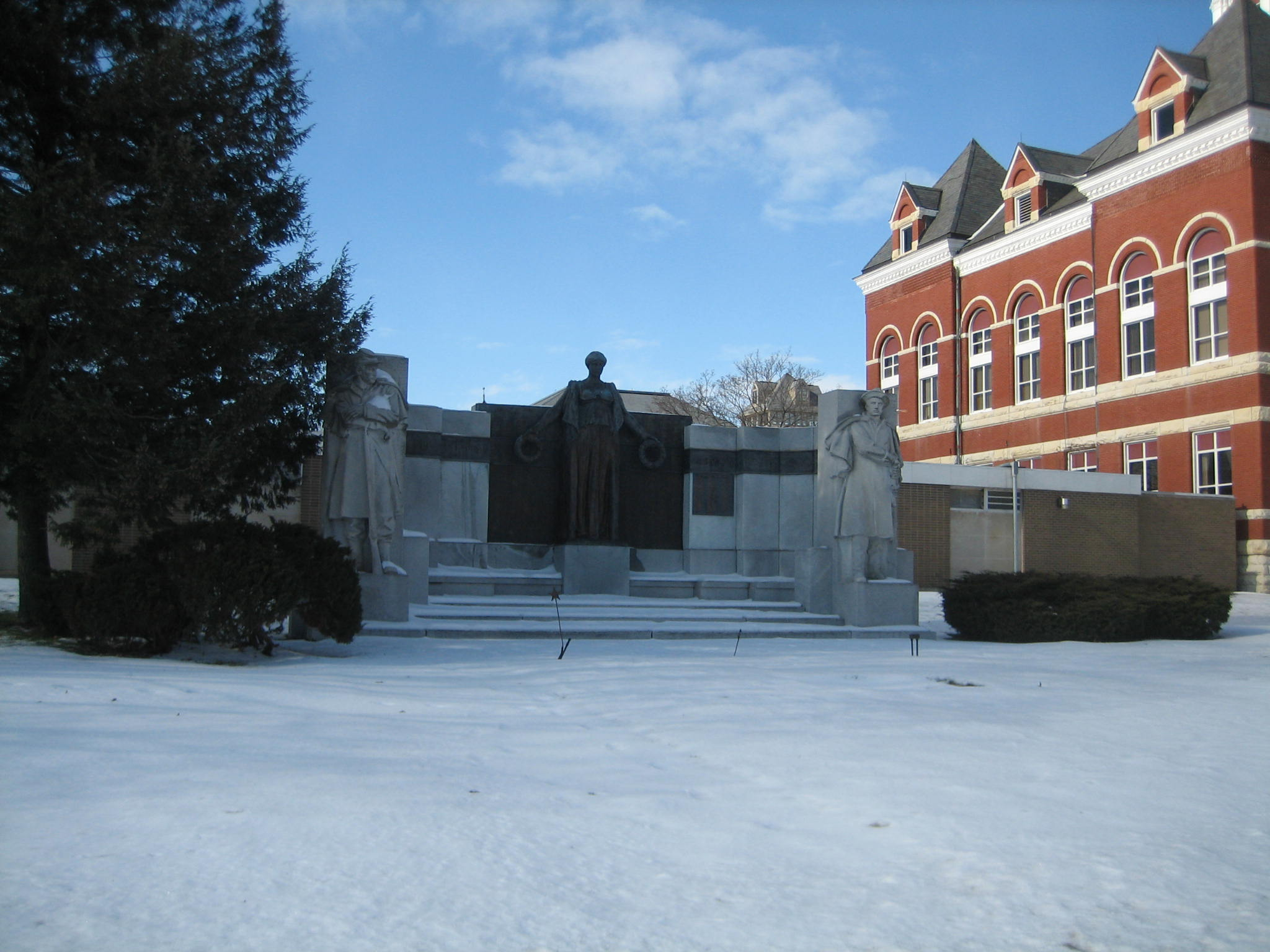
Lorado Taft's The Soldiers' Monument.

The public square where the Ogle County Courthouse stands is in the heart of the Oregon Commercial Historic District. Besides the courthouse, there are five other important sites on the public square, all of which are considered contributing properties to the historic district. The sites include cannons, war memorials, and a cast-iron fountain. Iron Mike, the 1896 cast-iron fountain, is on the south side of the 400 Block of Washington Street in the Oregon Commercial Historic District. The multi-tier fountain is set into a matte green concrete base, and is four feet tall and three feet wide, at its widest point. Its lowest tier is adorned with the words "Illinois Humane Society."

=== Civil War cannons ===
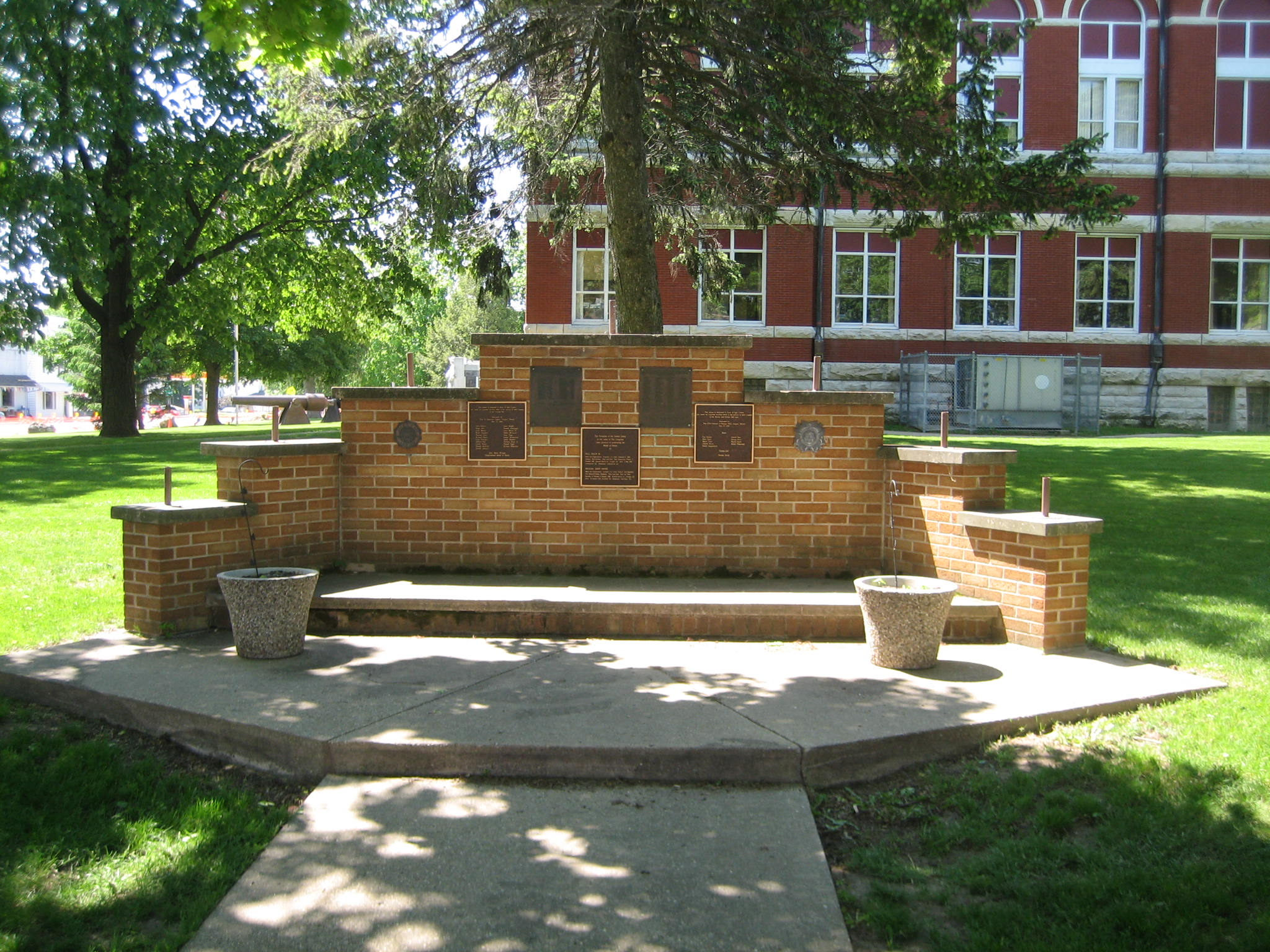
The War Memorial on the courthouse square, a contributing property to the Oregon Commercial Historic District.

The public square also features two surplus Civil War era cannons. The two cannons "guard" the eastern entrance to the Ogle County Courthouse. Both cannons were put in place sometime between 1898 and 1900. The Columbiad Cannon (the southernmost cannon) was cast in 1846 in Boston, Massachusetts. The northernmost cannon, the Parrot Cannon, was cast in 1864.

=== The Soldiers' Monument ===
The Soldiers' Monument sits on the southeast corner of the public square. The monument was designed by sculptor Lorado Taft in 1911 and Chicago architects Allen Bartlit Pond and Irving Kane Pond designed the structure that encompasses Taft's sculptures. The installation was dedicated in 1916. The monument is adorned with plaques honoring Ogle County's war dead from the American Civil War, Mexican War, War of 1812 and World War I, the last of which was added later.

=== War memorial ===
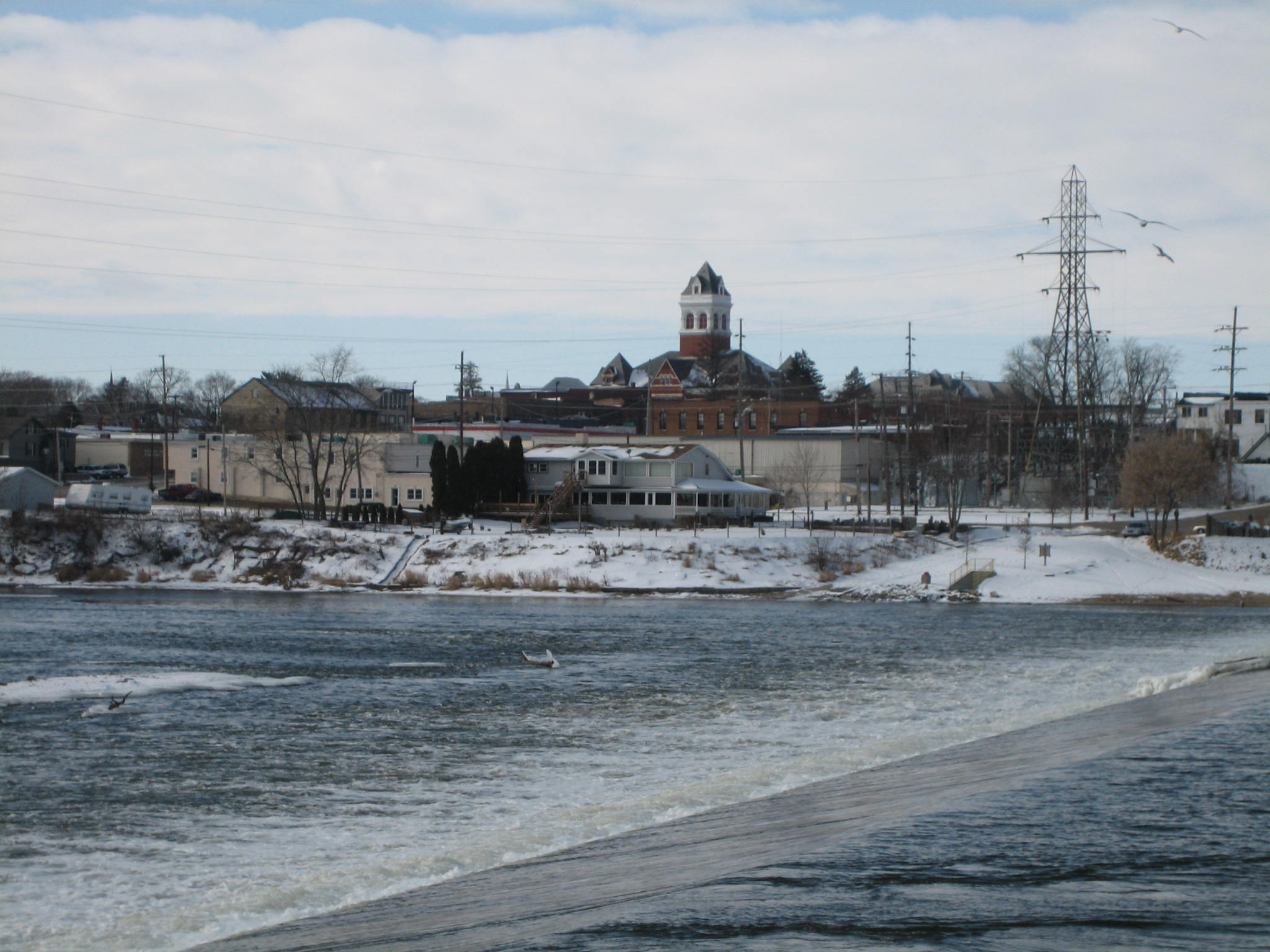
The Ogle County Courthouse is easily visible from a distance.

On the north side of the public square is a terraced concrete memorial dedicated to Ogle County veterans of wars other than those included on The Soldiers' Monument. Dedicated on June 29, 1950, the War Memorial is adorned with plaques representing five American wars, World War I, World War II, the Korean War, the Vietnam War and the Persian Gulf War. The plaques were added from 1951 to 1991. The memorial features four brick tiers topped with concrete caps, each cap holds a flagpole base.

== Significance ==
The Ogle County Courthouse was added to National Register of Historic Places on September 10, 1981. On August 16, 2006, its historic importance was reasserted when it was included as a contributing property in the Oregon Commercial Historic District's listing on the National Register. On its original National Register nomination form the building was cited as significant in the areas of "architecture" and "politics and government." The courthouse has been called a "prized landmark," and a site "that holds a special place of honor" in the city of Oregon. Three of the features on and around the courthouse grounds, Iron Mike, the War Memorial, and The Soldiers' Monument, all greatly contribute to the sense of time and place that the Oregon Commercial Historic District conveys.

== See also ==
- List of Registered Historic Places in Illinois
