= T. Goings Building =

- U.S. Historic district – Contributing property
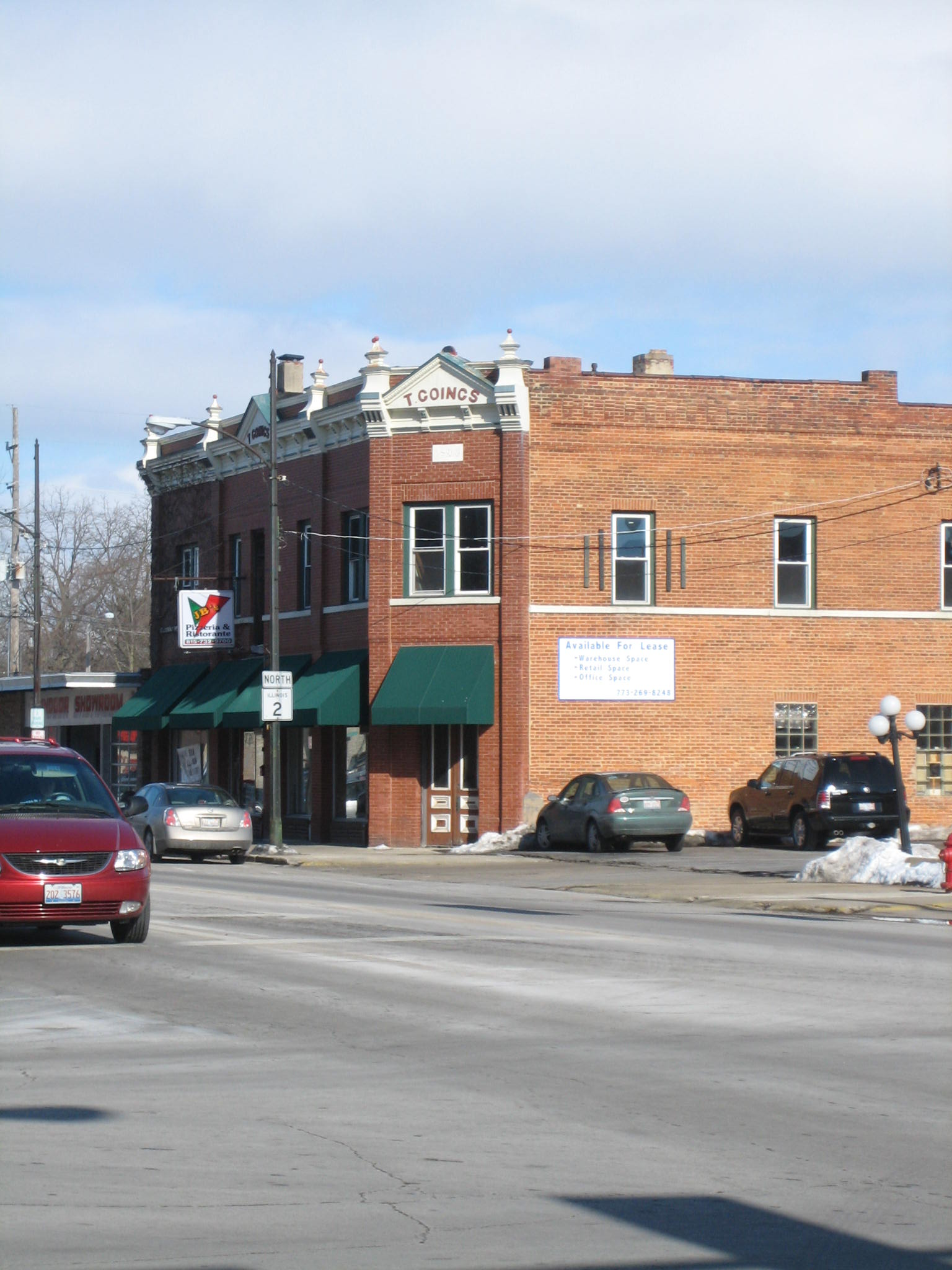
- The T. Goings Building was once exposed to an alley between it and the now demolished Sinnissippi Hotel.
- Location: Oregon, Ogle County, Illinois
- Coordinates: 42°00′54.52″N 89°19′56.1″W
- Built: 1895
- Architectural style: Italianate
- Part of: Oregon Commercial Historic District (ID06000713)
- Designated CP: August 16, 2006

The T. Goings Building is a late 19th-century commercial building within the boundaries of the Oregon Commercial Historic District in Oregon, Illinois, U.S.A. The building is listed as a contributing structure to the overall integrity of the historic district, which was added to the National Register of Historic Places in 2006. The building, found on Oregon's North Fourth Street, is an 1895 example of commercial Italianate style, albeit more muted than the other Italianate buildings in the district.

== History ==
The T. Goings building was constructed in 1895 and is an example of late Italianate architecture.

== Architecture ==
As a late example of Italianate the T. Goings Building lacks the elaborate window detailings of the district's other Italianate structures. Despite this, the building does have elaborate cornices. The wood cornices have brackets set atop brick piers, with finials atop. They are constructed of clapboard with the brackets and organic appliques in between the piers. The storefronts are historic and include some original doors and cast-iron pilasters.
