= Unity Building =

- U.S. Historic district – Contributing property
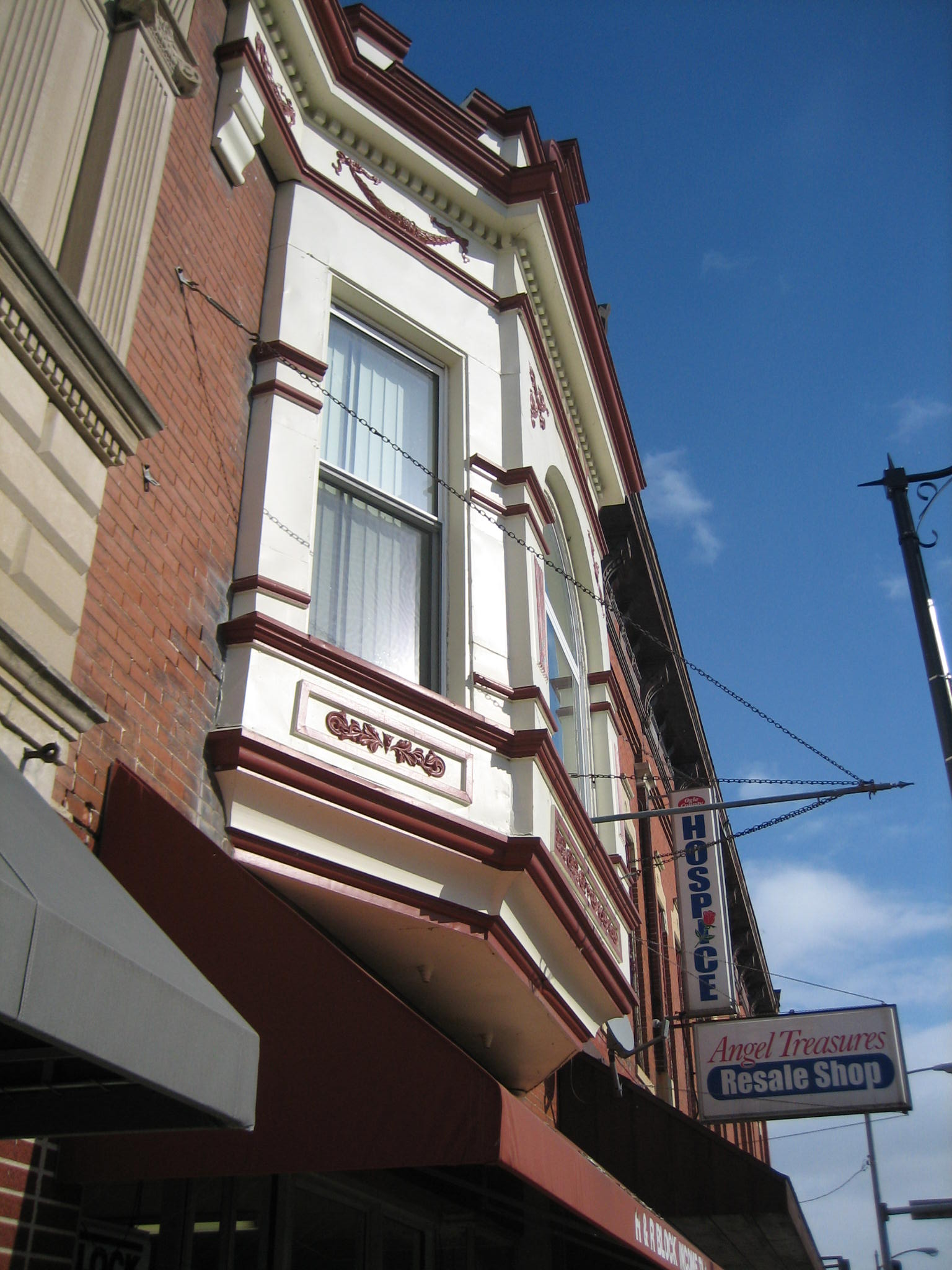

- Location within Illinois Location within the United States
- Location: Oregon, Ogle County, Illinois
- Coordinates: 42°00′53.1″N 89°19′59.0″W
- Built: 1900
- Architectural style: Italianate, Queen Anne
- Part of: Oregon Commercial Historic District (ID06000713)
- Added to NRHP: August 16, 2006 as part of the Oregon Commercial Historic District.

The Unity Building, in Oregon, Illinois, is a historic building in that city's Oregon Commercial Historic District. As part of the district the Oregon Unity Building has been listed on the National Register of Historic Places, along with the rest of the district, since August 2006.
