= Oregon State Savings Bank Building =

- U.S. Historic district – Contributing property
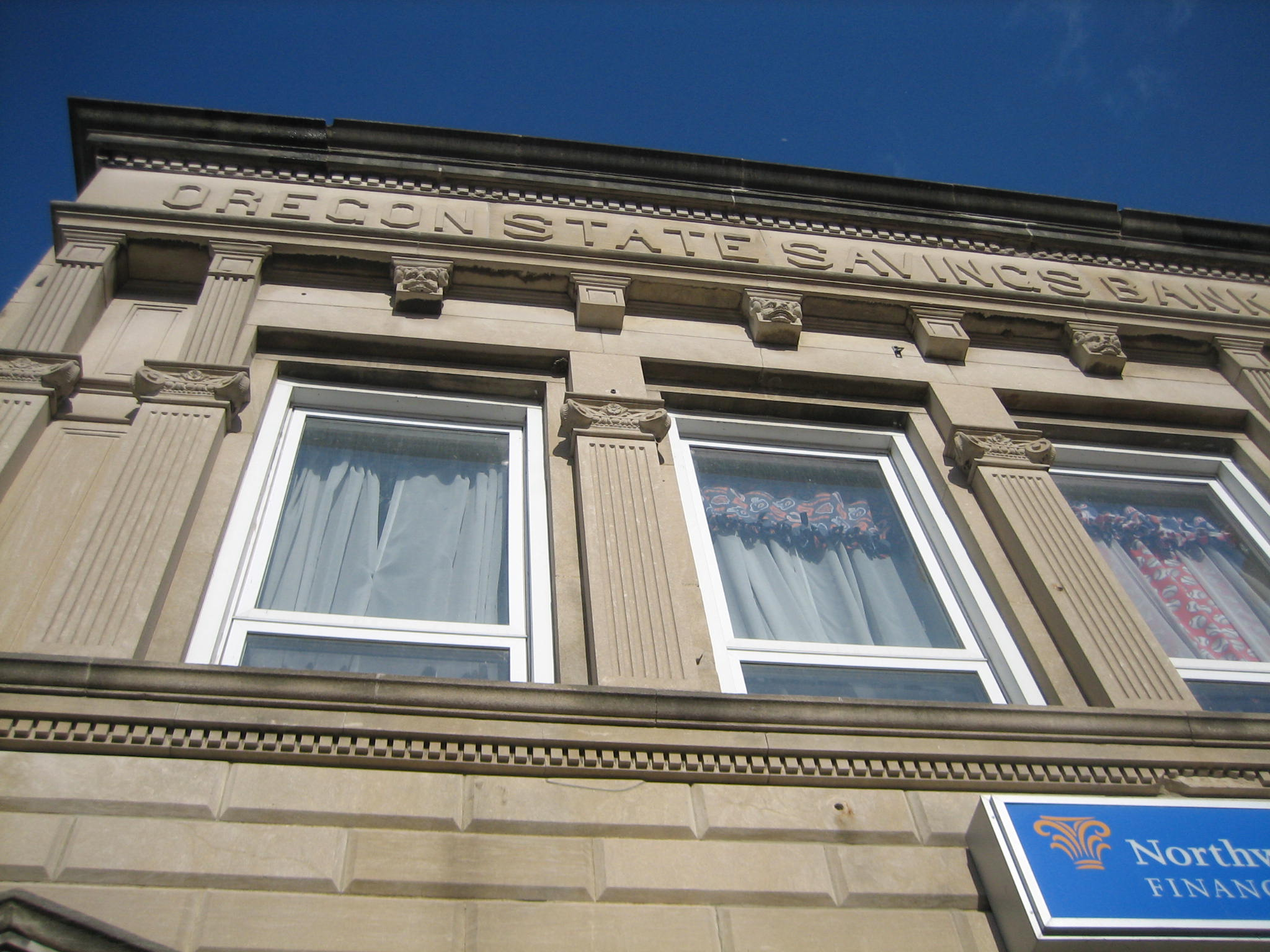
- Location: Oregon, Ogle County, Illinois, USA
- Coordinates: 42°00′53.13″N 89°19′59.65″W
- Built: 1905
- Architectural style: Classical Revival
- Part of: Oregon Commercial Historic District (ID06000713)

The Oregon State Savings Bank Building is an historic building in the Ogle County, Illinois city of Oregon. Its location is within the boundaries of the Oregon Commercial Historic District. The historic district was designated and added to the National Register of Historic Places in August 2006.
