= 125 S. Fourth St. =

- U.S. Historic district – Contributing property
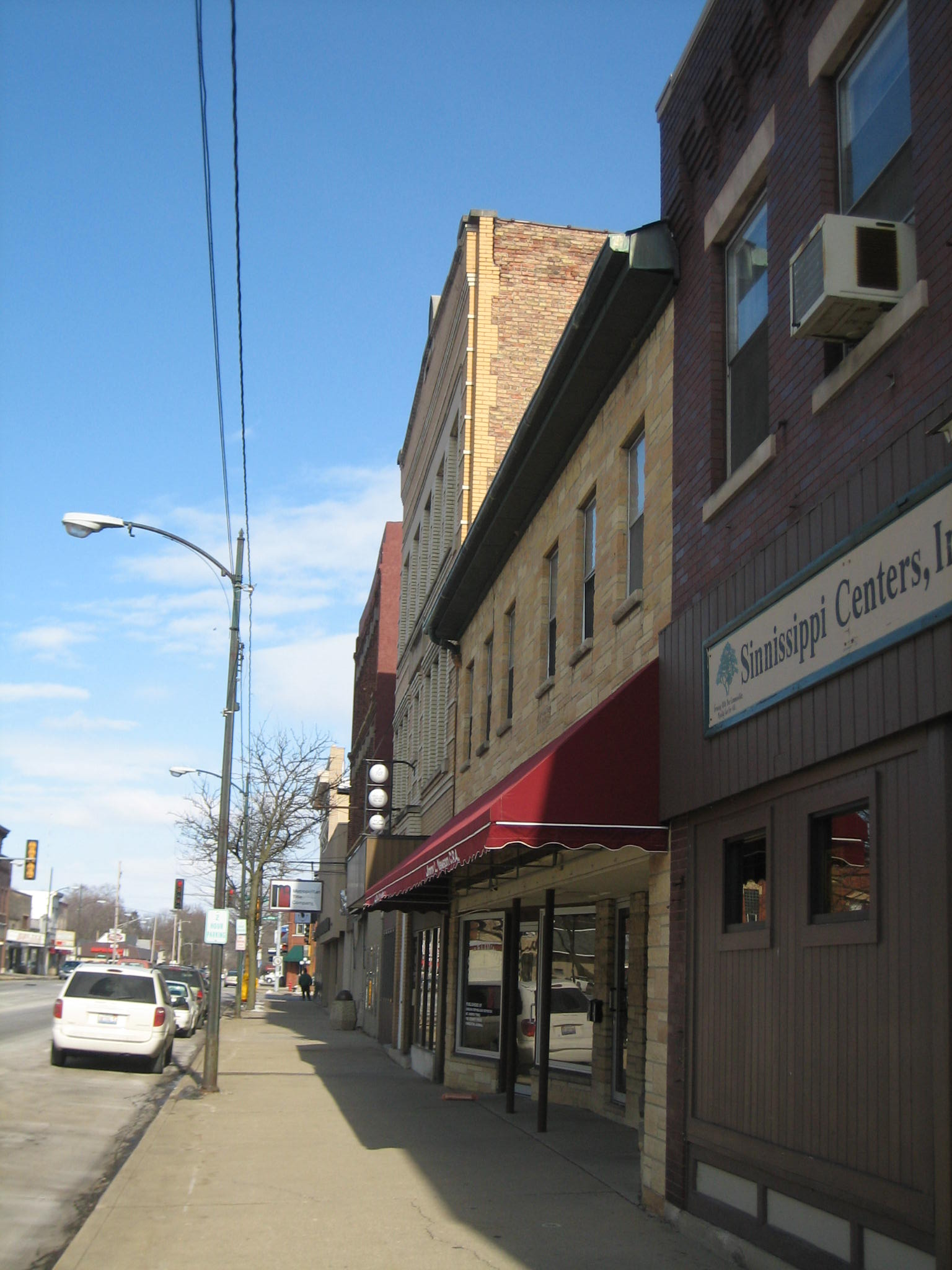
- 125 S. Fourth St. is the burgundy brick building in the right foreground.
- Location: Oregon, Ogle County, Illinois, USA
- Coordinates: 42°00′49.60″N 89°19′56.49″W
- Built: 1907
- Part of: Oregon Commercial Historic District (ID06000713)
- Added to NRHP: August 16, 2006

125 S. Fourth St. is the address of an unnamed historic building in the Ogle County, Illinois city of Oregon. The building is part of the Oregon Commercial Historic District and as such is part of the National Register of Historic Places. The district and its contributing properties were added to the Register in August 2006. The building has been altered somewhat from its original appearance including wood siding added to the first floor level and the addition of signage. It stands near the rest of the 100 Block of South Fourth Street, which includes other historic buildings at 127 S. Fourth St., 121-123 S. Fourth St., to which 125 is adjacent and the Masonic Temple Lodge No. 420.
