= Rock River Generating Station =

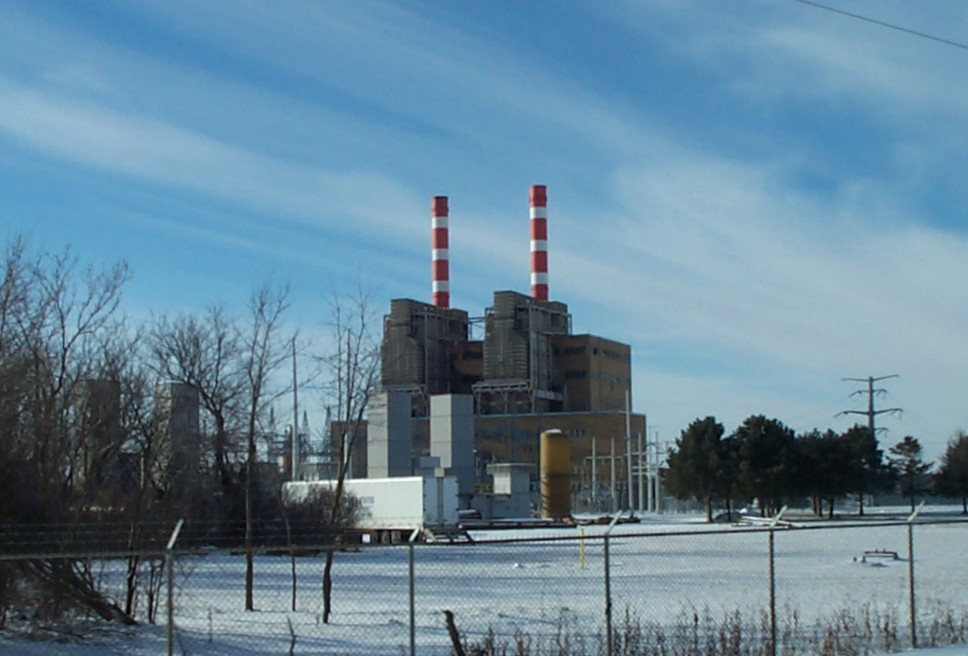
- Country: United States
- Location: Town of Beloit, Wisconsin
- Coordinates: 42°34′55″N 89°1′39″W
- Status: Demolition in progress, June 2016
- Commission date: Unit 1 1952; Unit 2 1953
- Decommission date: June 2020
- Owners: Wisconsin Power and Light

Thermal power station
- Primary fuel: Natural gas, originally coal
- Turbine technology: Steam turbine
- Cooling source: Rock River

Power generation
- Units operational: 2
- Nameplate capacity: 318.9 MW

External links
- Commons: Related media on Commons

Rock River Generating Station was an electrical power station located north of Beloit, Wisconsin in the town of Beloit at 827 (West Beloit Rock) W. B. R. Townline Road on the west bank of the Rock River. The facility was owned and operated by Wisconsin Power and Light, a wholly owned subsidiary of Alliant Energy.

== History ==
The facility opened in the early 1950s and consists of two 280 megawatts (970 million British thermal units per hour) Babcock & Wilcox cyclone boilers each with one steam turbine. Originally designed to burn Illinois Basin bituminous coal supplied by rail car or barge, the site switched to natural gas or lower sulfur Powder River Basin coal. Additionally, a 30 MW combustion turbine was added in 1967 and two 50 MW combustion turbines were added between 1972 and 1977. As of 2000, the boilers were capable of operating on a variety of fuel sources, including natural gas, Powder River Basin coal, #2 fuel oil and tire-derived fuel. Coal has not been burned at the site since 2007 because the facility closed the landfill it had used for fly ash. Coal burning boilers, Unit 1 and 2, were officially retired April 1, 2010. Electricity was generated via steam turbines and process water was taken from the Rock River.

On June 25, 2016, a worker was killed as the plant was being demolished. Demolition was expected to be completed by the end of 2016.

== Adjacent facilities ==
An Alliant maintenance facility, Southern Area, and Riverside Energy Center, a 603 MW combined cycle natural gas facility, formerly owned by Calpine, are located adjacent to the station.

A second combined cycle natural gas plant was approved for construction March 31, 2016 at Riverside Energy Center, just west of the Rock River Generating station.

== Gallery ==
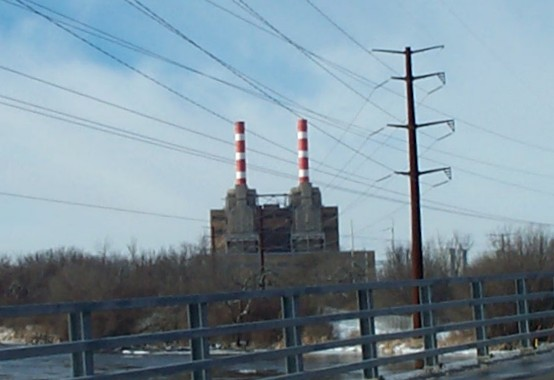

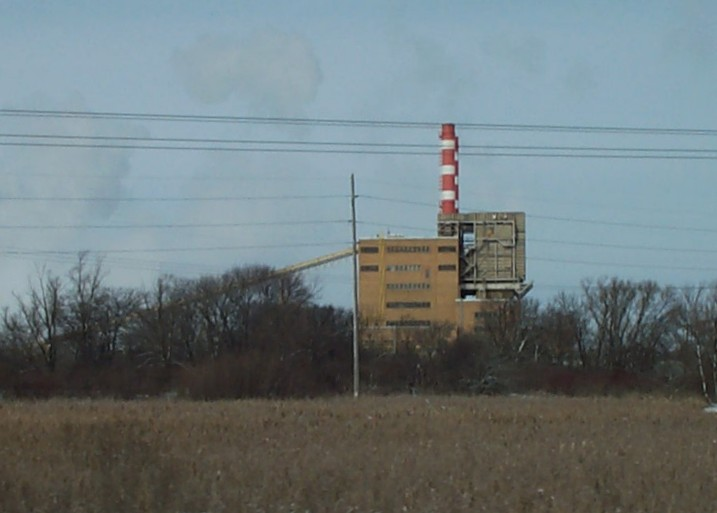

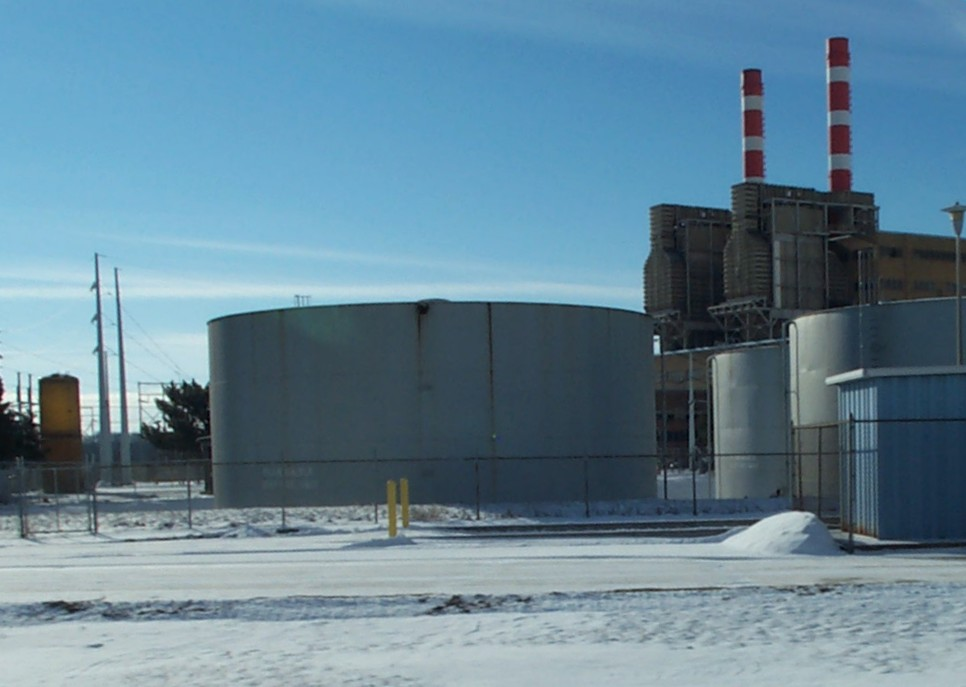

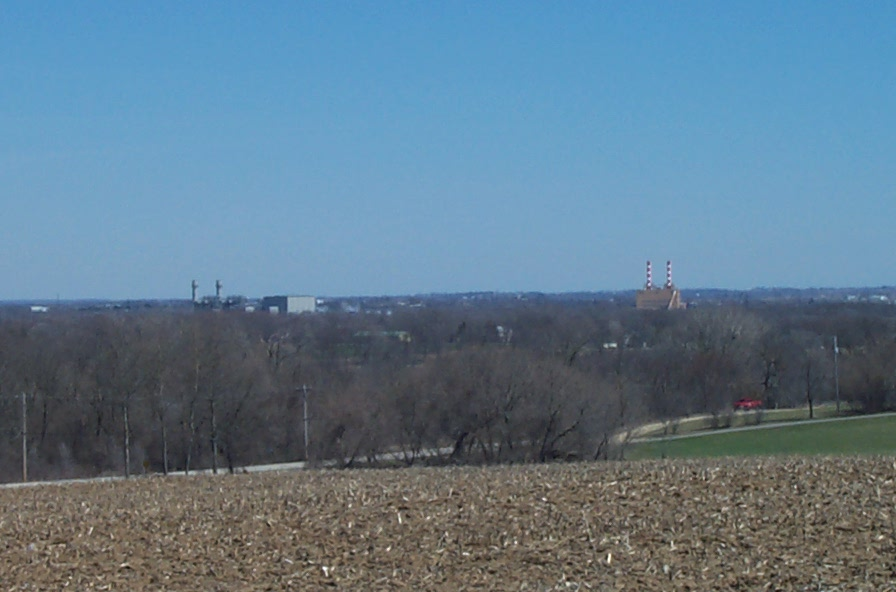
Wide angle view from south west of the site. Riverside Energy Center is adjacent to the west.

== See also ==
- List of power stations in Wisconsin
