= 302 Washington St. =

- U.S. Historic district – Contributing property
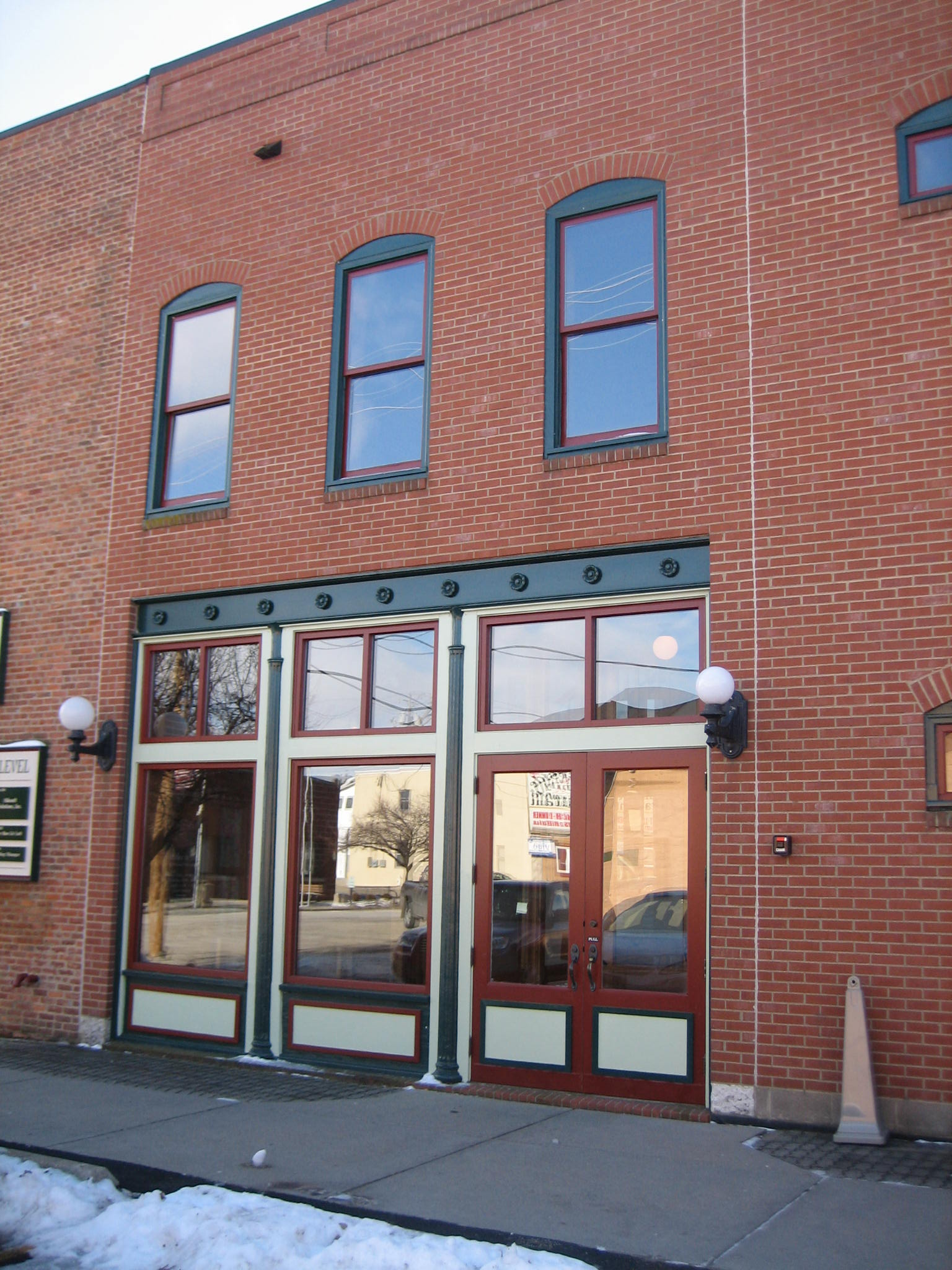
- The rear facade of 300 Washington is notable for its cast-iron storefront.
- Location: Oregon, Ogle County, Illinois, USA
- Coordinates: 42°00′51.92″N 89°19′53.84″W
- Built: c. 1868
- Architectural style: Italianate
- Part of: Oregon Commercial Historic District (ID06000713)
- Added to NRHP: August 16, 2006

The building at 302 Washington St. in Oregon, Illinois is part of trio of historic Italianate commercial buildings within the boundaries of the Oregon Commercial Historic District from 300 to 306 Washington. The structure acts mostly as a hallway area between the buildings at 300 Washington St. and the F.G. Jones Block. The interior and exterior have been significantly restored on all three buildings. As part of the Commercial Historic District 300 Washington Street was added to the National Register of Historic Places in August 2006.

== Architecture ==
This two-story red brick building is detailed with limestone and sits adjacent to the F.G. Jones Block, at 304-306 Washington, and the historic building at 300 Washington. A canvas awning stretches the entire front facade, continuing along to the other two buildings connected to 302. The second-story front exterior features three windows and is heavily Italianate in its design. All three window bays are elaborately arched, the central one being taller than the two flanking bays. The hoodmolds are stone round arches with decorative keystone and impost blocks, with those on the central window being the more ornate of the three. The base of the building's parapet is corbelled in the same red brick that makes up the rest of the exterior. At the building's frieze are seven recessed panels with small corbelled areas of brick between.

Particularly notable is the building's rear facade. The uniform brick surface stretches evenly over all three of the structures, 302, 300 and the Jones Block. The rear facade of 302, however, features a cast-iron storefront with bulkhead panels and two storefront sash double doors. Cast-iron columns separate the storefront sash from the beams with rosettes.

== History ==
The building's east end was used as a theater for the showing of films in the early part of the 20th century. The building at 302 Washington became the theater after the operation at a local saloon moved there.
