= Rocky River (Victoria) =

River in Victoria, Australia

Rocky
- Mouth of the Rocky River in Victoria

Location
- Country: Australia
- State: Victoria
- Region: South East Corner (IBRA), East Gippsland
- Local government area: Shire of East Gippsland

Physical characteristics
- Source: Mount Murrungowar
  - location: near Murrungowar
  - elevation: 470 m (1,540 ft)
- Mouth: confluence with the Jack River
  - location: Brodribb Flora Reserve
  - coordinates: 37°37′38″S 148°36′31″E
  - elevation: 41 m (135 ft)
- Length: 15 km (9.3 mi)

Basin features
- River system: Snowy River catchment

The Rocky River is a perennial river of the Snowy River catchment, in the East Gippsland region of the Australian state of Victoria.

== Course and features ==
The Rocky River rises below Mount Murrungowar in a state forestry area west of the locality of Murrungowar, and flows generally southwest before reaching its confluence with the Jack River, within the Brodribb Flora Reserve in the Shire of East Gippsland. The river descends 430 metres (1,410 ft) over its 15-kilometre (9.3 mi) course.

The catchment area of the river is administered by the East Gippsland Catchment Management Authority.

== See also ==
- List of rivers of Australia
