= Rock River Hotel =

- U.S. Historic district – Contributing property
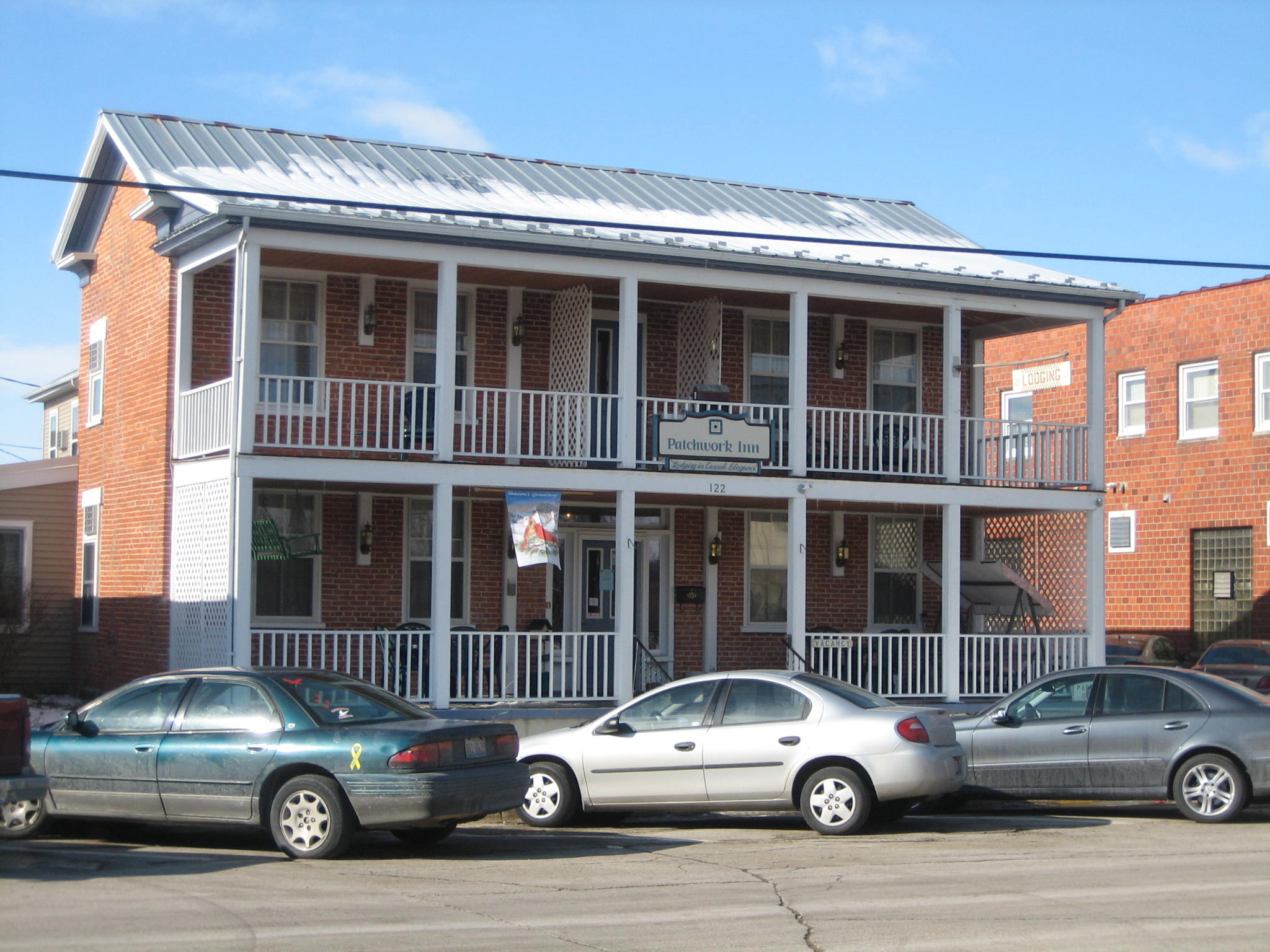
- Location: Oregon, Ogle County, Illinois
- Coordinates: 42°00′55.2″N 89°19′53.3″W
- Area: Oregon Commercial Historic District
- Built: c. 1860
- Architectural style: I-house, Greek Revival
- Website: http://www.patchworkinn.com
- Part of: Oregon Commercial Historic District (ID06000713)
- Added to NRHP: August 16, 2006

The historic Rock River Hotel, later the Blackhawk Hotel and currently known as the Patchwork Inn bed and breakfast, is a two-story I-house brick building in the Ogle County, Illinois city of Oregon. The Hotel is within the Oregon Commercial Historic District. The district and its contributing properties were added to the National Register of Historic Places in August 2006. Today it operates as a bed and breakfast but in its earliest years it was a private residence, by 1899 it had been converted for use as a hotel.
