= Iron Mike (fountain) =

- U.S. Historic district – Contributing property
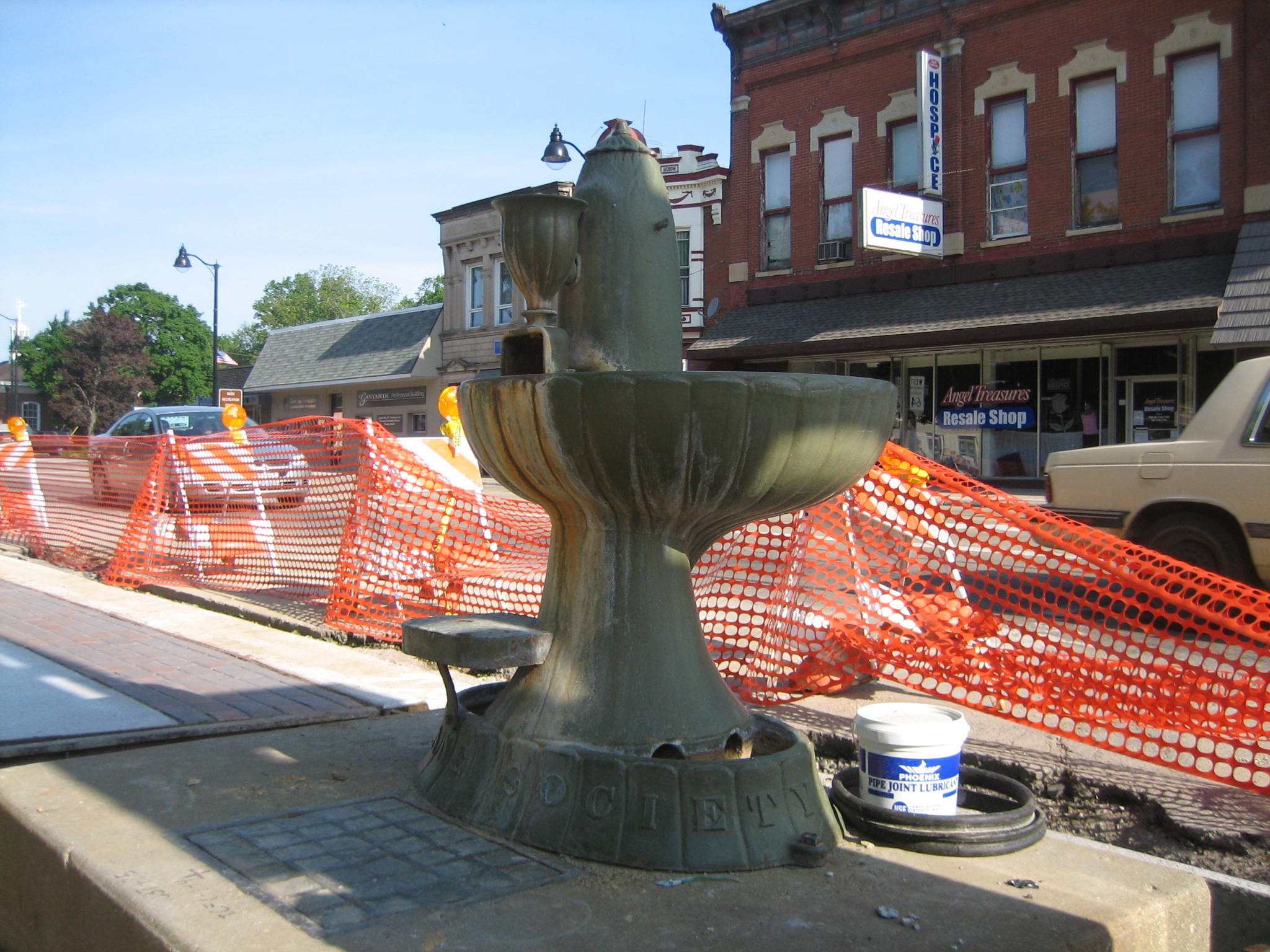
- Location: Oregon, Ogle County, Illinois, USA
- Coordinates: 42°00′52.28″N 89°19′58.25″W
- Area: Oregon Commercial Historic District
- Built: 1896
- Part of: Oregon Commercial Historic District (ID06000713)
- Added to NRHP: August 16, 2006

Iron Mike is an 1896 cast-iron fountain in the 400 Block of Washington Street in the city of Oregon, Illinois. It is located at the site of the Ogle County Courthouse, at the intersection of Illinois Route 2 and Route 64. Iron Mike is four feet tall and three feet wide, at its widest point. The fountain's lowest tier is a pool for pets and reads "Illinois Humane Society." There is a step for children on the south side of the fountain and on the north, street, side, the largest middle tier was made to be accessible to horses. On the rear side of the horse basin is a "bubbler" for adults, it is also reachable by children via the iron step. The multi-tier fountain was originally set into a concrete base which was immediately adjacent to the curb of Route 64. In 2021 Iron Mike was relocated 15 feet away from the road unto the property of the Ogle County Courthouse.
