= Oregon Commercial Historic District =

Historic district in Illinois, United States

- U.S. National Register of Historic Places
- U.S. Historic district
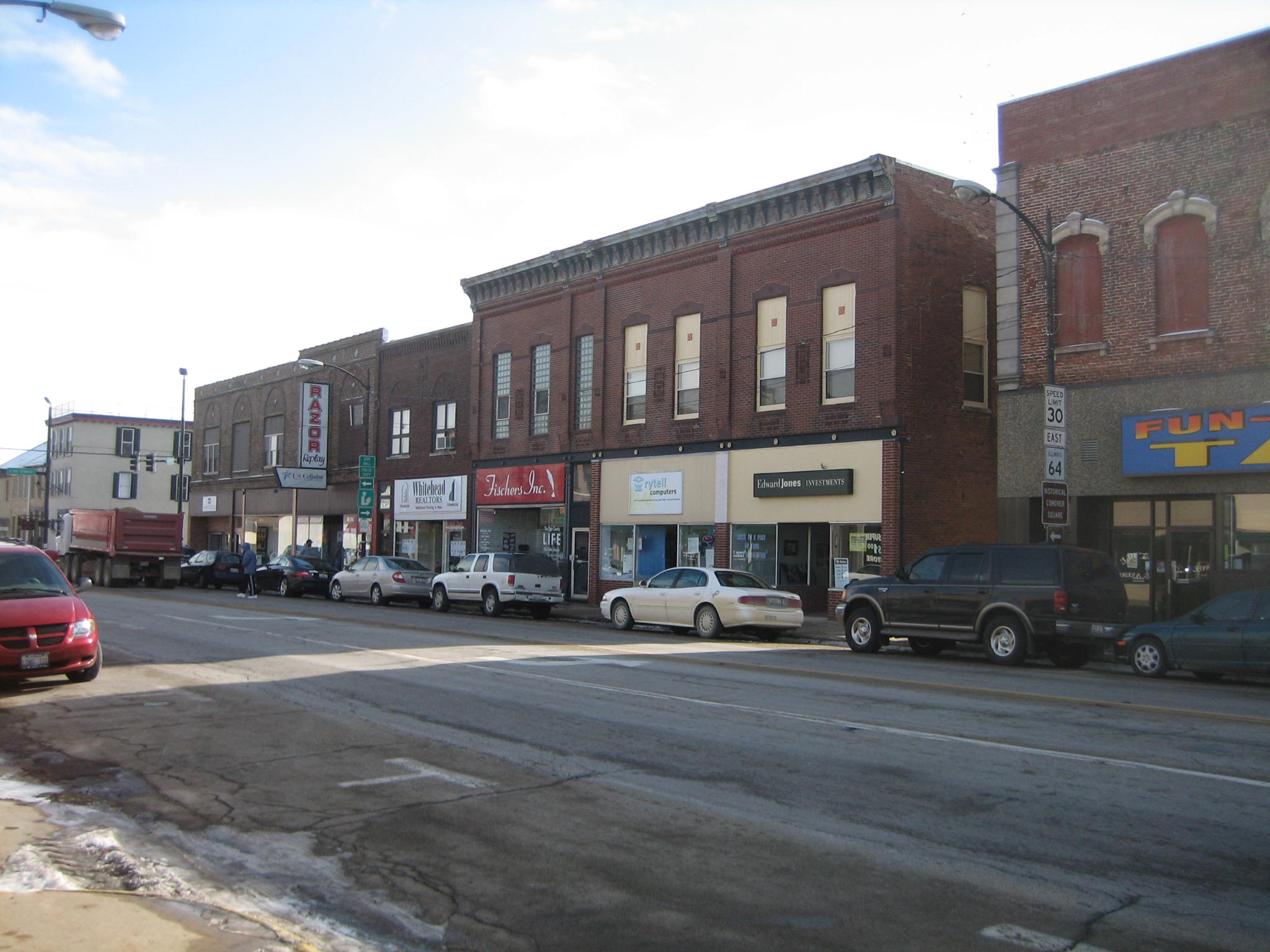
- Historic buildings in the 300 Block of Washington Street, Oregon, Illinois.

- Location within Illinois Location within the United States
- Location: Roughly bounded by Jefferson, Franklin, 5th and 3rd Sts., Oregon, Illinois
- Coordinates: 42°00′52.6″N 89°19′56.7″W
- Area: 0 acres (0 ha)
- Built: Various
- Architect: Pond & Pond; Taft, Lorado
- Architectural style: Italianate, Queen Anne, Romanesque Revival, Classical Revival, Art Deco, Arts and Crafts, Art Nouveau, Art Moderne, Colonial Revival
- NRHP reference No.: 06000713
- Added to NRHP: August 16, 2006

The Oregon Commercial Historic District is a historic district in Oregon, Illinois, that has been listed on the National Register of Historic Places since 2006. The district is roughly bordered by Jefferson, Franklin, 5th and 3rd Streets in Oregon. It is one of six Oregon sites listed on the National Register and one of three to be so listed since the turn of the 21st century. The other two are the Oregon Public Library, listed in 2003, and the Chana School, listed in 2005.

== Establishment history ==
The Oregon Commercial Historic District was listed on the National Register of Historic Places on August 16, 2006. The National Register of Historic Places Registration form was dated July 12, 2006 and was completed by the Illinois Historic Preservation Agency.

== Boundaries ==
The boundaries for the district are roughly encompassed by Jefferson Street on the south, Franklin Street on the north, and 3rd and 5th Street on the east and west. The grounds cover 30 acres (120,000 m^{2}) and include 62 buildings and objects. Of those, 51 are contributing properties, 44 buildings, two structures and five objects. Another eleven buildings are considered non-contributing to the overall general historical character of the historic district.

== Architecture ==
The 44 buildings, five objects and two structures that make up the contributing properties of the historic district represent a wide range of architectural styles and uses. Italianate, Romanesque Revival, Queen Anne, Art Nouveau, Art Deco and the Arts and Crafts Movement, and other styles and movements, have all had their influences on the collection of mostly low level commercial architecture in the district.

== Structures ==
Of the numerous buildings two of them are listed individually on the National Register of Historic Places. They are the Arts and Crafts Oregon Public Library and the Romanesque Revival Ogle County Courthouse. The buildings are a mix of commercial, government and private residence usage, mostly some apartments on the upper floors of some buildings. Aside from buildings other sites are included, such as, cannons, a drinking fountain, sculptures and a well house.

=== F.G. Jones Block ===
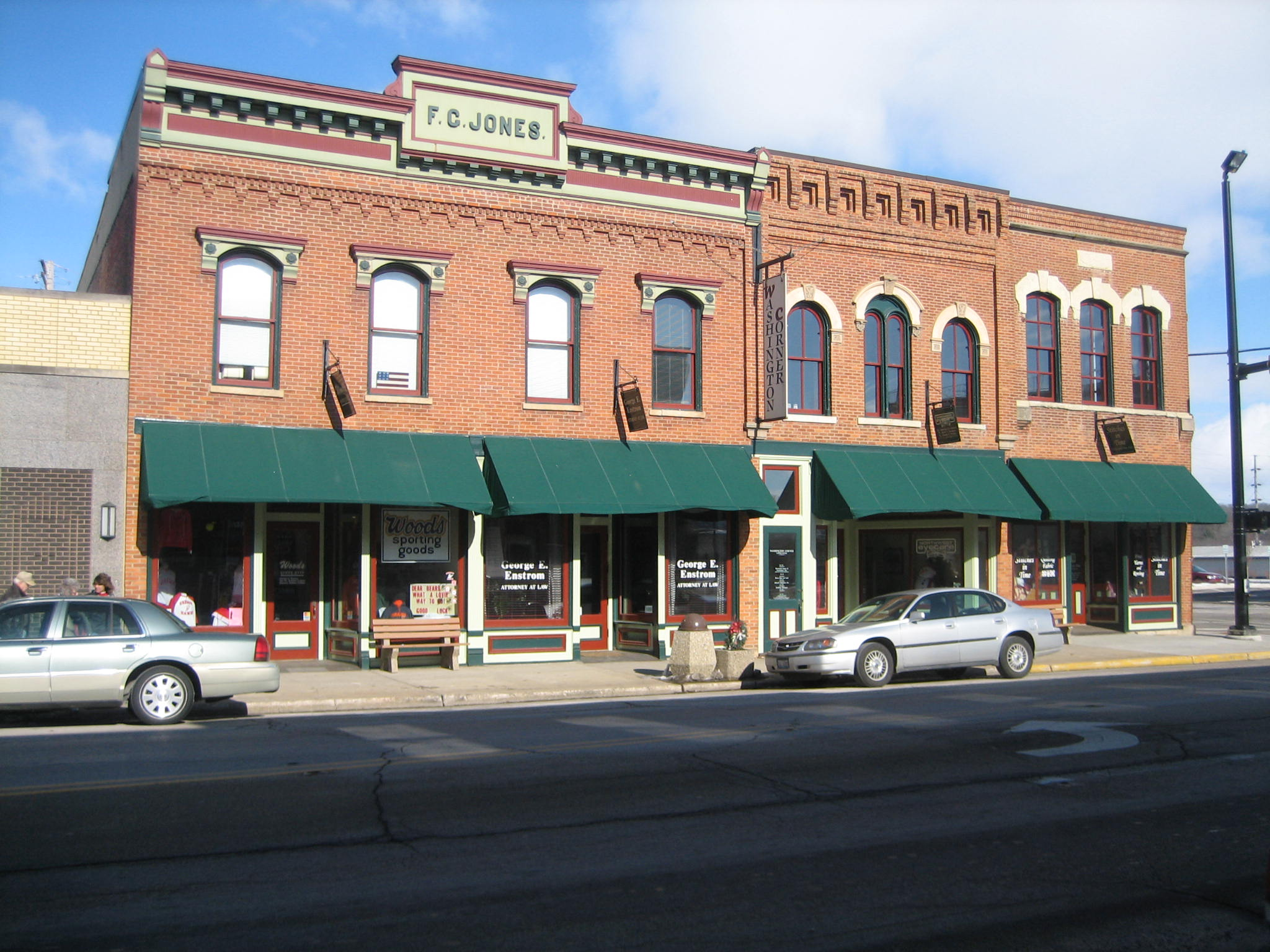
The 300 Block of Washington, including the F.G. Jones Block.

This two-story Italianate structure is attached to two other historically significant buildings at the corner of Washington and Third Streets in Oregon. It is the most ornately detailed of the three.

=== Jacobs Block ===
The three-story Italianate Jacobs Block was known also as the National Clothing House. The structure was built sometime around 1870 and the aluminum awning was added in the 1960s.

=== Masonic Temple Lodge No. 420 ===
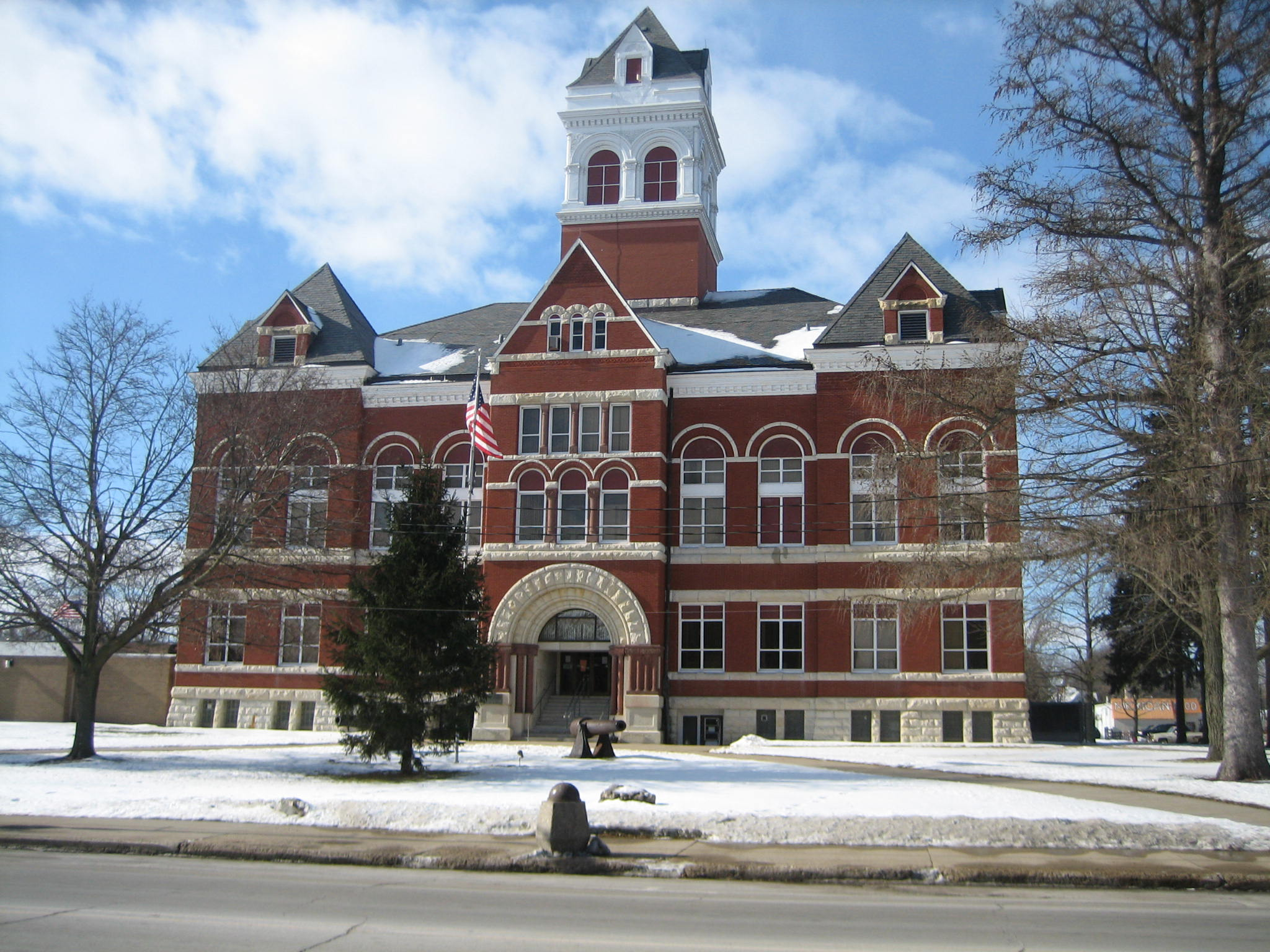
The Old Ogle County Courthouse.

This three story yellow brick building is in the 100 Block of South Fourth Street. Its exterior is decorated with ivory brick detailing and it sports a three globe milk glass sign over the door on its second story.

=== Old Ogle County Courthouse ===
The Romanesque Revival Ogle County Courthouse stands in the middle of a large public square. Though no longer the county's primary judiciary center some county office still occupy the first two floors. The building was designed by Chicago architect George O. Garnsey and constructed in 1891.

=== Oregon City Hall ===
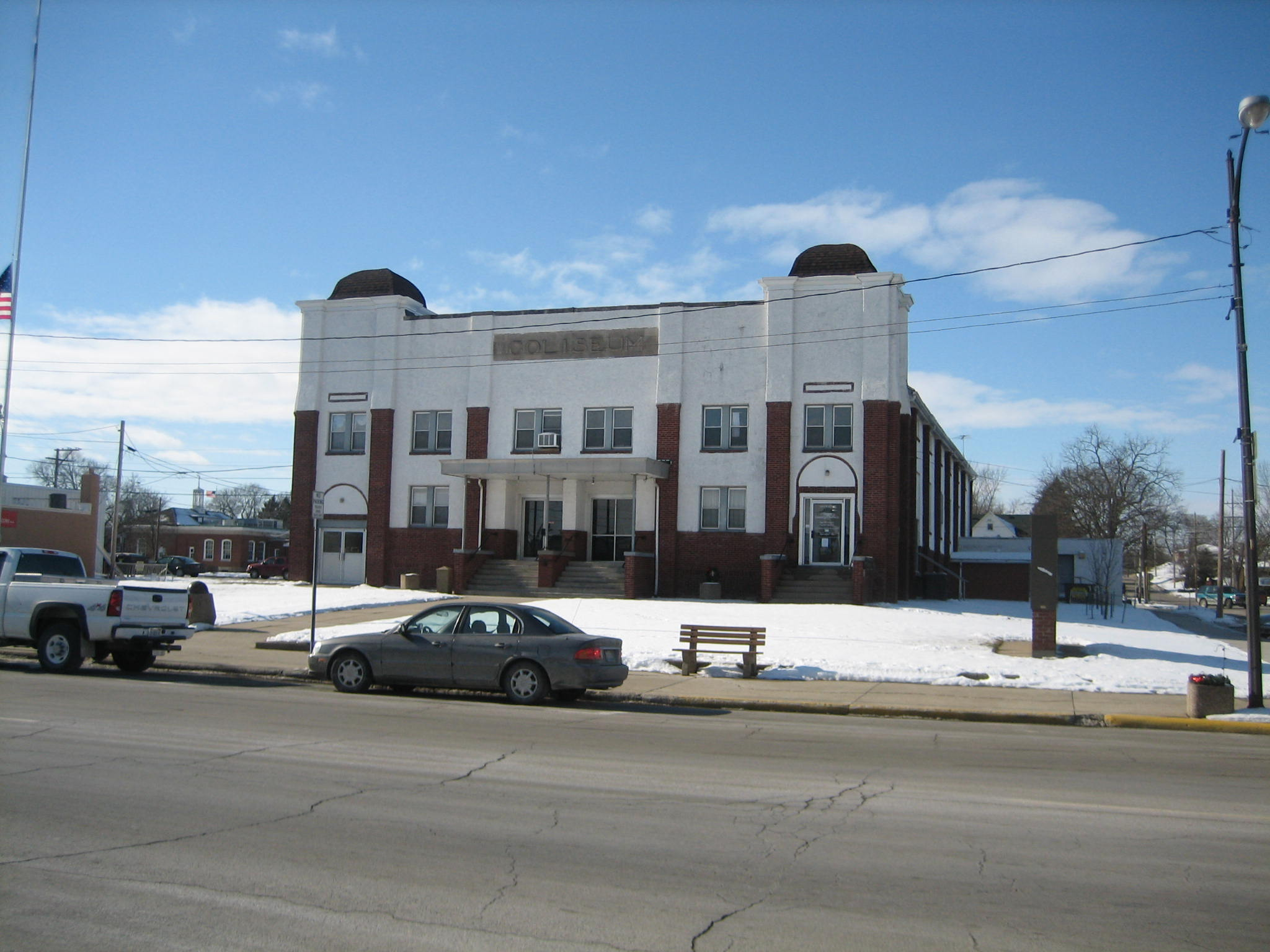
The Oregon Coliseum.

The Oregon City Hall was constructed in 1920, though its front facade, specifically the windows, have seen some renovations and replacement. The building is still home to the city government in Oregon, Illinois.

=== Oregon Coliseum ===
The Oregon Coliseum stands on the corner of Fourth Street and Franklin Street on the north end of the historic district. The largely stucco exterior is heavily influenced by Art Deco style.

=== Oregon Public Library ===
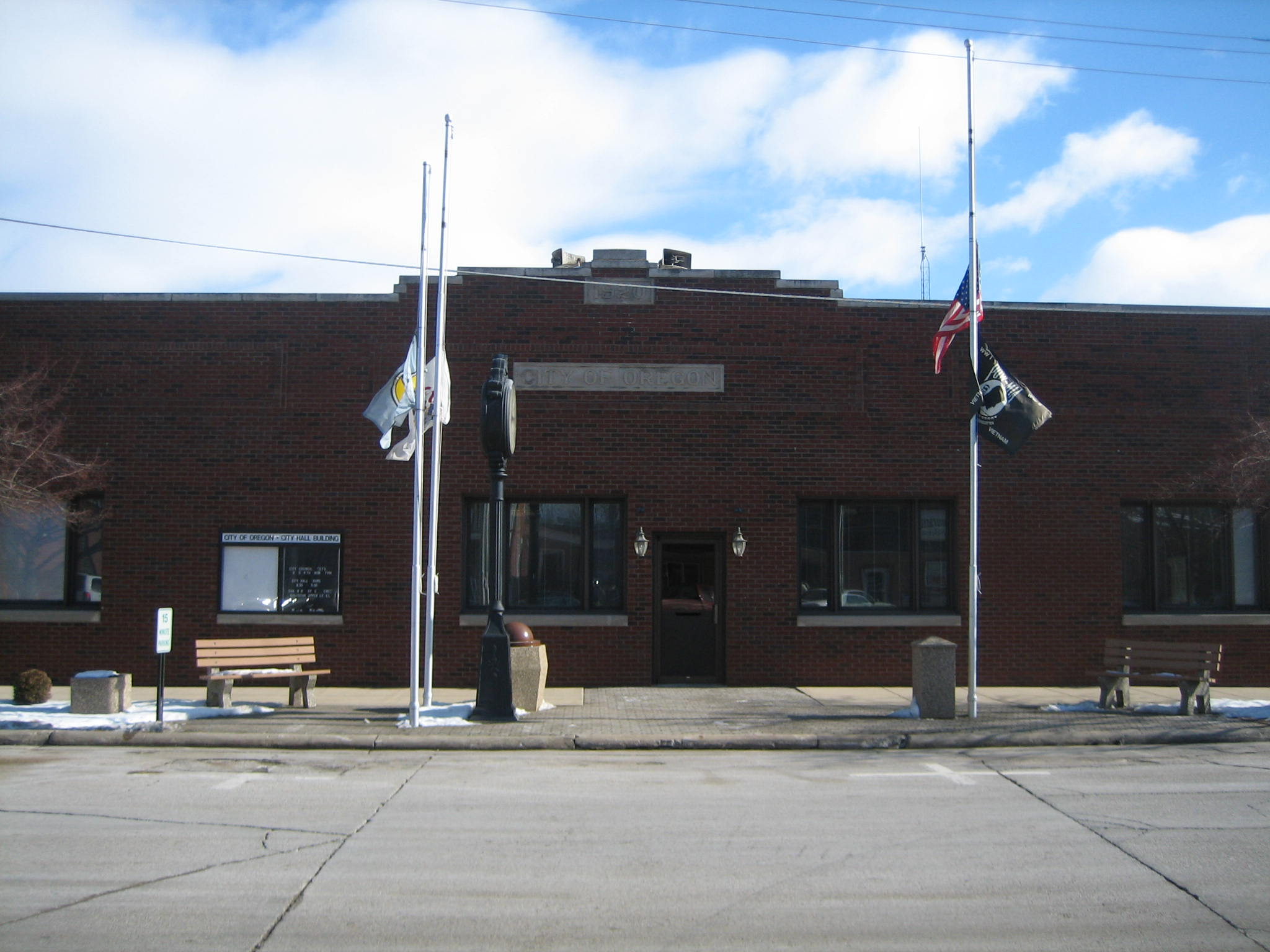
Oregon City Hall.

The design of the Oregon Public Library is a product of the Arts and Crafts Movement. Its second story includes an art gallery which displays works from its permanent collection which includes donated works created by Lorado Taft and Nathaniel Currier.

=== Oregon Theater ===
This 1910 theater building started as the Star Theater and was later the Oregon Theater. The facade was re-clad around 1940. Though now converted for commercial use the building still features its marquee with "OREGON" written on it in large neon letters.

=== Other notable structures ===
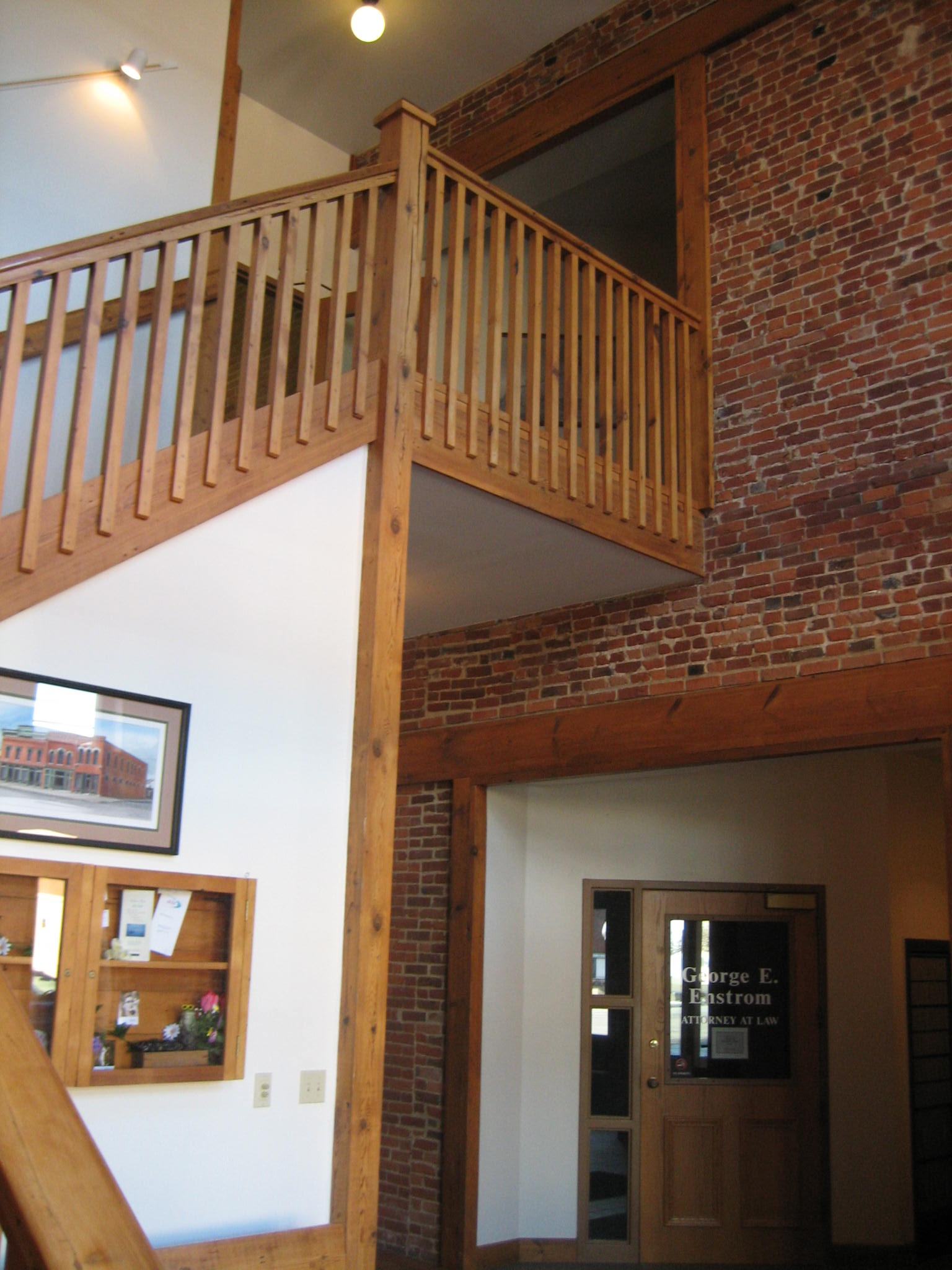
Interior, 302 Washington St.

- 125 S. Fourth St.
- 300 Washington St.
- 302 Washington St.
- Iron Mike
- F.G. Jones Block
- Oregon State Savings Bank Building
- U.S. Post Office

=== Rock River Hotel ===
This traditional I-house structure was built around the beginning of the American Civil War and began its history as a private residence. Later it was converted into the Rock River Hotel and then later the Blackhawk Hotel. Oregon once had three historic hotel buildings, the Rock River Hotel is the last of those standing.

=== Schiller Piano Company ===
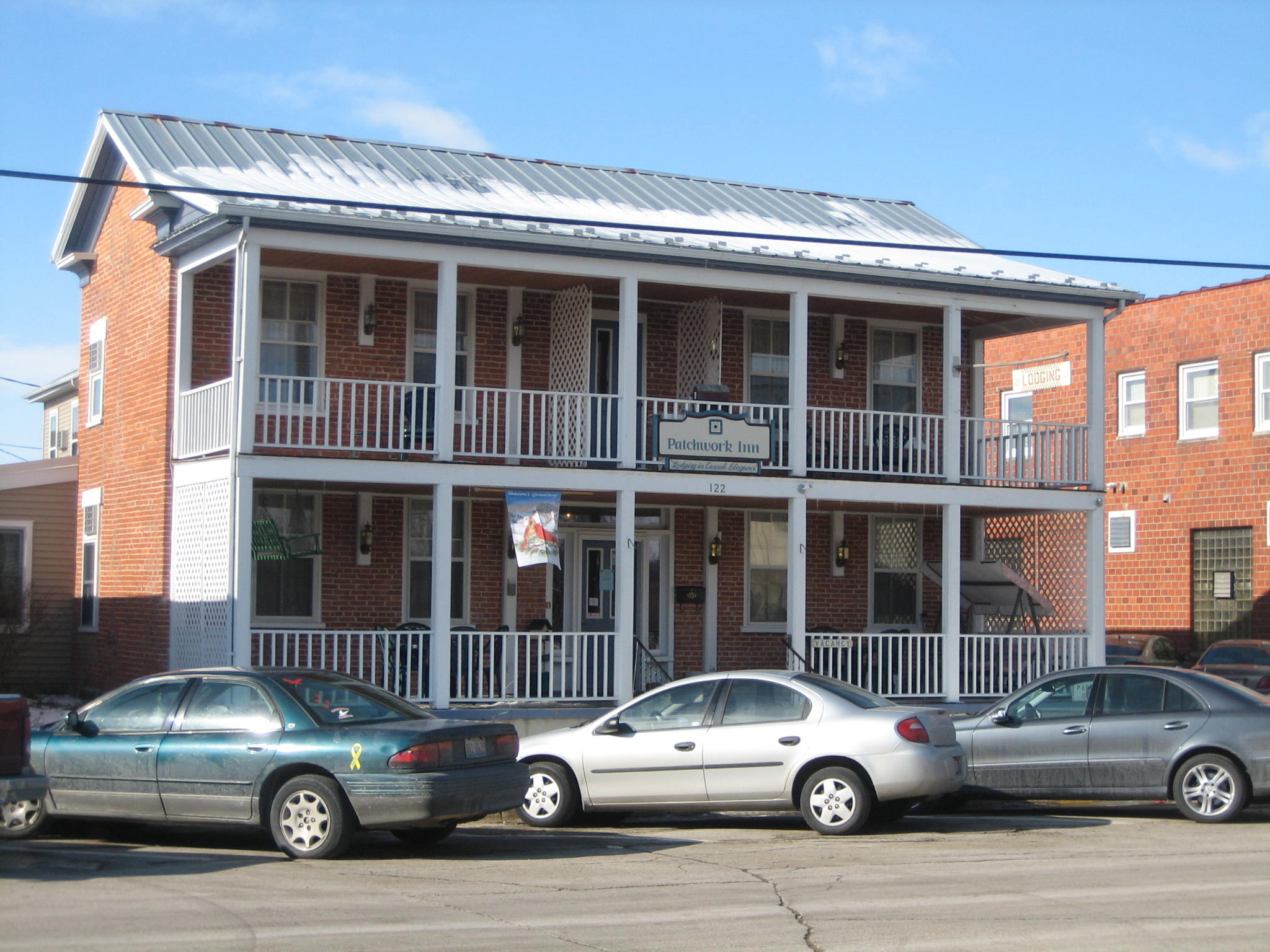
The Rock River Hotel.

Historically Ogle County's largest employer the Schiller Piano Company building is a 120,000-square-foot (11,000 m^{2}) industrial building on the northern end of the district. Its iron water tower base still stands in the northwest section of the lot. Both separately contribute to the integrity of the historic district.

=== T. Goings Building ===
The two-story Italianate T. Goings Building stands out because of wooden pediment over the brick parapet which is emblazoned with the name "T. Goings". The building was constructed of red brick in 1895.

=== The Soldiers' Monument ===
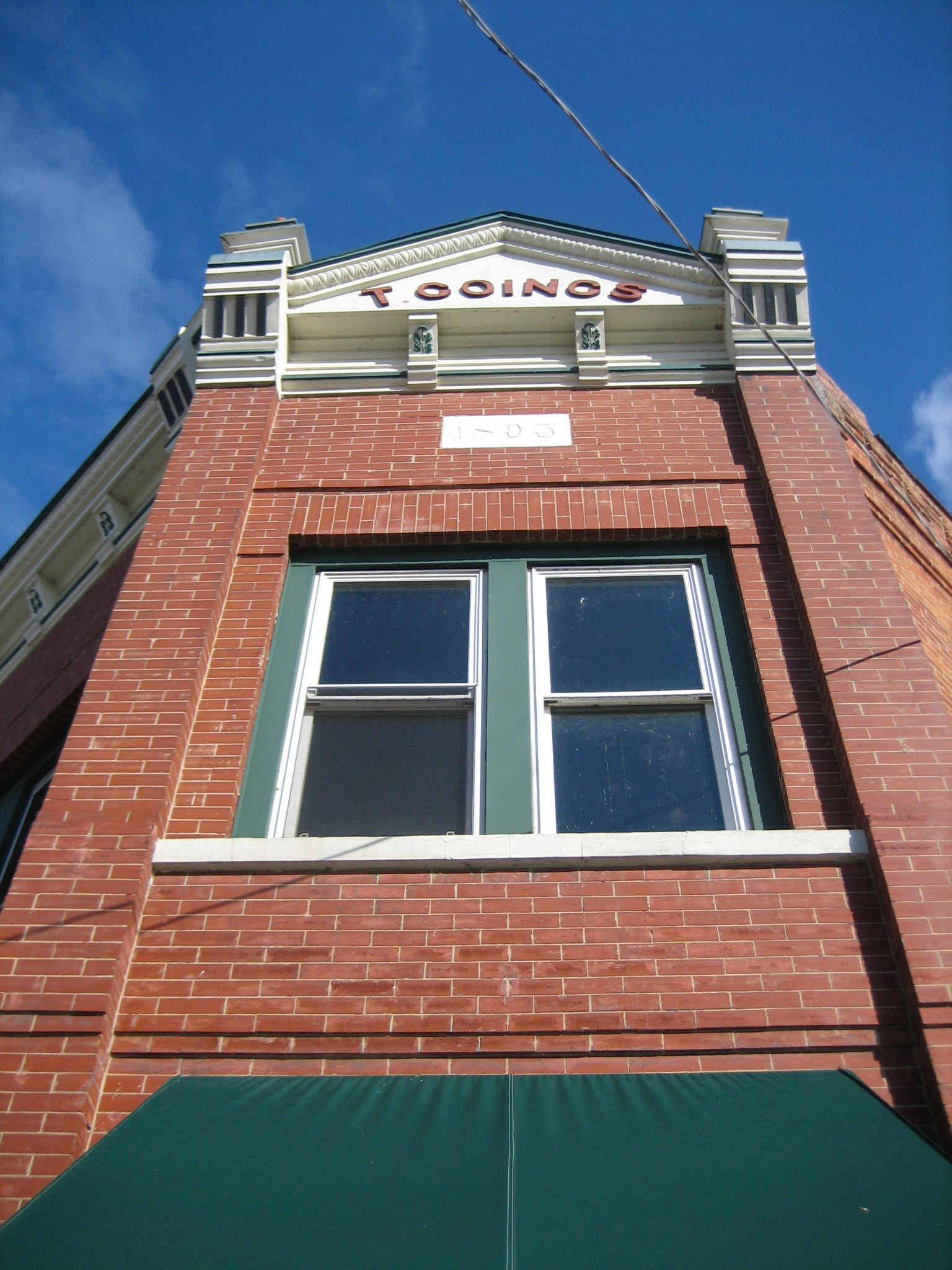
The T. Goings Building.

The Soldiers' Monument is located on the courthouse square. It features three sculptures by Lorado Taft and an exedra designed by the architects Allen and Iriving Pond. It was originally dedicated to Ogle County veterans of the Civil and Spanish–American Wars, later World War I veterans were added.

=== Union Block Opera House ===
The three-story structure known as the Union Block, or Hall, Opera House is a Romanesque Revival influenced building constructed around 1880.

=== Unity Building ===
The Unity Building is an ornate Queen Anne commercial building. It has a large second story oriel which causes it to stand out from the surrounding buildings which are designed in a more sedate Classical Revival and Italianate styles.
