= Indian Statue =

Indian Statue may refer to:

- Black Hawk Statue
- Cigar store Indian
