= Eagle's Nest Art Colony =

Former art colony in Oregon, Illinois, US

Coordinates: 42.034°N 89.325°W

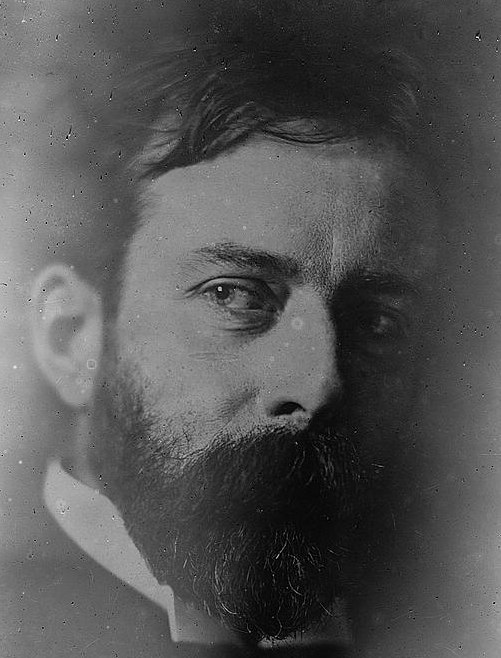
American sculptor Lorado Taft founded the Eagle's Nest Art Colony in 1898.

The Eagle's Nest Art Colony, the site known in more modern times as the Lorado Taft Field Campus, was founded in 1898 by American sculptor Lorado Taft on the bluffs flanking the east bank of the Rock River, overlooking Oregon, Illinois. The colony was populated by Chicago artists, all members of the Chicago Art Institute or the University of Chicago art department, who gathered in Ogle County to escape the summer heat of Chicago. The colony complex has been used as a field campus for Northern Illinois University since 66 acres (27 ha) of Lowden State Park were turned over to the university by the state of Illinois.

== History ==
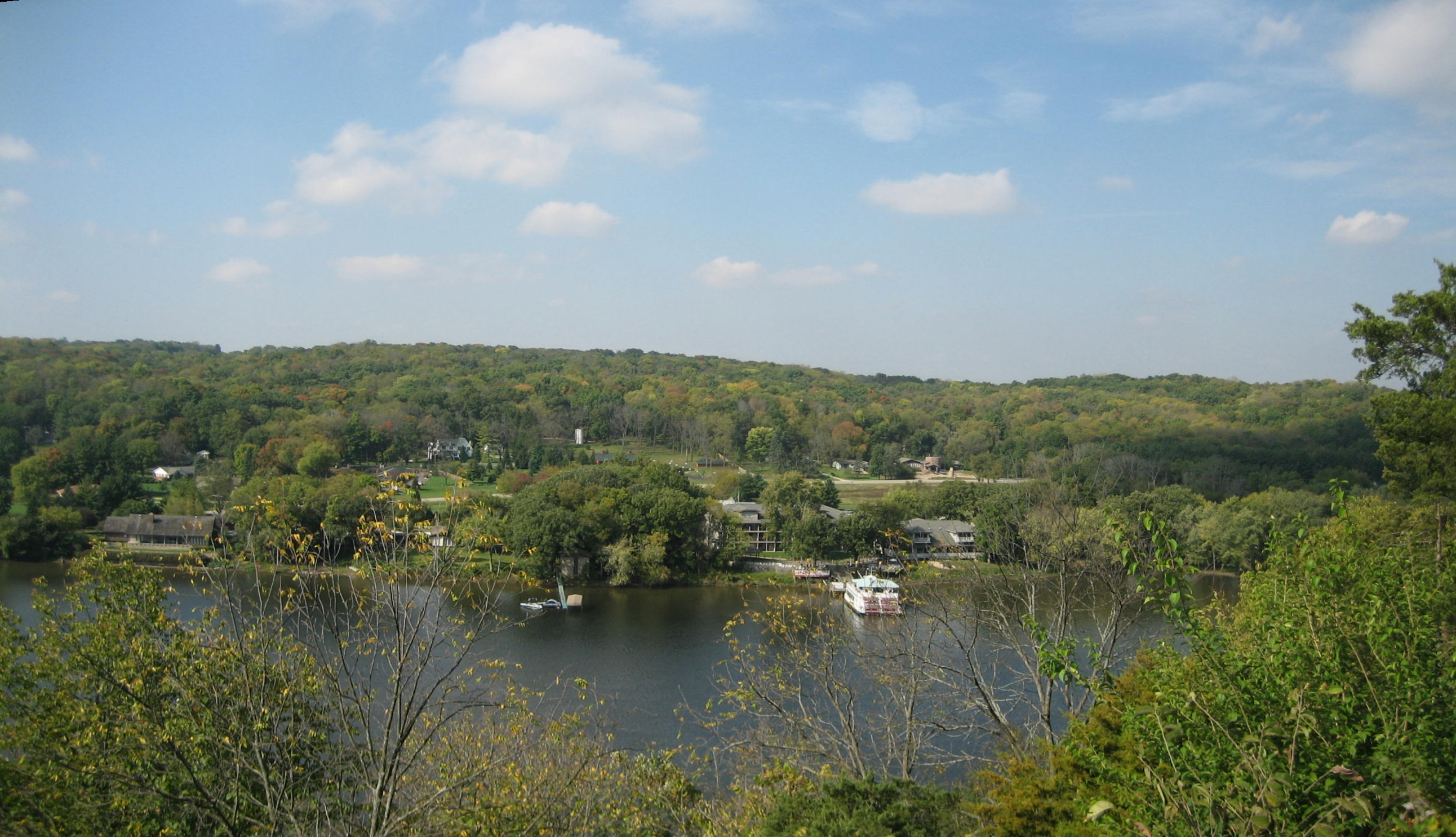
The present-day view from Eagle's Nest Bluff overlooking the Rock River

The Eagle's Nest Art Colony Association was founded in 1898 by American sculptor Lorado Taft on the bluffs flanking the east bank of the Rock River, overlooking Oregon, Illinois. The colony was populated by Chicago artists, all members of the Chicago Art Institute or the University of Chicago art department, who gathered in Ogle County to escape the summer heat of Chicago.

The colony was started by eleven men, all artists, architects and art lovers affiliated with Taft in Chicago. The original members were: Taft, Ralph Elmer Clarkson, Oliver Dennett Grover, Charles Francis Browne, Henry B. Fuller, Hamlin Garland, Horace Spencer Fiske, James Spencer Dickerson, Allen Bartlit Pond, Irving Kane Pond and Clarence Dickerson. The original members first lived in tents at the colony, later, after the association's constitution was written, charter and regular members were allowed to build summer homes.

The group began their search for a summer reprieve from Chicago a few years before the site along the Rock River was chosen. Their first colony, at Bass Lake, Indiana, ended after a malaria outbreak. As the colony founders searched for a home for their colony Chicago attorney and patron of the arts Wallace Heckman purchased the land that would eventually become the Eagle's Nest Colony in 1898. Taft and his peers looked toward Wisconsin after leaving Bass Lake, but Heckman invited the group to his home in Ogle County for the Fourth of July. Heckman offered to let the group set up camp there and they signed a lease for the site the same week. The lease provided 15 acres (6.1 ha) of land for US$1 per year with the stipulation that each colony member give a free lecture or demonstration in the area.

Other famous writers and artists who visited the colony include: James H. Breasted, Charles R. Crane, I.K. Friedman, George Barr McCutcheon, John T. McCutcheon, Harriet Monroe, William Vaughn Moody, Elia W. Peattie, Lucy Fitch Perkins, Bert Leston Taylor, Nellie Walker, and Donald Peattie.

== Taft campus ==
Leslie A. Holmes proposed a "field campus" for Northern Illinois Teachers College in his inaugural address as president in 1948. On August 7, 1951, Illinois governor Adlai E. Stevenson II signed a bill into law which transferred ownership of a 66-acre (27 ha) section of Lowden State Park to the college, now Northern Illinois University (NIU). The land encompassed the former 15-acre (6.1 ha) site of the Eagle's Nest Art Colony and its buildings. The Black Hawk Statue was not included in the land transfer. The campus was named after Lorado Taft and is now known as the NIU Lorado Taft Field Campus.

The buildings of the art colony, long neglected, were restored under the supervision of Paul Harrison, a professor at the college. By 1954 work was completed on the Browne House, Poley Hall (also known as the Camp House), and the Taft House. Harrison then served as field campus director from 1954–65. In October 1965 the campus was augmented by the addition of 71 acres (29 ha).

== Buildings and structures ==
=== Studios ===
Taft's original studio at the colony was a converted barn northwest of the present-day Director's House. A small wooden building, the studio had a highly sloped roof which allowed large figures to be built inside. A skylight poured natural light into Taft's work area, and a concrete porch on its exterior. The first working models of the Black Hawk Statue were created inside the studio. Taft's original studio is no longer extant, and the present-day craft shop was built on its site.

Ralph Clarkson had a small wooden studio at the colony as well. Clarkson's studio was located about 100 feet (30 m) northeast of the Taft House and was well fenestrated, with many windows on three of its four facades. Clarkson painted several portraits in the studio including the likenesses of Chicago Mayor Carter Harrison, and University of Chicago President Harry Pratt Judson.

=== Fiske, Clarkson, and Grover Cottages ===
Grover Cottage is no longer extant, though the stone fireplace still stands in the location of the original building. Construction on the cottage of painter Oliver Dennett Grover was completed in 1902. The building, a permanent structure of stucco with a shingled roof, stood southeast of the Camp House. It was erected in 1902. The cottage was sometimes occupied by others when the Grovers were not present. Elia Peattie penned her story "The Girl From Grand Detour" inside Grover Cottage in 1908.

=== Dickerson Cottage and house ===
The original Dickerson Cottage was constructed in 1898 in the location of the present-day Dickerson House. Dickerson completed the construction with the help of a local builder and the finished product was intended to be a one-room building with a partition as the only interior division. The building was expanded in 1908 when a new porch, living room, kitchen and bathroom were added.

=== Poley House ===
. . . And here all interesting animals lived together in the most copious and rural harmony.

— Colony motto, paraphrased from Lear's The Story of the Four Little Children Who Went Round the World

The Poley House, varyingly known as Camp House and, more recently, Poley Hall, is a classroom meeting space and houses a bird viewing porch at the Lorado Taft Campus. Original construction was completed on the Allen and Irving Pond designed building in 1902. Bricks above the large, 25-by-33-foot (7.6 by 10.1 m) fireplace were emblazoned with the art colony motto, a quote taken from Edward Lear.

=== Browne Cottage ===
Charles Francis Browne Cottage is located east of the camp house. The building, which boasted the colony's only flight of stairs, had stone added to the exterior by Browne.

== Major works at Eagle's Nest ==
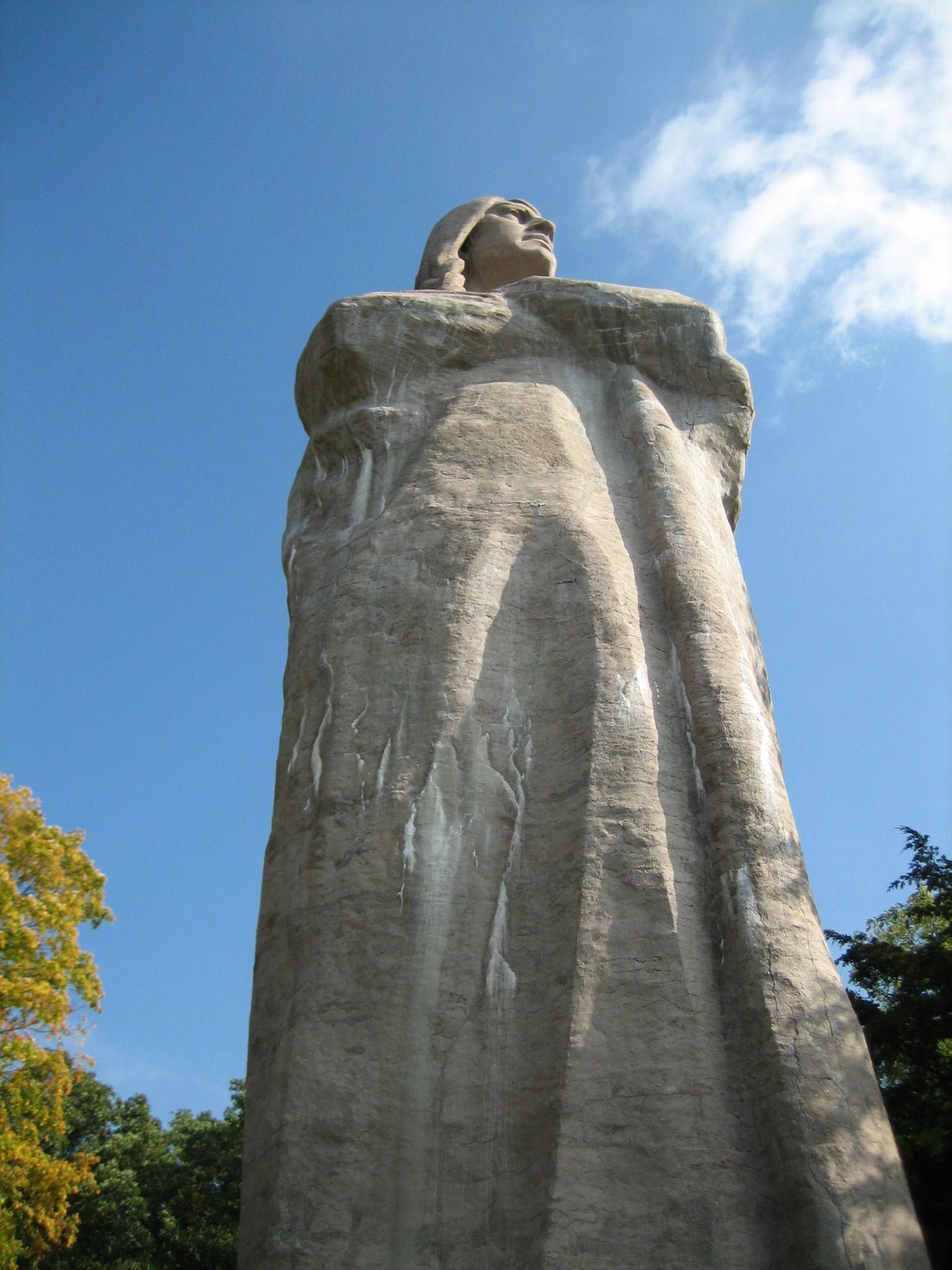
Black Hawk Statue at Lowden State Park

In the summer of 1843, more than 50 years before the colony occupied the land, Margaret Fuller made her only visit to Oregon, Illinois. Walking along the east bank of the Rock River during her visit, she noticed the natural spring at the base of the bluff. She dubbed the spring "Ganymede Spring", and later sat down beneath the Eagle's Nest Tree, and penned her famous poem "Ganymede to His Eagle". An island at the center of the Rock River across from the eventual colony was named Margaret Fuller Island in her honor.

Southeast of the former location of Taft's studio is the 1905 sculpture The Funeral Procession. The piece was the collaborative work of six of Taft's students who had taken up residence at the colony for the summer. The assignment required each student to create a human figure but left the subject of the sculpture to their collective choice. The end result is a piece with six human figures carrying a casket on their shoulders.

Standing prominently on Eagle's Nest Bluff is Lorado Taft's famed Black Hawk Statue; the bluff is now part of Lowden State Park. The statue was created by Lorado Taft, beginning in 1908. Taft at first created smaller studies of what would become the statue. The statue itself was dedicated in 1911, Taft noted at the dedication that the statue seemed to have grown out of the ground. The statue stands 125 feet (38 m) above the Rock River, though its height only accounts for 48 feet (15 m) of that. Black Hawk weighs in at 536,770 pounds and is said to be the second largest concrete monolithic statue in the world.

== Ganymede Spring ==
Ganymede Spring, or Ganymede's Spring, is located along a path near the east bank of the Rock River at the base of Eagle's Nest Bluff, about 0.25 miles (400 m) north of the Black Hawk Statue. The natural spring, which originates in the limestone beneath Fond du Lac, Wisconsin, supplied the colony with water for cooking, drinking and for use in their swimming pools. One pool was at the base of the spring and the other was located where the present-day NIU parking lot is found. The original pool at the base of the spring can still be seen when the water level on the Rock River is low. Originally, from 1898–1902 water was transported up the hill by horse and wagon. By 1902 a large pump was installed, though it took two attempts, and a water tower dispensed water to the various buildings.

== Influence ==
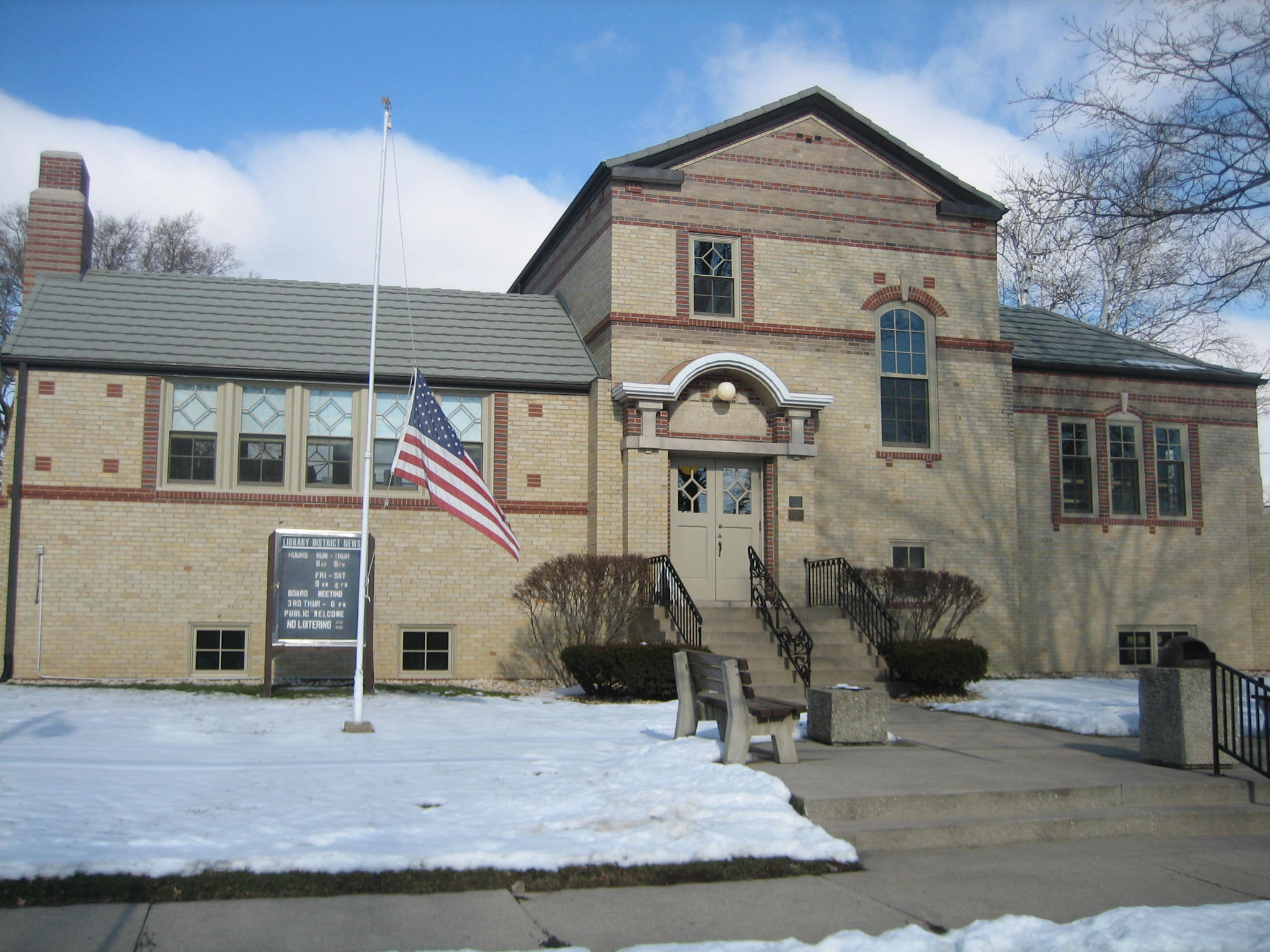
The Oregon Public Library's design was influenced by members of the colony.

The art colony influenced and contributed to area culture, in part due to the requirements of their lease. Two of the charter members of the art colony were Chicago architects, Allen and Irving Pond, who designed the Oregon Public Library, a Carnegie library building, heavily influenced by the presence of the art colony. It was the Ponds' association with the Eagle's Nest Art Colony that led them to design the library. Even before the library was built, members of the Eagle's Nest Art Colony were pushing for the new building to include a second-story art gallery. The building was constructed after an Andrew Carnegie grant approval, and its first use came in October 1908 by Leon A. Malkielski, a colony member, for an exhibition of 100 paintings. The library proper did not begin providing its services until 1909. Hamlin Garland, a 1921 Pulitzer Prize recipient for literature, spoke at the Oregon library while he was a member of the Eagle's Nest Colony. The second floor art gallery on the second floor of the library building was not formally dedicated until July 4, 1918. This marked the beginning of the library's permanent collection, which started with additions from members of the Eagle's Nest Colony.

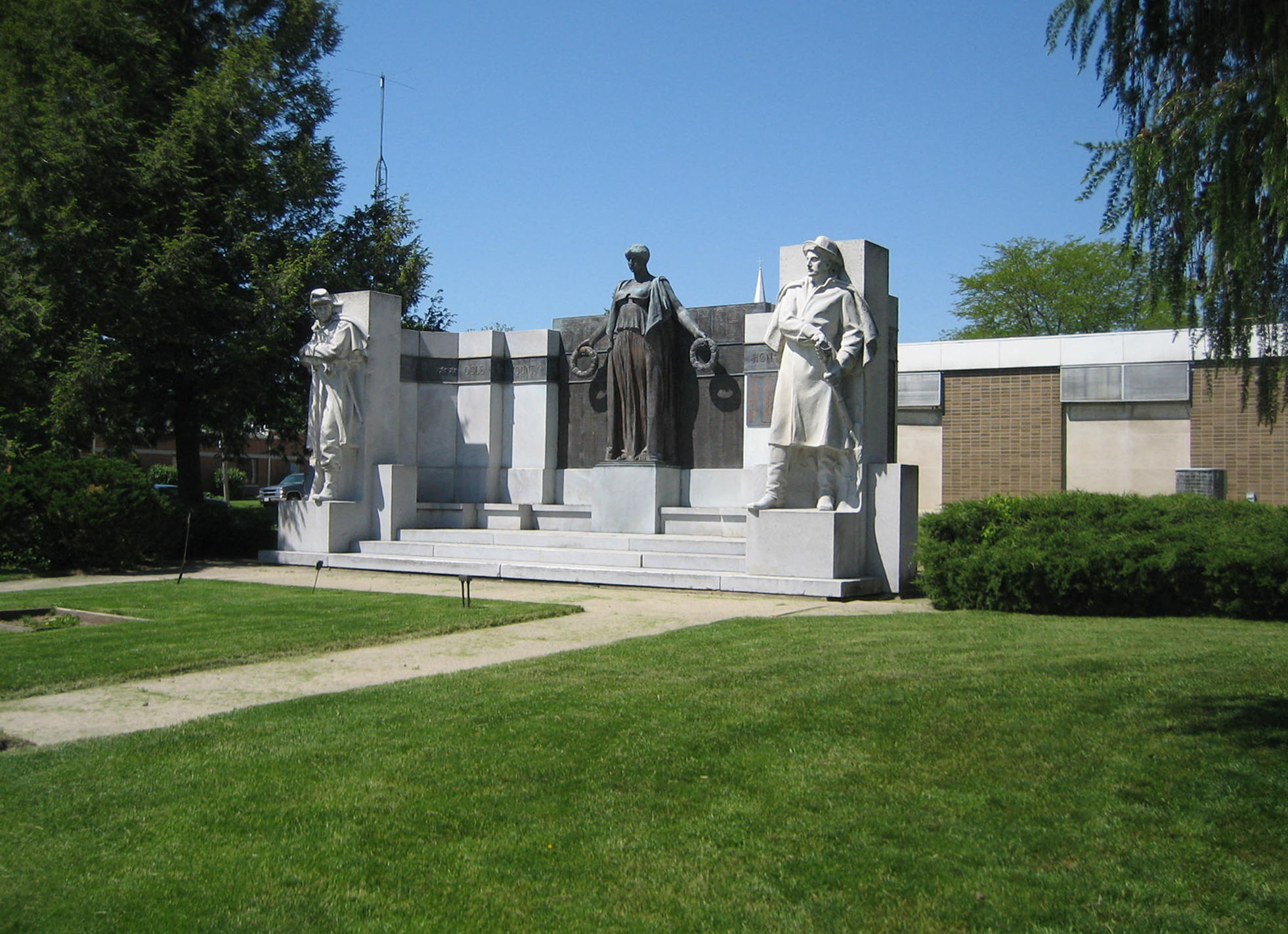
Lorado Taft's The Soldiers' Monument in Oregon, Illinois

Taft is responsible for several works of sculpture within the nearby city of Oregon, and a number of pieces within the library art gallery are credited to members and associates of the art colony. The Soldiers' Monument is a Taft created sculpture that stands on the public square of the Old Ogle County Courthouse in Oregon. Taft's oversized Classical female figure stands with her arms outstretched, clutching laurel wreaths. Behind her is an exedra which was designed by colony members and architects Pond and Pond. The exedra extends around the installation and to either side of the female sculpture are built in benches. Above the benches are bronze plaques honoring veterans of the Civil War and the Spanish–American War, above the individual war plaques is bronze plating that reads, "Ogle County Honors Her Sons." Flanking the dominant sculpture are two soldiers atop pedestals, one facing north and the other facing south.

The Fish Boys, or Dolphin Fountain, is another Taft work located in Oregon. The fountain consists of two boys kneeling on the edge of a pool of water, each holding a large fish. Water from the mouths of the fish pours into the shallow pool. The figures were originally cast in bronze and designed as part of the Fountain of the Great Lakes in Chicago. The Oregon Fish Boys are a blend of concrete, quartz and pebbles from the Potomac River. The fountain is located in Oregon's Mix Park.
