= Burright =

Burright is a surname. Notable people with the surname include:

- Larry Burright (1937–2025), American baseball player
- Neva Burright (1883–1958), American harness racing driver
