= Oregon Public Library =

- U.S. National Register of Historic Places
- U.S. Historic district – Contributing property
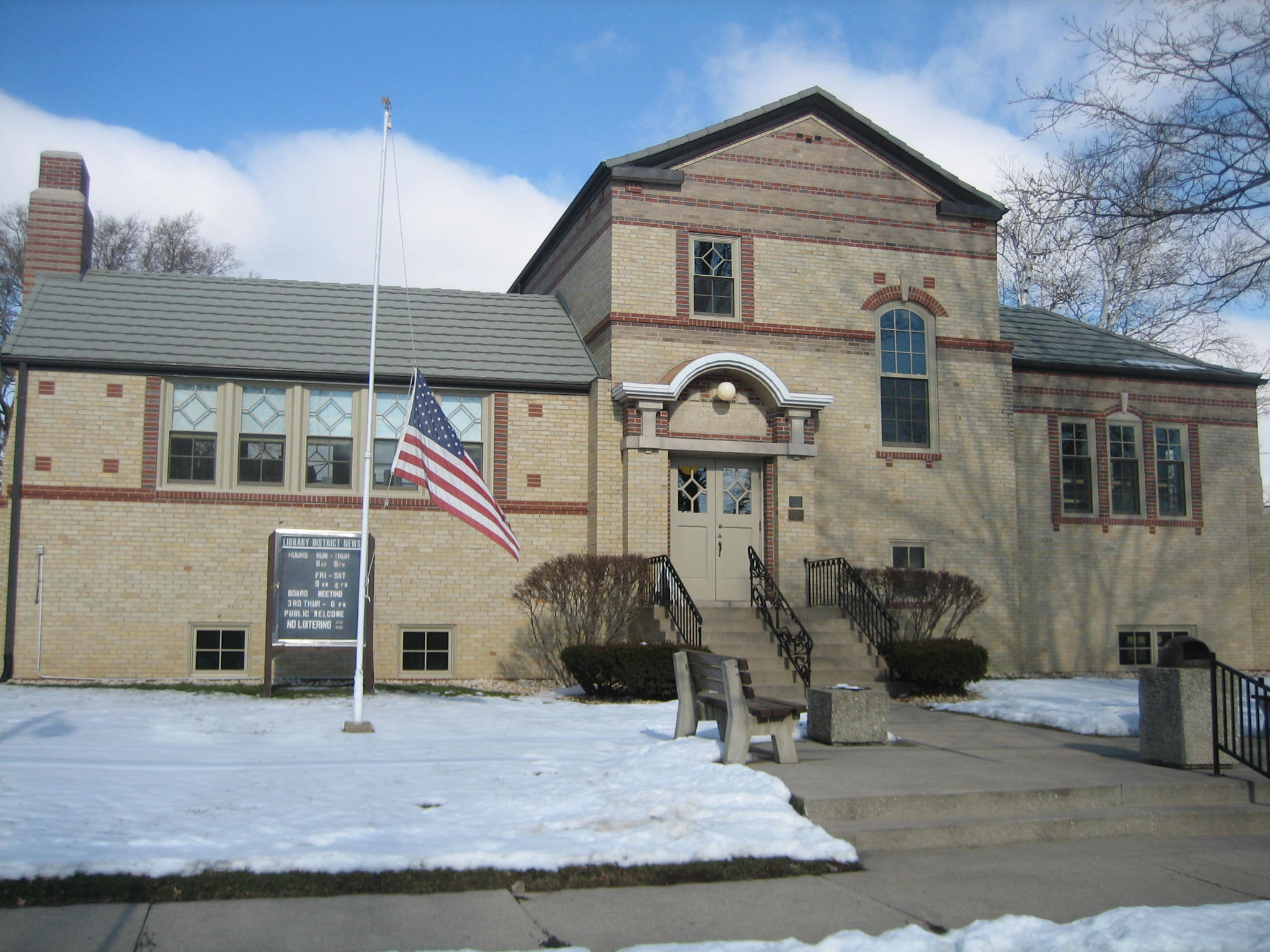
- The Oregon Public Library in January 2007.

- Location within Illinois Location within the United States
- Location: 300 Jefferson St., Oregon, Illinois
- Coordinates: 42°00′48.7″N 89°19′53.9″W
- Built: 1909
- Architect: Pond and Pond
- Architectural style: Arts & Crafts, Classical Revival
- Part of: Oregon Commercial Historic District (ID06000713)
- MPS: MPL015 - Illinois Carnegie Libraries Multiple Property Submission
- NRHP reference No.: 03000352
- Added to NRHP: May 9, 2003

The Oregon Public Library is located in Oregon, Illinois, United States, the county seat of Ogle County. The building is a public library that was constructed in 1909. Prior to 1909, Oregon's library was housed in different buildings, none of which were designed to house a library. The library was built using a grant from wealthy philanthropist Andrew Carnegie. The grant was obtained after Oregon's citizens voted to change Oregon's library from a city library to a township library. The building was completed by 1908 but the library did not begin operation until 1909.

The Oregon Library was designed by Chicago architects Pond and Pond. The Ponds were members of the Eagle's Nest Art Colony, founded by Lorado Taft, and their association with Taft and the colony led them to design the library. Their design was influenced by the colony, and a combination of two architectural styles, Classical Revival and the Arts and Crafts movement. The completed library included a second floor art gallery to which members of Eagle's Nest donated works for a permanent collection. The gallery's collection includes 64 paintings and sculptures as well as a Currier and Ives lithograph collection appraised at US$700,000. The Oregon Public Library was listed on the U.S. National Register of Historic Places in 2003, three years later it was included as a contributing property in a historic district that received the National Register designation.

== History ==
While the library building dates to the early 20th century the move toward intellectual outreach in Oregon started years before. The first Oregon library was organized in 1872, though it had no building of its own. Before the library had its own building, library books were stored in a drug store and then in the County Treasurer's office. Eventually the Oregon Library occupied rented office space in the First National Bank building. This situation persisted until 1905 when Oregon voters voiced their collective opinion on the library's future.

The citizens of Oregon were faced with a dilemma in 1905: either allow Oregon's library to remain, truly, Oregon's city library, or, by referendum, allow Oregon's library to make the shift into a township library. This change would allow the library one distinct advantage; it would qualify the library for a grant from Andrew Carnegie for the construction of a new building. Initially, Carnegie promised US$7,000 for the new library but once voters approved the change the grant amount was increased to $10,000. The grant, aside from requiring the library to hold "township library" status, required a site to be selected prior to the grant application process; a site, at the corner of Oregon's Jefferson and Third Streets, was selected.

== Art gallery ==
=== Eagle's Nest influence ===
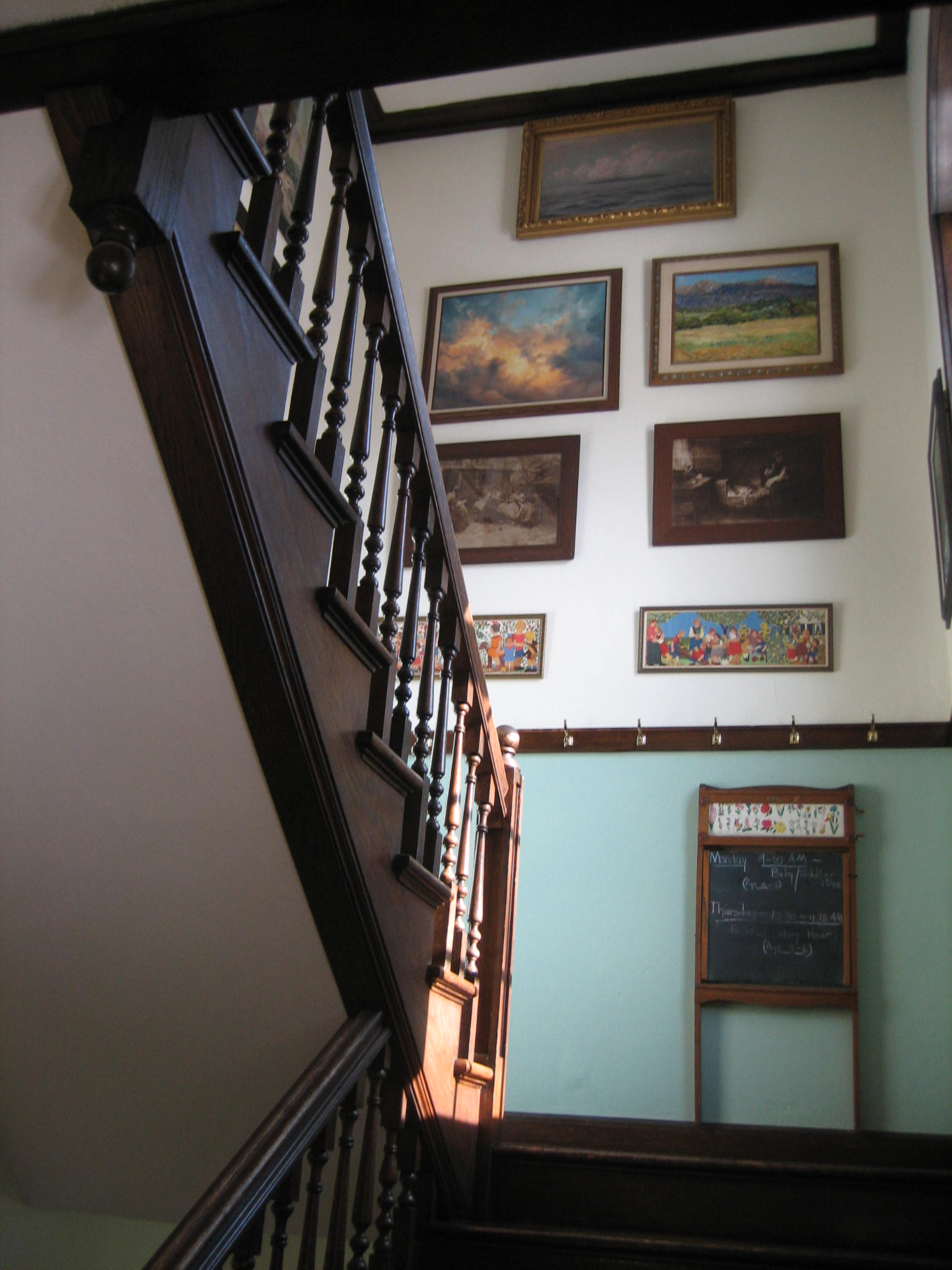
The art gallery on the library's second floor was built with influence from sculptor Lorado Taft.

Even before the library was built, members of the Eagle's Nest Art Colony were pushing for the new building to include a second-story art gallery. The colony, founded in 1898 by sculptor Lorado Taft, was based on the bluffs flanking the east bank of the Rock River, overlooking Oregon. Later in Carnegie's philanthropy his secretary James Bertram laid out strict requirements, including requirements which discouraged multiple uses for Carnegie libraries. Another requirement stipulated that Bertram approve library plans prior to grant approval or construction. The Oregon library, however, was constructed before Bertram's requirements were published and includes the gallery.

The art colony at Eagle's Nest was populated by Chicago artists, all members of the Chicago Art Institute or the University of Chicago art department, who gathered in Ogle County to escape the summer heat of Chicago. Two of the charter members of the art colony were the Chicago architects, Allen and Irving Kane Pond, who designed the Oregon Public Library building. It was the Ponds' association with the Eagle's Nest Art Colony that led them to design the library.

The building was constructed after the Carnegie grant approval, and its first use came in October 1908 by Leon A. Malkielski, a colony member, for an exhibition of 100 paintings. The library proper did not begin providing its services until 1909. The colony tried to contribute to area culture by requiring its members to hold art shows, lectures, and other exhibitions throughout the early 20th century. With the library complete it began to play a role in those exhibitions. Hamlin Garland, a 1921 Pulitzer Prize recipient for literature, spoke at the Oregon library while he was a member of the Eagle's Nest Colony.

=== Collections ===
The gallery on the second floor of the library building was not formally dedicated until July 4, 1918. That date marked the beginning of the library's permanent collection, which started with additions from members of the Eagle's Nest Colony. Members donated twelve statues, twenty oil paintings, and four portraits to the permanent collection of the art gallery. One of the statues in the collection is a 4-foot (1.2-m) plaster study of The Eternal Indian by Lorado Taft. It was completed in 1908 as he prepared to create the Black Hawk Statue at the original site of the Eagle's Nest Colony. The entire permanent collection consists of 32 paintings and 32 sculptures from Eagle's Nest artists. A citizen left the library a Currier and Ives lithograph collection which contains 46 Currier and Ives lithographs and 14 lithographs by Nathaniel Currier. The two collections have been appraised at over $700,000.

In addition to the substantial historical art collection held by the library gallery the collection consists of works by local artists. One Oregon resident has donated artwork from the annual Grand Detour Art Show regularly. Other area residents have donated pieces as well. In all, the library holds about 30 contemporary works by local artists.

== Architecture ==
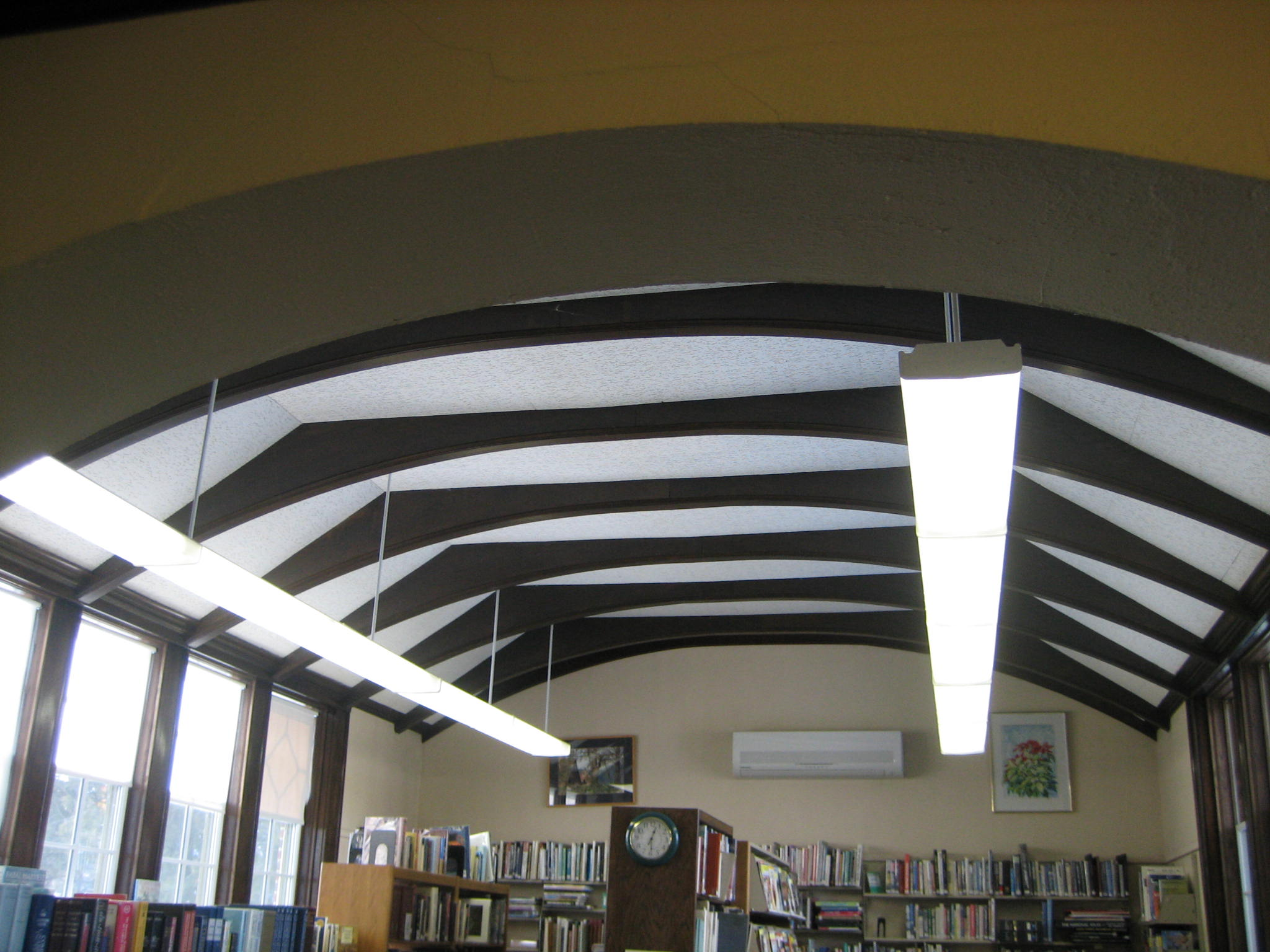
The ceilings, with their exposed beams, are commonly associated with Arts and Crafts.

The library is designed with an eye toward late 19th-century and early 20th-century movements in architecture. While it contains many elements common to Classical Revival architecture, the building's asymmetry and playfully creative style are distinctly characteristic of the Arts and Crafts Movement. The building was designed by the Chicago architectural firm of Pond and Pond and is constructed of buff-colored brick. Red-brick belt coursing and accents contrast the buff-colored brick on the majority of the facade. The two-story Oregon Public Library has a full brick basement and approximately 5,500 square feet (510 m^{2}) of floor space.

The building, though based on Classical architecture, is not entirely a Classical building. Its rooflines, main entrance, and the placement and style of the windows are all asymmetrical in nature, a hallmark of the Arts and Crafts style. Its simple massing and noticeable lack of ornamentation throughout the structure connects the building closely to the Arts and Crafts movement. This influence is seen most prominently on the building's interior.

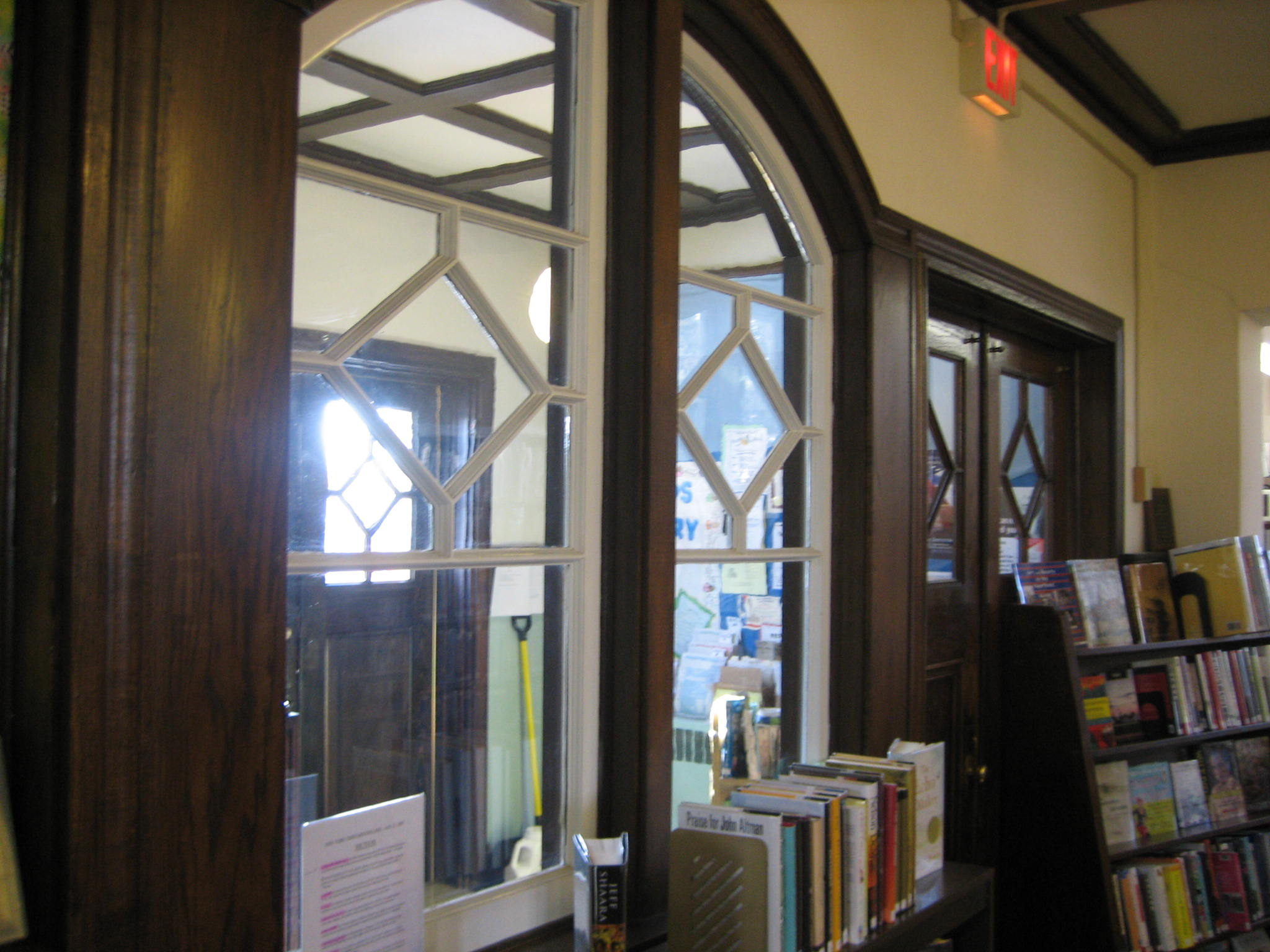
The four-panel wooden interior double doors are designed in an Arts and Crafts motif.

Though Arts and Crafts is specifically regarded as a movement within architecture, as opposed to a full-blown style, there are elements that are considered typical to buildings designed in the style. Examples include, dark, heavy woodwork and very simple ornamentation. The Oregon Public Library contains functional elements associated with that movement. Dark woodwork is found throughout the building, first in the stairwell to the gallery and its balusters and newel posts and then in the four-panel wooden interior door. The ceilings are coffered and have exposed wooden beams. Also located in the interior is a large 1909 wooden floor clock, a built-in storage cabinet, and two wooden fuse boxes that all evoke the Arts and Crafts movement.

The building does demonstrate elements of Classical Revival architecture but they are minimal and concentrated around the front entrance. Below the front entrance hood there are two stone pilasters and a stone lintel, as well as relief work adorning the pediment; leading to the front entrance are seven concrete stairs. The entire entry facade is a gable-front, temple style design and on the library's east wing there are stone-capped modified buttresses. Each of these elements demonstrates the Classical Revival style.

== Significance ==
The Oregon Public Library was added to the U.S. National Register of Historic Places on May 9, 2003, for its architectural and educational significance. The building represents a good example of the Arts and Crafts movement in architecture. As a Carnegie library, the Oregon Public Library satisfied the requirements laid out for listing on the National Register in the Illinois Carnegie Libraries Multiple Property Submission. When the Oregon Commercial Historic District was listed on the National Register of Historic Places in 2006 the Oregon Library was included as a contributing property. The library building is considered the most "outstanding" of the Craftsman or Arts and Crafts buildings within the historic district boundaries.

== See also ==
- Black Hawk Statue
- Lowden State Park
