= James H. Cartwright =

American judge

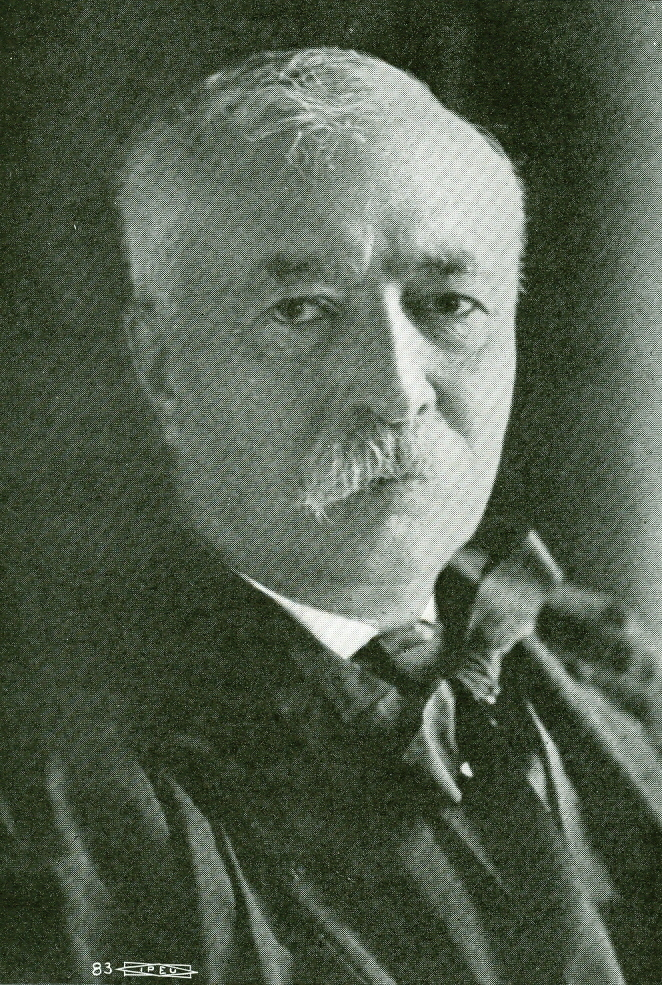
Cartwright in 1919

James H. Cartwright (December 1, 1842 – May 18, 1924) was an American jurist.

Born in Maquoketa, Iowa Territory, Cartwright moved with his family to Mount Morris, Illinois. He went to Mount Morris Seminary and University of Michigan. Cartwright taught school when the American Civil War started. He enlisted in the 69th Illinois Volunteer Regiment. After the war, Cartwright studied law in Oregon, Illinois and was admitted to the Illinois bar in 1867. He was elected an Illinois circuit court judge in 1888 and also served on the Illinois Appellate Court. Cartwright served on the Illinois Supreme Court from 1895 until his death in 1924. Cartwright died suddenly at his home in Oregon, Illinois.
