= Oregon City Hall =

- U.S. Historic district – Contributing property
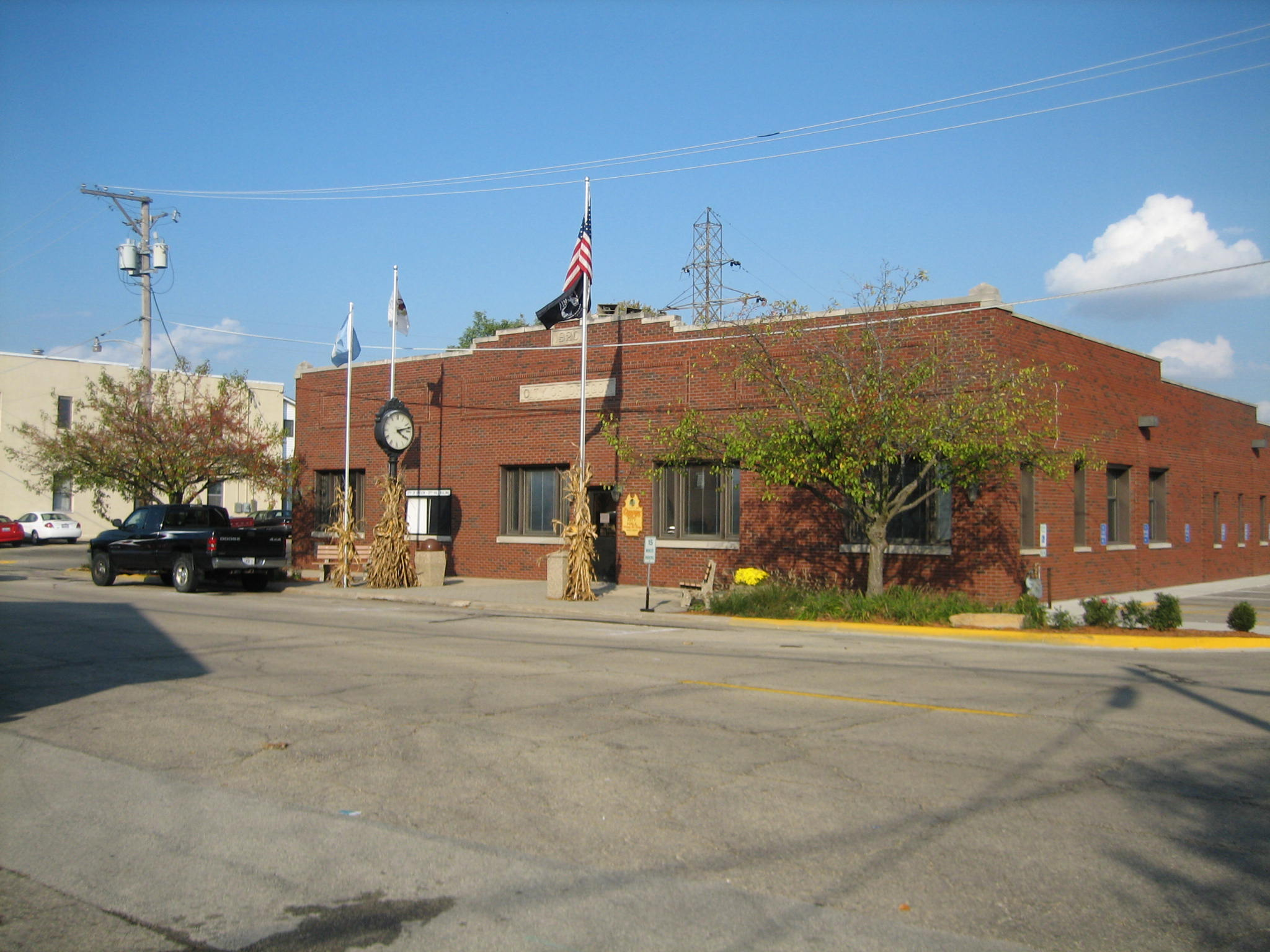

- Location within Illinois Location within the United States
- Location: Oregon, Ogle County, Illinois
- Coordinates: 42°00′54.8″N 89°19′51.6″W
- Built: 1920
- Part of: Oregon Commercial Historic District (ID06000713)

Oregon City Hall is the main municipal building for the Ogle County, Illinois city of Oregon. It stands on Oregon's Third Street, in the middle of the Oregon Commercial Historic District. The building is considered a contributing structure to the overall historical integrity of the historic district. Erected in 1920, the building, along with the rest of the historic district joined the National Register of Historic Places in August 2006.
