= Ralph Elmer Clarkson =

American painter

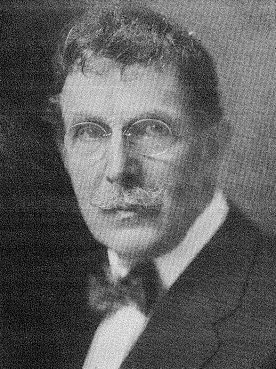
Ralph Elmer Clarkson (date unknown)

Ralph Elmer Clarkson (3 August 1861, Amesbury, Massachusetts - 5 April 1942, Orlando, Florida) was an American painter, known primarily for his portraits of public figures in and around Chicago.

== Biography ==
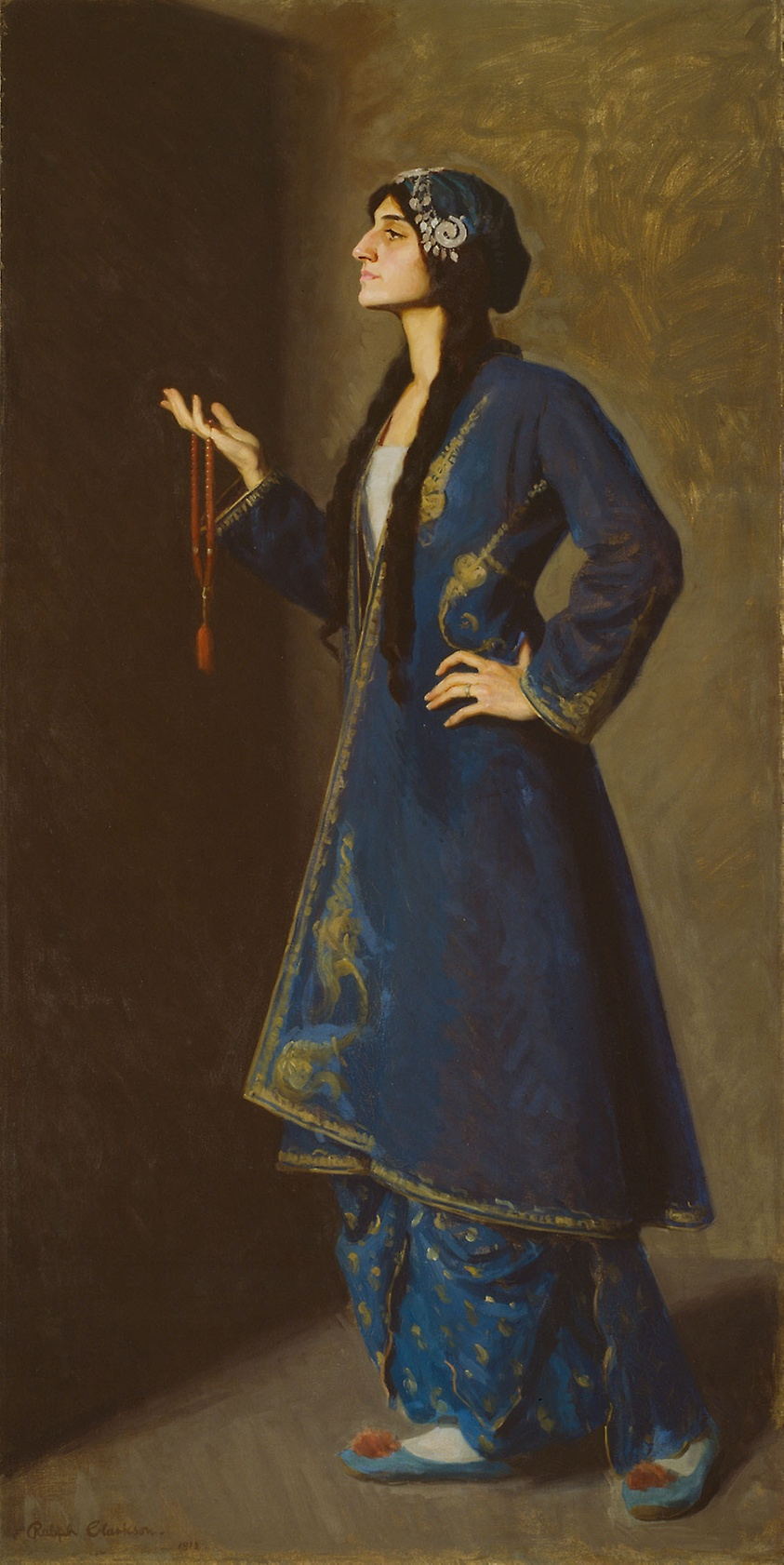
Nouvart Dzeron, Daughter of Armenia

His father was a carriage manufacturer of Scottish ancestry. He began his artistic training in 1881 at the new School of the Museum of Fine Arts in Boston with Frederic Crowninshield. This was followed by lessons at the Académie Julian in Paris, under the direction of Jules Lefebvre and Gustave Boulanger. His first exhibit at the Salon came in 1887.

After returning to the United States, he lived in Hartford, Connecticut. It was there that he married Frances Calhoun, the daughter of Judge David S. Calhoun (1827-1911). Shortly after, they moved to New York, where he became involved in exhibitions at the National Academy of Design. From 1892 to 1895, he travelled and painted in Europe; including a visit to the Prado Museum with William Merritt Chase. After returning once more, he decided to establish his studios in Chicago, due to the ample opportunities for portrait painting there.

Three years later, he became one of the first occupants of the newly refurbished Fine Arts Building on Michigan Avenue (formerly the Studebaker Carriage Shop). Soon, he was at the center of an artistic group that included Charles Francis Browne (1859-1920), Oliver Dennett Grover and Lorado Taft, who he assisted in creating the Eagle's Nest Art Colony on property provided by the Chicago attorney, Wallace Heckman (1851-1927).

He became one of the first members of the Cliff Dwellers Club in 1909. The following year, he became an Associate Member of the National Academy. He also taught at the Art Institute of Chicago. He was a member of the art juries at the Louisiana Purchase Exposition and the Panama-Pacific Exposition. In 1921, he created the first history of painters in Chicago for the journal Art and Archaeology.

Among his portraits are those of the physicist, Albert Michelson, several Governors of Illinois, including John Peter Altgeld, and Secretary of War Jacob M. Dickinson, which is on display in the Pentagon, and William Jennings Bryan, painted specifically at Bryan's request. The University of Chicago professors sometimes referred to him as their "court painter"

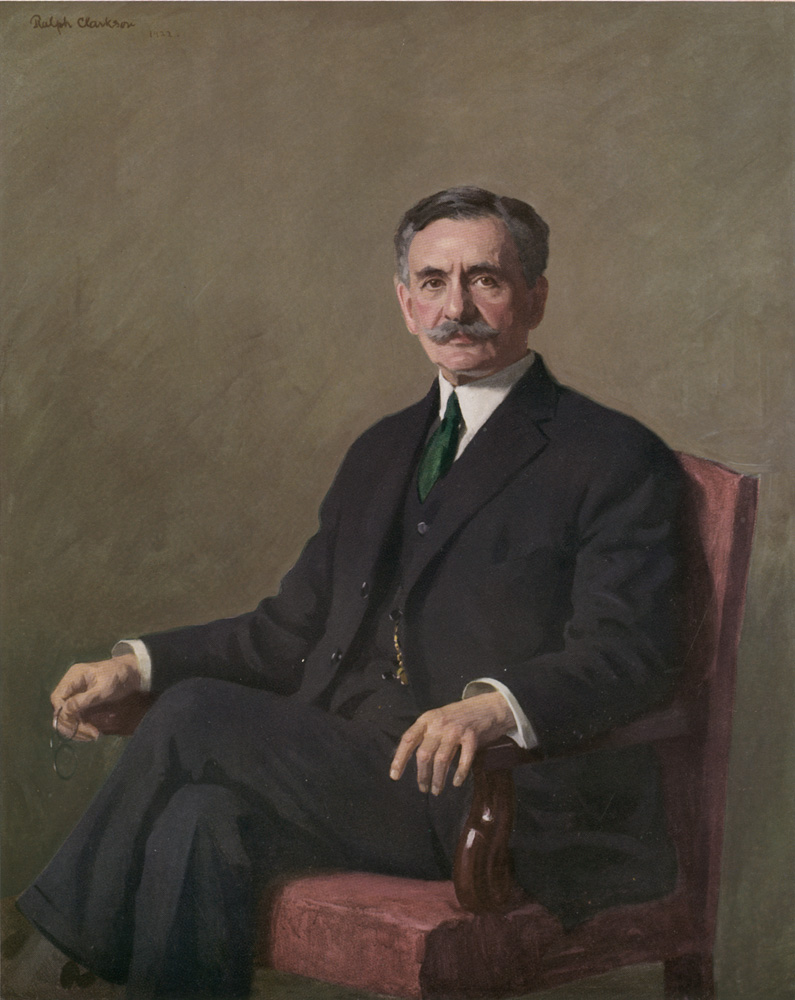
Portrait of Albert Michelson

According to a legal agreement, the lease for the Eagle's Nest would expire when the last member died, and Clarkson was that member. He died while vacationing in Florida.
