= Oregon station (Illinois) =

Historic train station in Ogle County, Illinois

Oregon
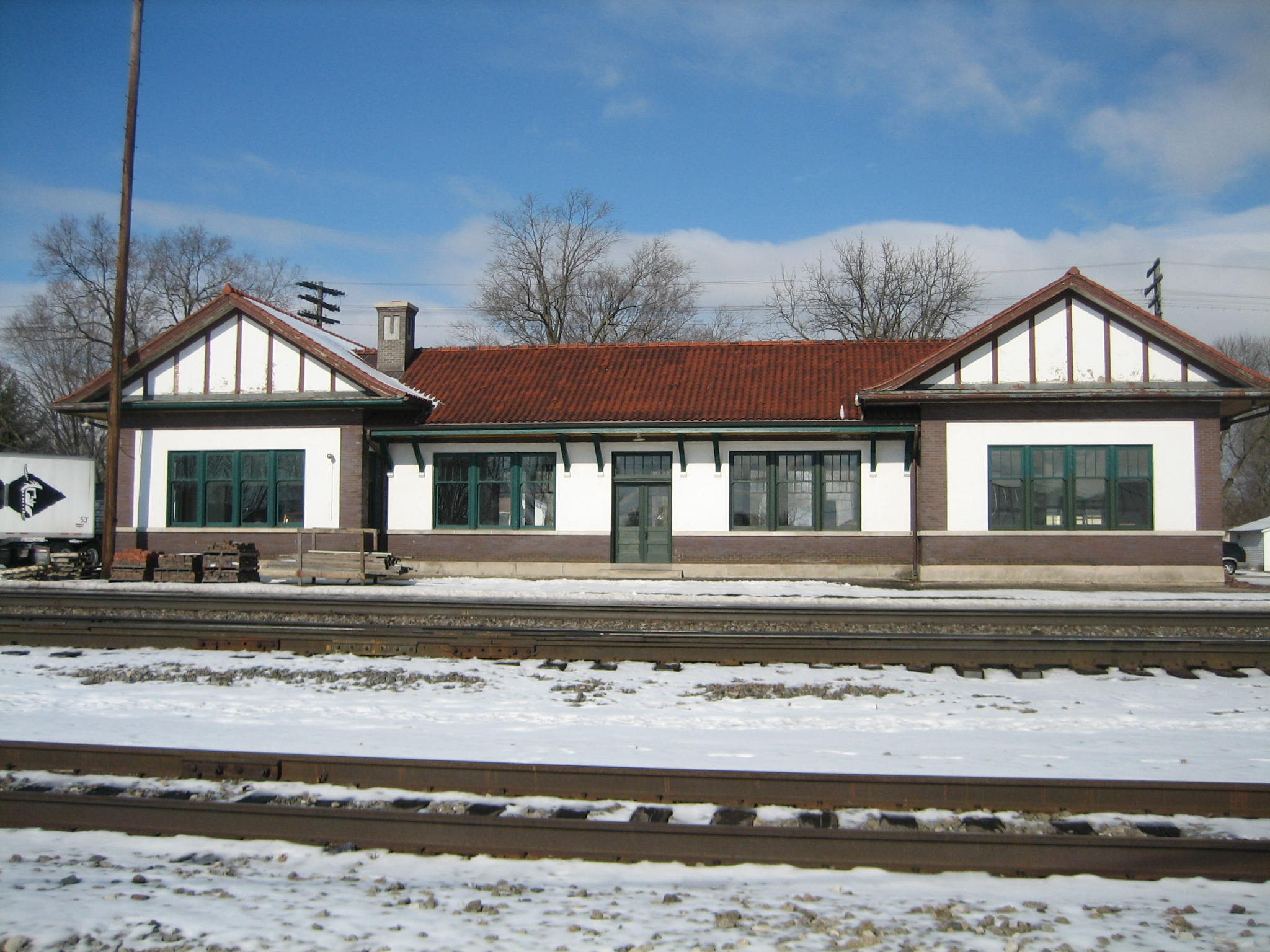
- The Oregon, Illinois Chicago, Burlington and Quincy Railroad Depot.

General information
- Location: 400 Collins St., Oregon, Illinois
- Coordinates: 42°00′05.75″N 89°19′58.70″W
- System: Former Burlington Route passenger station

History
- Opened: c. 1913
- Closed: 1971

Services
Preceding station	Burlington Route	Following station
White Pines State Park toward Minneapolis	Minneapolis – Chicago	Chana toward Chicago
Mt. Morris Terminus	Mt. Morris Branch	Terminus
- Chicago, Burlington and Quincy Railroad Depot
- U.S. National Register of Historic Places
- Location within Illinois Location within the United States
- Location: 400 Collins St., Oregon, Illinois
- Coordinates: 42°00′05.75″N 89°19′58.70″W
- Area: less than one acre
- Built: c. 1913
- Architect: T.S. Leake & Co.
- NRHP reference No.: 97000817
- Added to NRHP: July 25, 1997
Location

Oregon station is a historic train station in the Ogle County, Illinois county seat of Oregon. The depot was listed on the National Register of Historic Places in July 1997 as the Chicago, Burlington and Quincy Railroad Depot.

== Architecture ==
This former railroad depot possesses stone and brick walls. The building stands on a concrete foundation and has a ceramic tile roof. There also is some stucco work in the structure. It was constructed around 1913 and designed by the firm of T.S. Leake & Company.

== Significance ==
The Chicago, Burlington and Quincy Railroad Depot in Oregon, Illinois was listed on the National Register of Historic Places on July 25, 1997 for its significance in transportation.

== See also ==
- Chicago, Burlington and Quincy Railroad
