= Oregon, Illinois =

- City
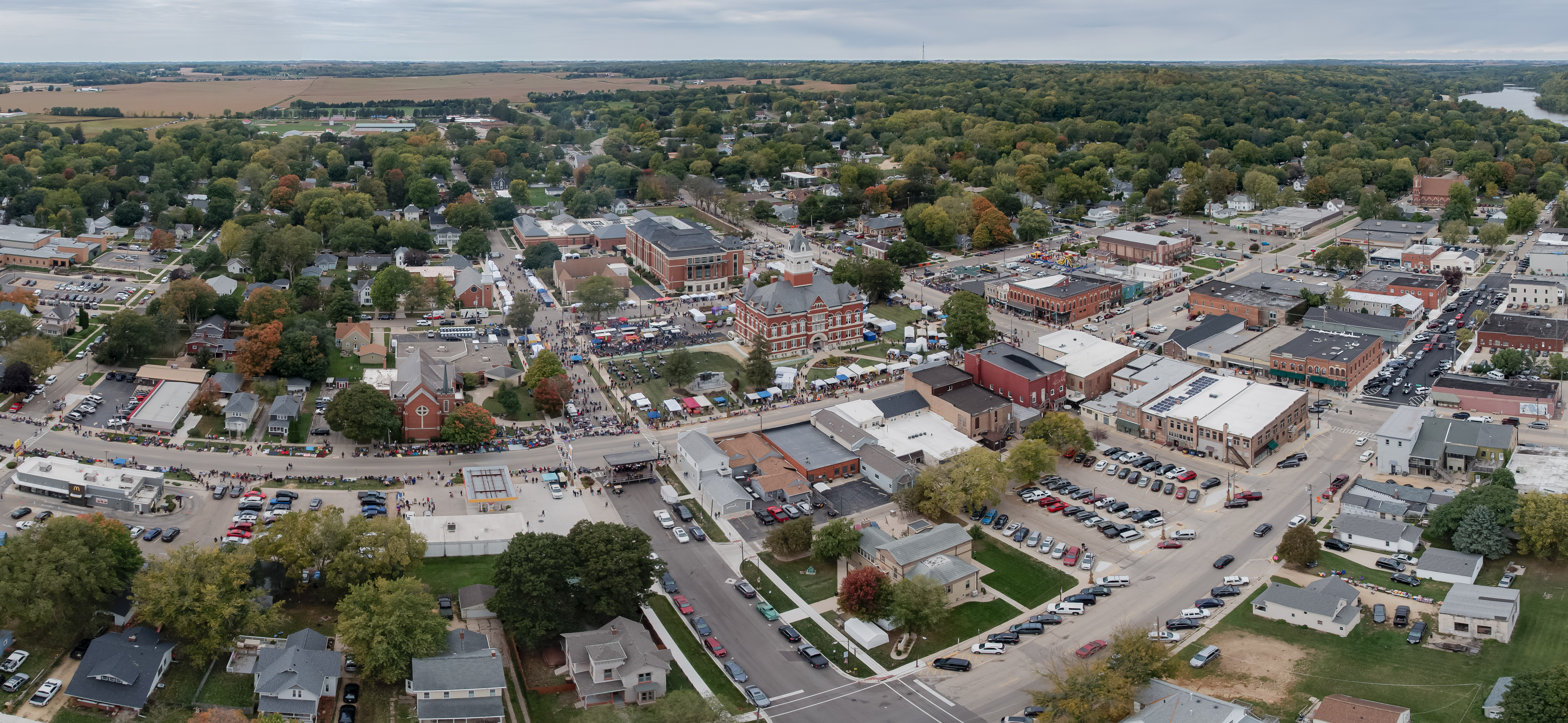
- Downtown Oregon, IL

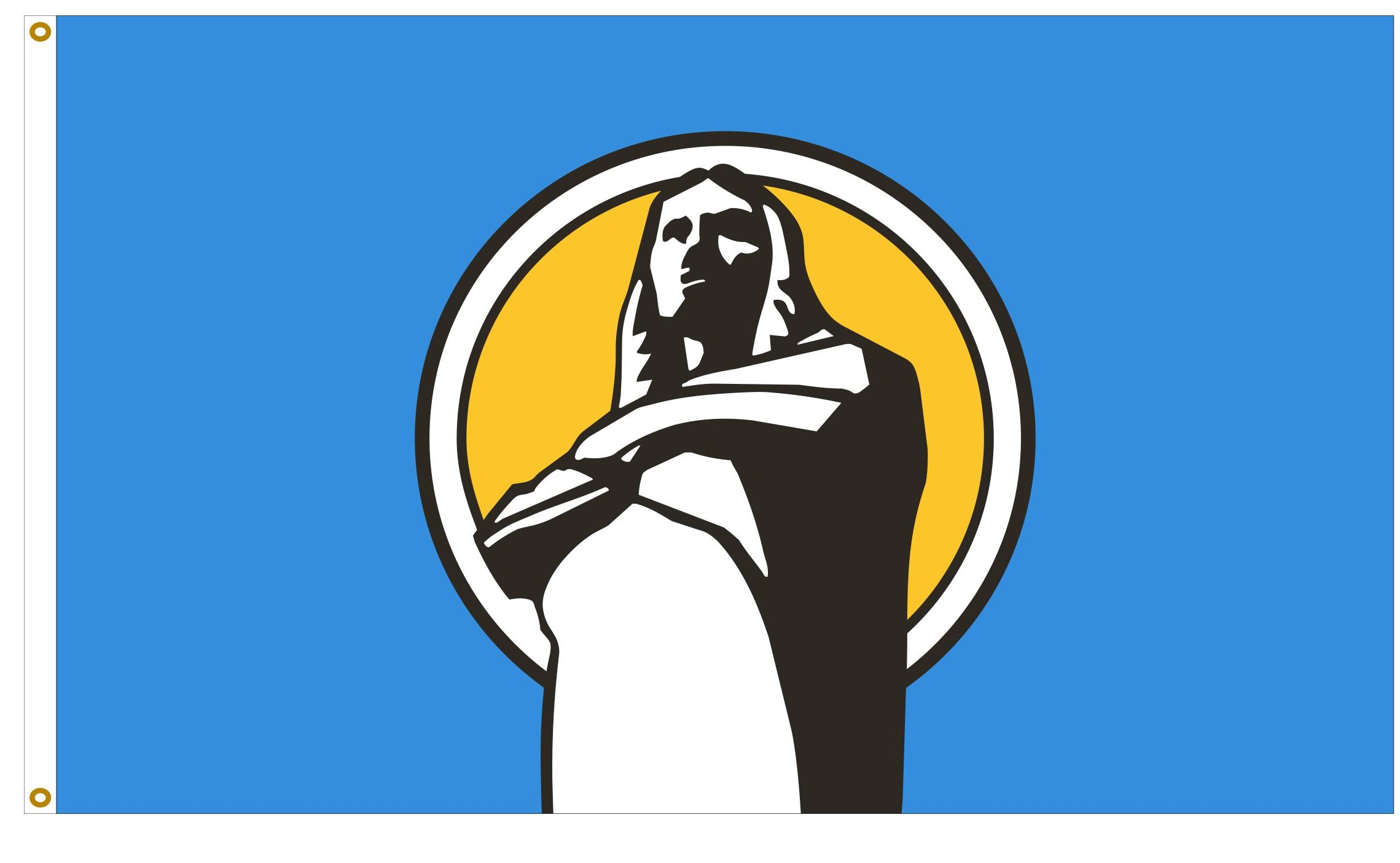
- Flag
- Motto: Gem of the Rock River Valley
- Interactive map of Oregon, Illinois
- Location within Ogle County, Illinois Location within Illinois Location within the United States
- Coordinates: 42°00′25″N 89°20′04″W
- Country: United States
- State: Illinois
- County: Ogle
- Township: Oregon-Nashua
- Founded: 1833

Area
  - Total: 2.00 sq mi (5.17 km^{2})
  - Land: 1.93 sq mi (4.99 km^{2})
  - Water: 0.069 sq mi (0.18 km^{2})
- Elevation: 709 ft (216 m)

Population (2020)
  - Total: 3,604
  - Density: 1,870/sq mi (722.1/km^{2})
- Time zone: UTC−6 (CST)
  - Summer (DST): UTC−5 (CDT)
- Postal code: 61061
- Area code: 815
- FIPS code: 17-56484
- GNIS feature ID: 2396075
- Website: cityoforegon.org

Oregon (/ˈɒrɪɡɒn/ ORR-ig-on) is a city in and the county seat of Ogle County, Illinois, United States. As of the 2020 census, Oregon had a population of 3,604.

== History ==
The land Oregon, Illinois was founded on was previously held by the Potawatomi and Winnebago Indian tribes. In fact, later, settlers discovered that the area contained a large number of Indian mounds, most 10–12 feet (3.0–3.7 m) in diameter.

Ogle County was a New England settlement. The original founders of Oregon and Rochelle consisted entirely of settlers from New England. These people were "Yankees", that is to say they were descended from the English Puritans who settled New England in the 1600s. They were part of a wave of New England farmers who headed west into what was then the wilds of the Northwest Territory during the early 1800s. Most of them arrived as a result of the completion of the Erie Canal. When they arrived in what is now Bureau County there to forest and prairie ecosystems, the New Englanders laid out farms, constructed roads, erected government buildings and established post routes. They brought with them many of their Yankee New England values, such as a passion for education, establishing many schools as well as staunch support for abolitionism. They were mostly members of the Congregationalist Church though some were Episcopalian. Culturally Bureau County, like much of northern Illinois would be culturally very continuous with early New England culture, for most of its history.

The first European to visit the land was pioneer John Phelps. Phelps first visited the area in 1829 and returned in 1833 hoping to find a suitable site to settle. Phelps found a forest and river-fed valley which impressed him enough that he built his cabin there. Other pioneers followed Phelps to this site, and Phelps helped create the first church, school, grocery store, blacksmith shop, and post office in Oregon. By December 4, 1838, due in large part to the efforts of Phelps and his brothers B.T. Phelps and G.W. Phelps, the land was claimed, subdivided and certified by the Ogle County clerk as Oregon City. The name Oregon means "River of the West".

In 1839, Oregon City was renamed Florence after a visitor compared the scenic beauty of the Rock River to the Italian city of the same name. Florence was used for only about three years when the city opted to revert to its original name, without the word "city," in 1843. By 1847 the town had a general store, sawmill, ferry, 44 households and a population of 225. The population continued to grow through the 1850s and 1860s, a fact demonstrated by the increasing number of churches in those decades and the building of a railroad in 1871. Industry followed the railroad and Oregon became home to an oatmeal mill, furniture factory, chair factory, flour mill and a foundry, Paragon Foundry, which operated until the 1960s.

The city of Oregon was first organized under an act of the Illinois General Assembly which was approved on April 1, 1869. By the 1870s the town of Oregon and nearby area was home to around 2,000 people. James Gale was elected the city's first mayor on March 21, 1870, and four other men, Christian Lehman, W.W. Bennett, George M. Dwight and George P. Jacobs, were chosen as aldermen. On March 29, 1873, the city was reorganized because of an act of the Illinois legislature which allowed the municipalities to incorporate as cities and villages. In 1920, the Oregon City Hall was constructed on the perimeter of the city's commercial district and it has been the center of city government ever since. The Ogle County Courthouse was built in 1891 on the corner of Washington Street and Fourth Street (Illinois Route 64 and Illinois Route 2).

Between 1908 and 1911, on a site just north of the city, sculptor Lorado Taft erected a 50-foot tall statue he had designed and originally named The Eternal Indian. Located on a bluff overlooking the Rock River valley, the sculpture is now known as the Black Hawk Statue, named after Black Hawk, a chief of the Sauk Indian tribe that once inhabited the area.

The city of Oregon annexed nearby Daysville, Illinois, in 1993.

== Geography ==
According to the 2010 census, Oregon has a total area of 2.028 square miles (5.25 km^{2}), of which 1.96 square miles (5.08 km^{2}) (or 96.65%) is land and 0.068 square miles (0.18 km^{2}) (or 3.35%) is water.

== Demographics ==
Historical population
Census	Pop.	Note	%±
1880	1,088		—
1890	1,566		43.9%
1900	1,577		0.7%
1910	2,180		38.2%
1920	2,227		2.2%
1930	2,376		6.7%
1940	2,825		18.9%
1950	3,205		13.5%
1960	3,732		16.4%
1970	3,539		−5.2%
1980	3,559		0.6%
1990	3,891		9.3%
2000	4,060		4.3%
2010	3,721		−8.3%
2020	3,604		−3.1%
U.S. Decennial Census

=== 2020 census ===
As of the 2020 census, the city had a population of 3,604. The median age was 43.3 years. 20.7% of residents were under the age of 18 and 22.6% of residents were 65 years of age or older. For every 100 females there were 94.5 males, and for every 100 females age 18 and over there were 94.2 males age 18 and over.

0.0% of residents lived in urban areas, while 100.0% lived in rural areas.

There were 1,647 households, of which 23.8% had children under the age of 18 living in them. Of all households, 38.4% were married-couple households, 23.4% were households with a male householder and no spouse or partner present, and 29.6% were households with a female householder and no spouse or partner present. About 38.8% of all households were made up of individuals and 17.1% had someone living alone who was 65 years of age or older.

There were 1,794 housing units, of which 8.2% were vacant. The homeowner vacancy rate was 2.9% and the rental vacancy rate was 6.0%.

Racial composition as of the 2020 census
Race	Number	Percent
White	3,299	91.5%
Black or African American	37	1.0%
American Indian and Alaska Native	13	0.4%
Asian	19	0.5%
Native Hawaiian and Other Pacific Islander	0	0.0%
Some other race	54	1.5%
Two or more races	182	5.0%
Hispanic or Latino (of any race)	160	4.4%

=== 2010 census ===
As of the 2010 census, there were 3,721 people, 1,630 households, and 941 families residing in the city. The population density was 1,998.5 inhabitants per square mile (771.6/km^{2}). There were 1,789 housing units at an average density of 880.6 per square mile (340.0/km^{2}). The racial makeup of the city was 95.9% White, .9% African American, 0.1% Native American, 0.8% Asian, 0% Pacific Islander, 1.2% from other races, and 1.1% from two or more races. Hispanic or Latino of any race were 4.2% of the population.

There were 1,630 households, out of which 22.1% had children under the age of 18 living with them, 42.3% were husband-wife families, 10.9% had a female householder with no husband present, and 42.3% were nonfamily households. 36.3% of householders lived alone, 20.1% of which were female and 16.1% male. The average household size was 2.18 and the average family size was 2.83.

In the city, the age distribution of the population shows 79.6% over the age of 18, with 19.6% aged 65 years or older. The median age was 43.5 years.

The median income for a household in the city was $47,971 and the median income for a family was $60,625. Males employed full-time had a median income of $49,958 versus $29,792 for females. The per capita income for the city was $24,832.

11.9% of all residents lived below the poverty level, including 11.6% of families with related children under the age of 18. Of families with a female householder with related children under 18 years and no husband present, 34.4% lived below the poverty line.

== Culture ==
Oregon has a rich history in the arts. As of Feb. 2021, renovations are planned for the historic building known as the Oregon Coliseum, which will create a new museum and cultural center.

The community hosts several major events a year, including the annual Autumn On Parade Candlelight Walk ShamROCK The Town and more.

=== The Arts ===
In 1898, sculptor Lorado Taft founded the Eagle's Nest Art Colony on a bluff overlooking the Rock River, north of Oregon. Taft and his art colony began to exert an influence on the city of Oregon and its culture. The artists who gathered during the summer at Eagle's Nest would leave a mark on the city below them. One result of the colony's location near Oregon was the inclusion of a second story art gallery in the Oregon Public Library when it was built in 1908. Art colony members were required to contribute to the local culture by giving art shows, lectures and plays. In 1904, Taft created The Blind and then began focusing on more monumental works including The Eternal Indian located just north of Oregon in Illinois' Lowden State Park. Several other Taft works are located in and around Oregon, including The Soldiers' Monument on the courthouse lawn.

== Education ==
It is in the Oregon Community Unit School District 220.

== Notable people ==
- Norene Arnold, All-American Girls Professional Baseball League player
- Neva Burright, Illinois harness racing driver and first woman to win a Grand Circuit race
- James H. Cartwright, Illinois Supreme Court justice
- Sherman Landers, 5th place triple jumper for the 1920 Summer Olympics Team
- Frank Loomis, gold medal and world record-setting 400m hurdler for the 1920 Summer Olympics Team
- Frank Orren Lowden, the 25th Governor of Illinois, kept an estate on the river just outside Oregon
- Mabel Newcomer, Vassar economic professor and government advisor, born in Oregon
- Fred Roat, third baseman for the Pittsburgh Alleghenys and Chicago Colts
- Lorado Taft, sculptor and friend of Frank Lloyd Wright

== See also ==
- Chicago, Burlington & Quincy Railroad Depot
- Chana School
- Lowden State Park
- Oregon Public Library
- Pinehill Inn
- The Soldiers' Monument
