= Pinehill Inn =

Historic hotel in Illinois, United States

- Pinehill
- U.S. National Register of Historic Places
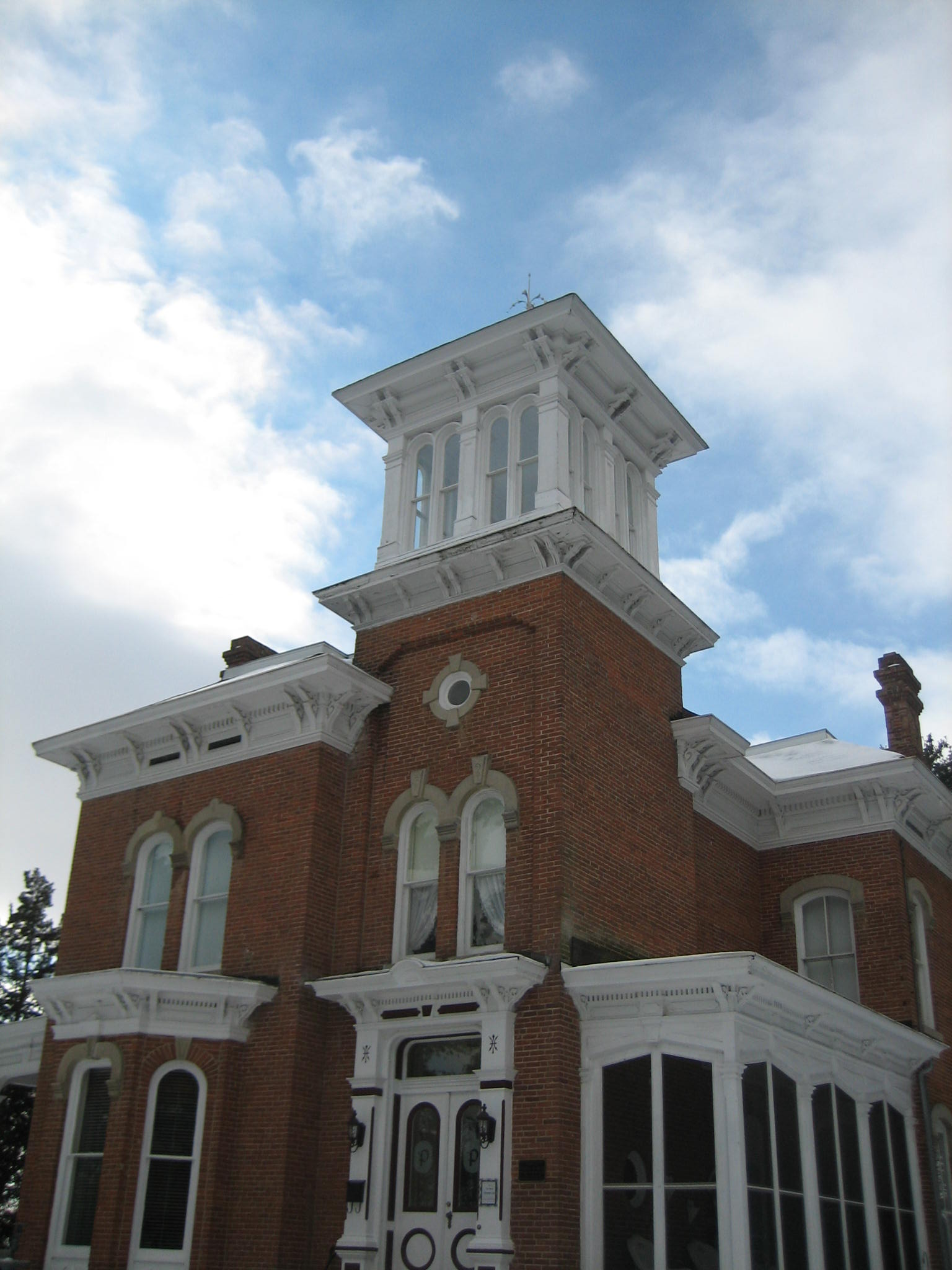
- The Italianate Pinehill Inn is dominated by its cupola.

- Location within Illinois Location within the United States
- Location: 400 Mix St., Oregon, Illinois
- Coordinates: 42°1′8.4″N 89°20′25.6″W
- Area: 5 acres (2.0 ha)
- Built: 1874
- Built by: William Judd Mix
- Architectural style: Italianate
- NRHP reference No.: 78001179

The Pinehill Inn, or just Pinehill, is a National Register of Historic Places listed house in the Ogle County, Illinois county seat of Oregon. Pinehill joined the Register in July 1978.

== Architecture ==
Pinehill was built in 1874 by William Judd Mix. The brick, wood and limestone structure stands on five acres of land and is cast in the Italianate style of architecture.

== Significance ==
Pinehill was listed on the National Register of Historic Places on September 1, 1977, for its significance in the area of architecture.
