= Mabel Newcomer =

American economist

Mabel Newcomer (2 July 1892 – 3 March 1983) was an economics professor at Vassar College from 1917 to 1957. She also taught courses in finance and corporations. Newcomer was one of two women economists taking part in the 1944 Bretton Woods Conference that established the International Monetary Fund. She was known among the Vassar economics department as the best "tax man" during her time there.

== Early life and education ==
Mabel Newcomer was born on 2 July, 1891 in Oregon, Illinois. Her father, Alphonso Newcomer, was an English professor at Stanford.

Newcomer earned her bachelor's (1913) and master's (1914)' degrees in economics from Stanford University.

== Career ==
Newcomer held a fellowship at Columbia University where she delivered work on local government and property taxation. She took a part-time teaching job at Barnard in 1916-1917. Herbert Mills, the chair of Vassar’s economics department observed her teaching. She joined Vassar’s economics department in 1917, and became a full professor there by 1926. She continued to teach at Vassar until her retirement in 1957.

=== Advisory roles in the 1920s and 1930s ===
Alongside her teaching Newcomer held a range of roles in public finance. In the 1920s she was appointed as a special investigator to the New York Joint Commission on Taxation and Retrenchment three times. She was also a special investigator for the Regional Plan of New York in 1925. In 1928, Newcomer was appointed as Robert Haig's Assistant Director at the California State Tax Commission.

In the 1930s, Newcomer served as an expert for the Office of Education for four years. She was also an investigator for President Hoover on home ownership. Throughout the 1930s she held several advisory roles for the New York State, including rural life restoration, tax law, state aid and education.

Newcomer also received a Social Science Research Council award in 1934. This funded her study of the comparative distribution of tax funds from central to local government in England and Germany.

=== World War Two ===
During World War Two, Newcomer was a consultant to the US Treasury and sat on Tac Advisory Committees, and was elected to the Board of Directors of the Tax Institute. In 1944 she was appointed as a US delegate to the Bretton Woods Conference.

==== Bretton Woods Conference ====
Mabel Newcomer was one of the American delegates to attend the Bretton Woods Conference. While at the conference, she was a member of the first Committee of the first Commission, and first Committee of the second Commission. Those Committees were responsible for deciding upon the purposes, policies, and quotas of the International Monetary Fund; and the World Bank.

She was one of two women that were present at the conference, with the other being Mrs. L.J. Gouseva from the USSR. The decision to include Newcomer as a member of the American delegation is a debated issue, as there is disagreement on why she was chosen. There are some sources which say that Eleanor Roosevelt had required there to be at least one female in the American delegation, and that she was especially chosen as she was one of the Roosevelt's neighbors and had taught Secretary of Treasury Henry Morgenthau Jr's daughter. To further support this claim are the reports that while at the Bretton Woods Conference, Newcomer spent more time going rock-climbing than in the meetings. Despite this, documents from the time also show how she was recommended by the Committee on Participation of Women in Post-War Planning with two other women as candidates for representatives of the United States at the Bretton Woods Conference, which was given to Secretary of State Cordell Hull. Furthermore, Newcomer was one of two non-governmental delegates at the conference, and of those she was the only to be in the field of academics. Despite this, the American delegation was selected so it would be easiest to convince the Presidential administration, Congress, and businessmen and scholars of the necessity of the Bretton Woods Agreements. As such, Newcomer was expected to promote the Bretton Woods Conference to her fellow women and academics.

There is not much written on Newcomer's involvement on the decision-making at the Bretton Woods Conference, except on the decision concerning the Fund Quota and Bank Subscription for the Soviet Union. In that, she believed that it was better for the United States to pay additional money for the Bank Subscription of the Soviet Union so that they did not leave the conference or weaken the agreements made at the conference. In addition to her impacts during the conference, Newcomer was also a proponent of the agreements created after the conference's passing. She made a number of speeches and writings in favor of the Bretton Woods Conference.

=== Post-war advisory work ===
From 1946 to 1947 Newcomer was the chief consultant for the Taxation and Revenue Office of the US government in Berlin. In 1950, Newcomer was due to go to Korea, then in the early stages of the Korean War to advise on fiscal policy. She instead returned to West Germany to work on assistance to German refugees.

In the late 1940s, Newcomer was appointed to the national boards of the League of Women Voters and the American Association of University Women (AAUW). She was also elected vice-president of the American Economic Association. Her post-war work in Germany prevented her becoming president of the association.

Newcomer was awarded the AAUW's Achievement Award in 1953. This was the first time a social scientist had won. Newcomer was also awarded an Honorary Degree from Russell Sage College.

== Post-retirement ==
Following her retirement, Newcomer moved to Saratoga, California in 1958. She served on the national board of the Consumer Federation of America, and continued her work with the League of Women Voters and the AAUW. She also worked for the Democratic Party and a range of local co-operatives.

In 1959 Newcomer published A History of American Women in Higher Education.

Newcomer died in San Jose, California on 3 March 1983.

== Bibliography ==
- Newcomer, Mabel (December 1921). "Physical Development of Vassar College Students, 1884-1920". Quarterly Publications of the American Statistical Association. 17 (136): 976–982. doi:10.2307/2965265. JSTOR 2965265.
- Newcomer, Mabel (1935). "Locally Shared State Revenues". National Municipal Review. 24 (12): 678–681. doi:10.1002/ncr.4110241206. ISSN 0190-3799.
- Carl Sumner Shoup; Roy Blough; Mabel Newcomer (1937). Studies in Current Tax Problems. Twentieth Century Fund., Review printed in American Political Science Review, Vol 32, no. 2.
- Newcomer, Mabel (December 1944). "Congressional Tax Policies in 1943". The American Economic Review. 34 (4): 734–756. JSTOR 1807393.
- Kirkus Review: A Century of Higher Education for Women, Harper. Archived 9, Dec 1959. Retrieved 30, Jan 2017.
