= Neva Burright =

American harness racing driver

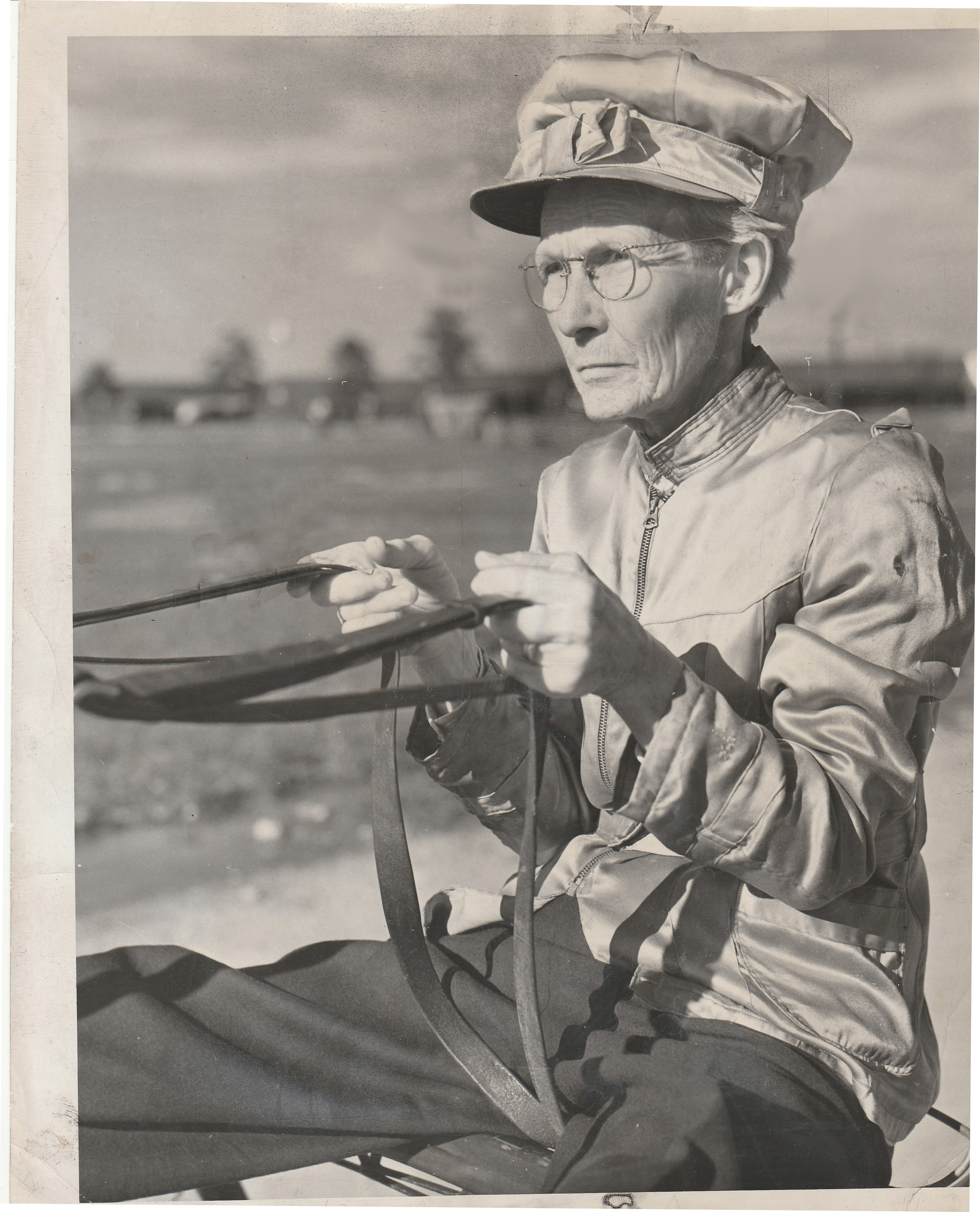
Neva "Grandma" Burright at Maywood Park, Illinois, 1946.

Neva Burright (June 10, 1883 – February 10, 1958), the daughter of John B. and Emma Gill Tomlinson, was a harness racing driver born in Mt. Carroll, Illinois.

== Personal life ==
Her first husband, Albert Eugene Holman, also a harness racing driver, died on May 22, 1927, at the age of 56. She married LaForrest "Forrest" Burright the following year and moved to Oregon, Illinois, with five of her seven children.

== Career ==
On September 23, 1943, Burright, and her bay gelding, Luckyette, faced the legendary Sep Palin and several other renowned drivers in the Grand Circuit meet at Delaware, Ohio. Palin and Provident won the first heat, while Burright and Luckyette finished in fifth place. In the second heat, Burright and Luckyette shocked the harness racing world by not only winning but setting a record for women drivers over a half-mile track with a time of 2:04 ¾.

Palin and Provident placed fifth in the second heat at Delaware. In the third heat, Burright and Luckyette finished second, while Palin and Provident placed third. Claude Isaac Shilling of Columbus, Ohio, and Conchita, a black mare, won this heat.

After the close of the third heat, all of the horses but Luckyette, Provident, and Conchita, heat winners, returned to the barn. These three horses were set to race in a fourth heat to determine the overall winner. However, when the judges called back the three heat winners for a race off, Palin didn't appear. According to Coronet magazine, “After the third race he had turned his wilting horse around and driven off the track. He unwound himself from the sulky and threw his reins to a groom. Then pointing to his exhausted horse, he ruefully told the judges, ‘If I can't beat [Neva] in a field of 13 horses, I sure can't beat her in a field of three!'”

Burright and Luckyette won the fourth heat with a time of 2:12. “Mrs. Burright and her fast-trotting gelding Luckyette really featured the afternoon’s program,” the St. Louis Post-Dispatch reported in 1948. "In fact, it has been years since we saw so many hats tossed into the air at a race track, and heard so many feminine screeches of satisfaction as when this pleasant white-haired lady demonstrated her skill and the ability of her honest gelding to such a superb degree.”

== Recognition ==
During the late 1940s, harness racing fans began to call Burright "Grandma Burright," a moniker that was perhaps first used when she raced at Roosevelt Raceway in August 1946. Burright went on to have a successful career at pari-mutuel race tracks and the Harness Racing Museum & Hall of Fame elected her as an "Immortal" in 1994.

== Death ==
Burright died on February 10, 1958, at the age of 74. Her husband, Forrest, died two days later.
