= Black Hawk Statue =

Coordinates: 42°2′03″N 89°19′59″W

- The Eternal Indian (listed as Indian Statue)
- U.S. National Register of Historic Places
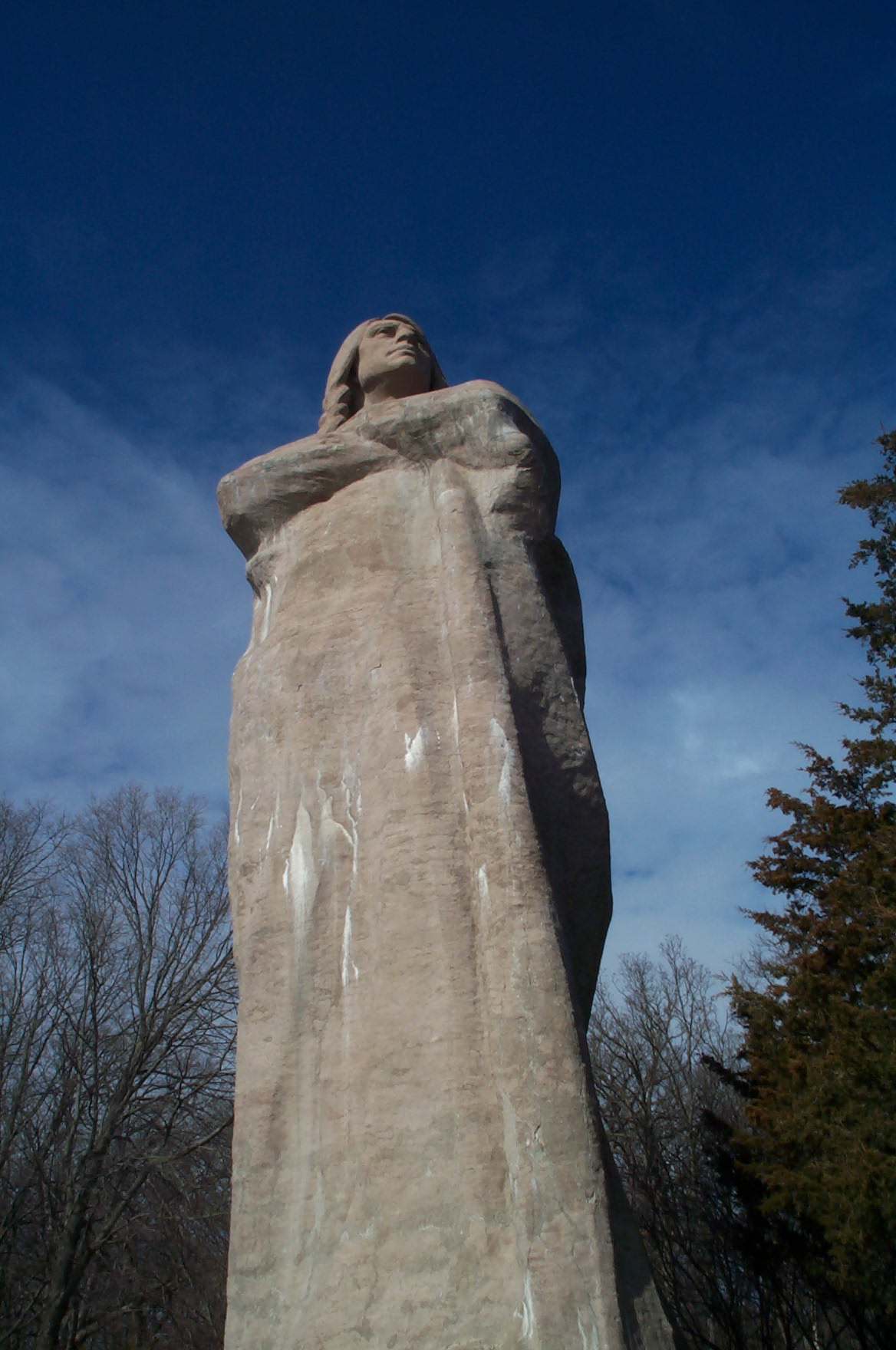
- Lorado Taft's The Eternal Indian stares solemnly across the Rock River.
- Location: Lowden State Park
- Nearest city: Oregon, Illinois
- Built: 1908-1911
- Architect: Lorado Taft (artist)
- Architectural style: Concrete monolith
- Visitation: 400,000 (2009)
- NRHP reference No.: 09000871
- Added to NRHP: November 5, 2009

The Eternal Indian, sometimes called the Black Hawk Statue, is a 48-foot (14.6 m) sculpture by Lorado Taft located in Lowden State Park, near the city of Oregon in northern Illinois. Dedicated in 1911, the statue is perched over the Rock River on a 77-foot (23.5 m) bluff overlooking the city.

The statue, according to the artist, represents the unconquerable spirit of Native Americans, using motifs from several tribal cultures. While not a portrait statue, it was in part inspired by the life of Black Hawk (1767–1838), a leader and warrior of the Sauk. In 2009, it was listed on the National Register of Historic Places.

== History ==
The statue was created by sculptor Lorado Taft, beginning in 1908. Taft at first created smaller studies of what would become the statue. The statue itself was dedicated in 1911. Taft noted at the dedication that the statue seemed to have grown out of the ground. It stands on the ground that was once home to the Eagle's Nest Art Colony, which Taft founded in 1898. Though not publicized at the time of construction, original funds were exhausted before the completion of the work and future Illinois Governor Frank Lowden had stepped in to ensure that the statue was completed and erected.

The statue was planned by Taft and several of his students and associates at the Art Colony, which is now part of the Taft Campus of Northern Illinois University and is adjacent to Lowden State Park. An original model of the statue is on permanent display at Discovery Center Museum in Rockford, Illinois. Another model is located at the Oregon Public Library in Oregon, Illinois.

== Description ==
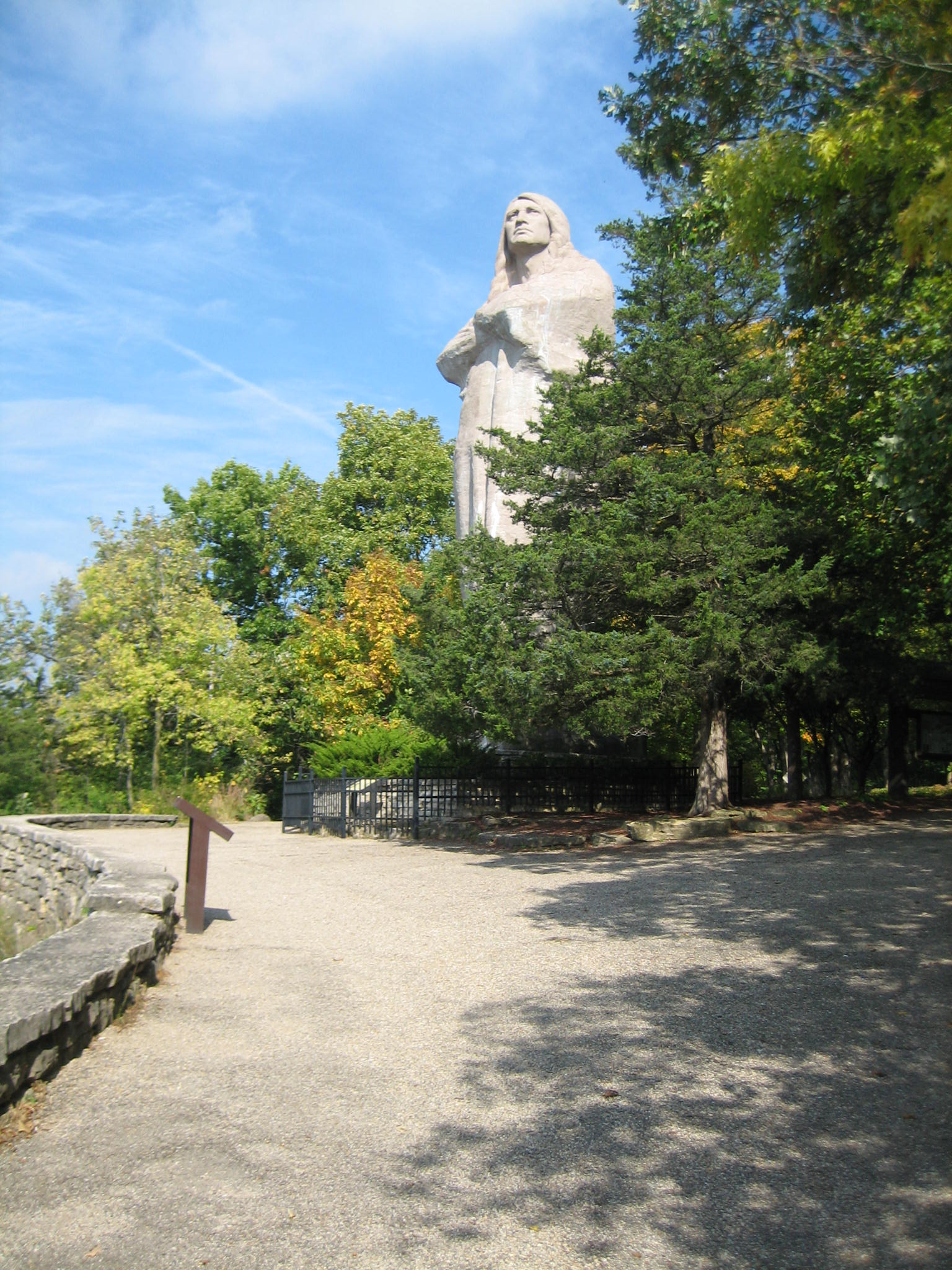
Black Hawk Statue, Lowden State Park

The statue stands on a bluff approximately 140 feet (43 m) feet above the Rock River. The 48-foot (15 m) tall statue, weighing 536,770 pounds (243,470 kg), is said to be the second largest monolithic concrete statue in the world (after Christ the Redeemer in Rio de Janeiro). It wears a long blanket and stares across the river with folded arms.

With the help of John G. Prasuhn, the young sculptor of the Chicago Art Institute, Lorado Taft created a figure almost 50 feet tall, including a six-foot base. Reinforced with iron rods, the hollow statue is eight inches to three feet thick. The interior is accessible through a door at the base, although visitors are currently not allowed inside the statue. The outer surface composed of cement, pink granite chips and screenings is three inches thick.

== Interpretation ==
At the dedication of the statue on July 1, 1911, Taft said that in the evenings he and members of the Eagle's Nest Art Colony often walked along the bluff and would stop at the statue's location to enjoy the view. Contemplation became habitual, arms folded, restful and reverent. Black Hawk came from that contemplative mood and attitude. The 48-foot (15 m) tall monolith, towering over the river, suggests an unconquered spirit through its composition blending Meskwaki, Sauk, Sioux and Mohawk cultures. Taft said the statue was inspired by the Sauk leader Black Hawk, although it is not a likeness of the chief.

== National Register listing ==
On November 5, 2009, the Black Hawk Statue was added to the U.S. National Register of Historic Places. The listing may allow the statue access to federal funding for repairs on cracks that naturally appear in its concrete surface.

== Restoration ==
Most recently, the statue restoration was completed and unwrapped in January 2020, costing just under $250,000 to restore.

The statue was in need of restoration as some of the concrete had worn away. Plans had been made by Friends of the Black Hawk Statue Committee to begin restoration work in Spring 2014. Although delayed, resumed physical integrity tests and restoration restarted in Summer 2015. Efforts to restore the statue had been halted due to a dispute between the project manager and the conservator working on the statue.

From June 2016 until June 1, 2018, the Black Hawk statue was wrapped with black tarp and ropes while it languished without further restoration. The Illinois Department of Natural Resources, owner of the statue, had no legislated funding for the project and could not proceed. In October 2017, concerned citizens organized as the Black Hawk Restoration committee. Several on the committee were on the original Friends of Black Hawk Group. It was their intention to invite IDNR to speak to the community of Oregon, Illinois, but they declined. Eventually, a meeting was held between the committee and the IDNR staff. It was agreed on March 28, 2018, that IDNR would remove the wrapping and the Black Hawk Restoration Committee would begin fundraising. On June 1, 2018, the wrapping was removed from the statue. On May 10, 2018, the Legislature of the State of Illinois passed a capital budget which funded a grant of $350,000 to IDNR. It was estimated that further repairs could cost up to $660,000. and that the grant to IDNR required matching funds from the public sector. The Black Hawk Restoration Committee agreed to take on the task. As of November 2018, nearly $600,000 had been raised, with plans for completing the restoration by August 2019. The statue was again covered with a protective wrapping. As of December 2019 the restoration was nearly complete.

== See also ==
- List of the tallest statues in the United States
