= Lowden State Park =

State park in Ogle County, Illinois

- IUCN category III (natural monument or feature)
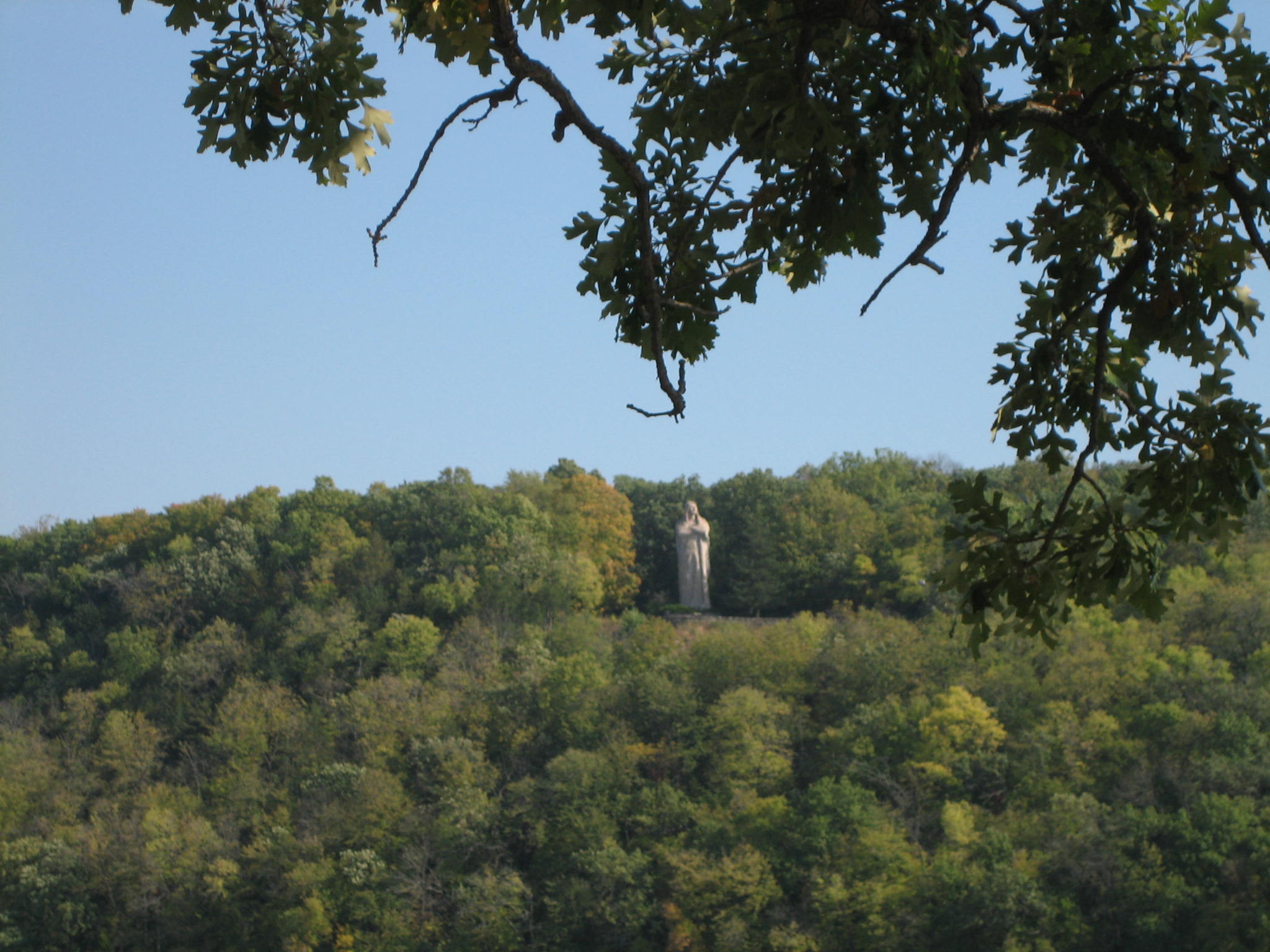
- Black Hawk Statue viewed from Illinois Route 2
- Interactive map of Lowden State Park
- Location: Ogle County, Illinois, USA
- Nearest city: Oregon, Illinois
- Coordinates: 42°01′56″N 89°19′35″W
- Area: 207 acres (84 ha)
- Established: 1945
- Governing body: Illinois Department of Natural Resources

Lowden State Park is an Illinois state park on 207 acres (84 ha) in Ogle County, Illinois, United States. It is named for Governor Frank Orren Lowden, who served from 1917 to 1921, and is home to The Eternal Indian, a statue by Lorado Taft. Along with eleven other parks, it was briefly closed after budget cuts in 2008.

== History ==
425 million years ago, the Trenton Sea formed the rock base of the area around Lowden State Park, stretching north into Wisconsin. The Galena-Platteville Aquifer's spring water in the area travels south from Platteville and Glenwood, Wisconsin through layers of rocks into northern Illinois. Native Americans inhabited the region prior to European settlement and they kept the trees burnt off the stone bluffs to keep their roots from splitting the rock. When the earliest European settlers arrived they found groves of trees in the hollows, ravines, and lowlands near the river, which was where they built their first homes.

Chicago attorney and patron of the arts Wallace Heckman purchased the land that would eventually become the Eagle's Nest Colony and Lowden State Park in 1898. American sculptor Lorado Taft and his peers were searching for a location for their summer retreat, first locating in Bass Lake, Indiana and then looking toward Wisconsin, but Heckman invited the group to his home in Ogle County for the Fourth of July. Heckman offered to let the group set up camp there and they signed a lease for the site the same week. The Eagle's Nest Art Colony was then founded in 1898 by Taft on the bluffs flanking the east bank of the Rock River, overlooking Oregon, Illinois. The colony was populated by Chicago artists, all members of the Chicago Art Institute or the University of Chicago art department. The colony remained at the site from its founding until 1942, six years after Taft's death.

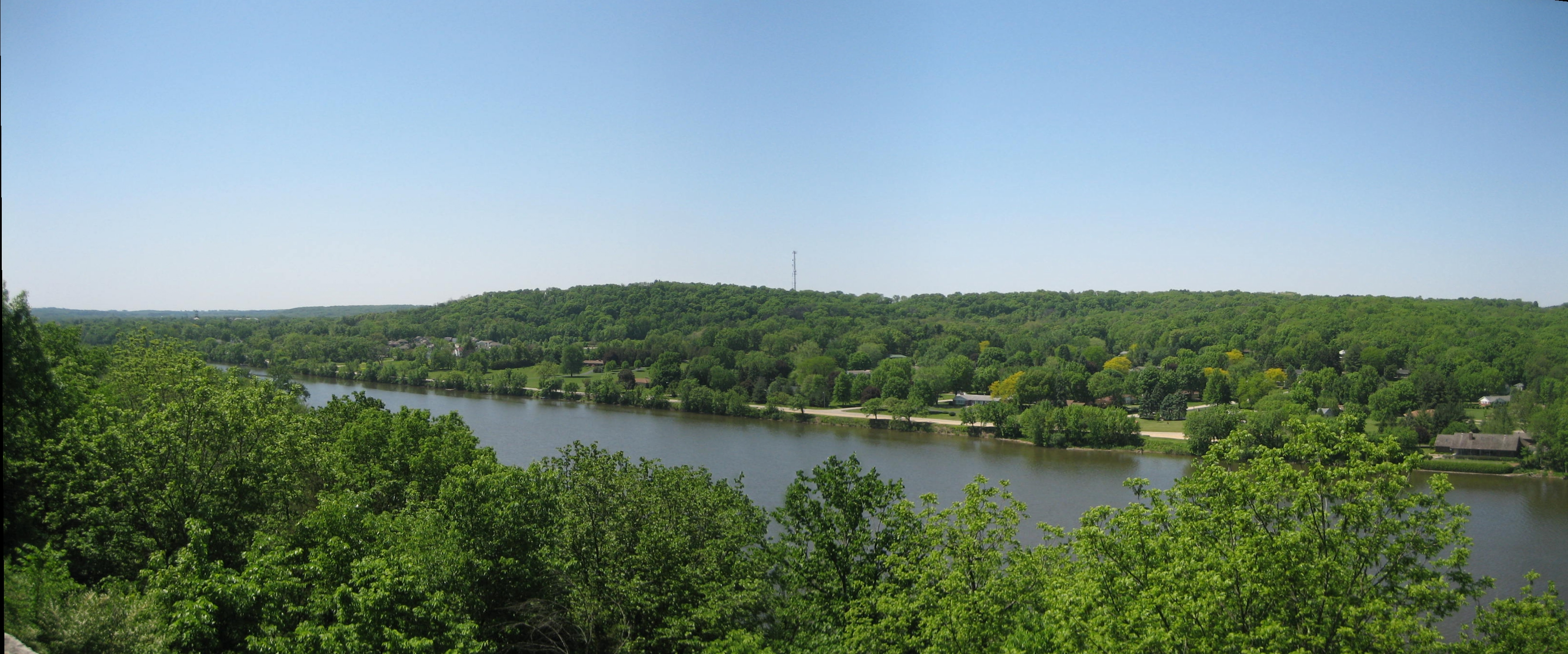
A panoramic view from Eagle's Nest Bluff overlooking the Rock River, 77 feet (23 m) below.

Lowden State Park was founded in 1945, a few years after the Eagle's Nest Art Colony vacated the land. In 1943, the year former Illinois Governor Frank Lowden died, the Illinois House of Representatives Appreciation Committee authorized the purchase of 273 acres (110 ha) as a memorial. The appropriation of $25,000 was matched by the citizens of Oregon, Illinois and the Illinois Department of Natural Resources (IDNR) to help purchase the former Eagle's Nest Art Colony. The 63rd Illinois General Assembly designated the 273-acre (110 ha) tract, including the former art colony, Lowden Memorial State Park in 1945.

On August 7, 1951, Illinois Governor Adlai E. Stevenson II signed a bill into law which transferred ownership of a 66-acre (27 ha) section of the park to Northern Illinois Teachers College, now Northern Illinois University (NIU). The land encompassed the former Eagle's Nest Art Colony and its buildings, the Black Hawk Statue was not included in the land transfer. The area is now known as the NIU Lorado Taft Field Campus.

== 2008 closing ==
Lowden State Park was one of eleven state parks slated to close indefinitely on November 1, 2008, due to budget cuts by former Illinois governor Rod Blagojevich. After delay, which restored funding for some of the parks, a proposal to close seven state parks and a dozen state historic sites, including Lowden, went ahead on November 30, 2008. After the impeachment of Illinois Governor Blagojevich, new governor Pat Quinn reopened the closed state parks in February 2009.

== The Eternal Indian ==
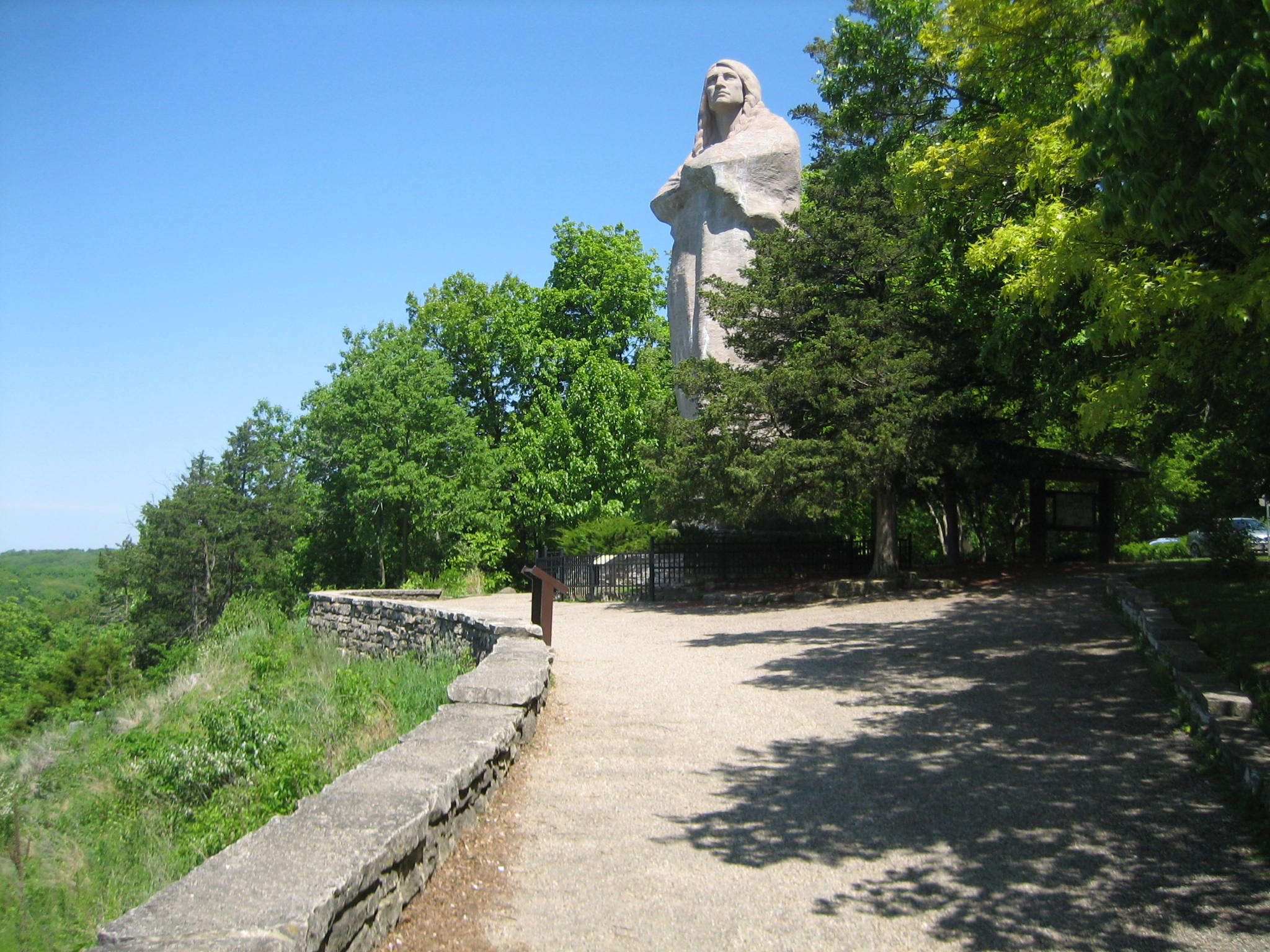
Lorado Taft's sculpture The Eternal Indian.

The Eternal Indian, unofficially known as the Black Hawk Statue, was created by Lorado Taft and John G. Prasuhn, beginning in 1908. Taft at first created smaller studies of what would become the statue. When it was dedicated in 1911, he noted it seemed to have grown out of the ground. It stands on the ground that was once home to the Eagle's Nest Art Colony, which Taft founded in 1898. The statue stands 125 feet (38 m) above the Rock River, though its height only accounts for 48 feet (15 m) of that. Black Hawk weighs 536,770 pounds (243.47 t) and is said to be the second largest concrete monolithic statue in the world. Taft said the statue was inspired by the Sac leader Black Hawk, although it is not a likeness of the chief.

Though never publicized at the time of construction, when funds were exhausted the park's namesake, Frank Lowden had stepped in to ensure the completion of Black Hawk was financially possible.

The statue is deteriorating and was wrapped for protection in the 2010s. Restoration fundraising and proceedings are both at issue. A community meeting in early 2018 brought interested agencies and community residents together to discuss solutions; Illinois Conservation Foundation remains optimistic that the statue will be repaired when “1 or 2 charitable angels” appear. The state's Department of Natural Resources has not offered any funds; the loss of the statue for viewing has led to a lower number of visitors to the park.

== Activities ==
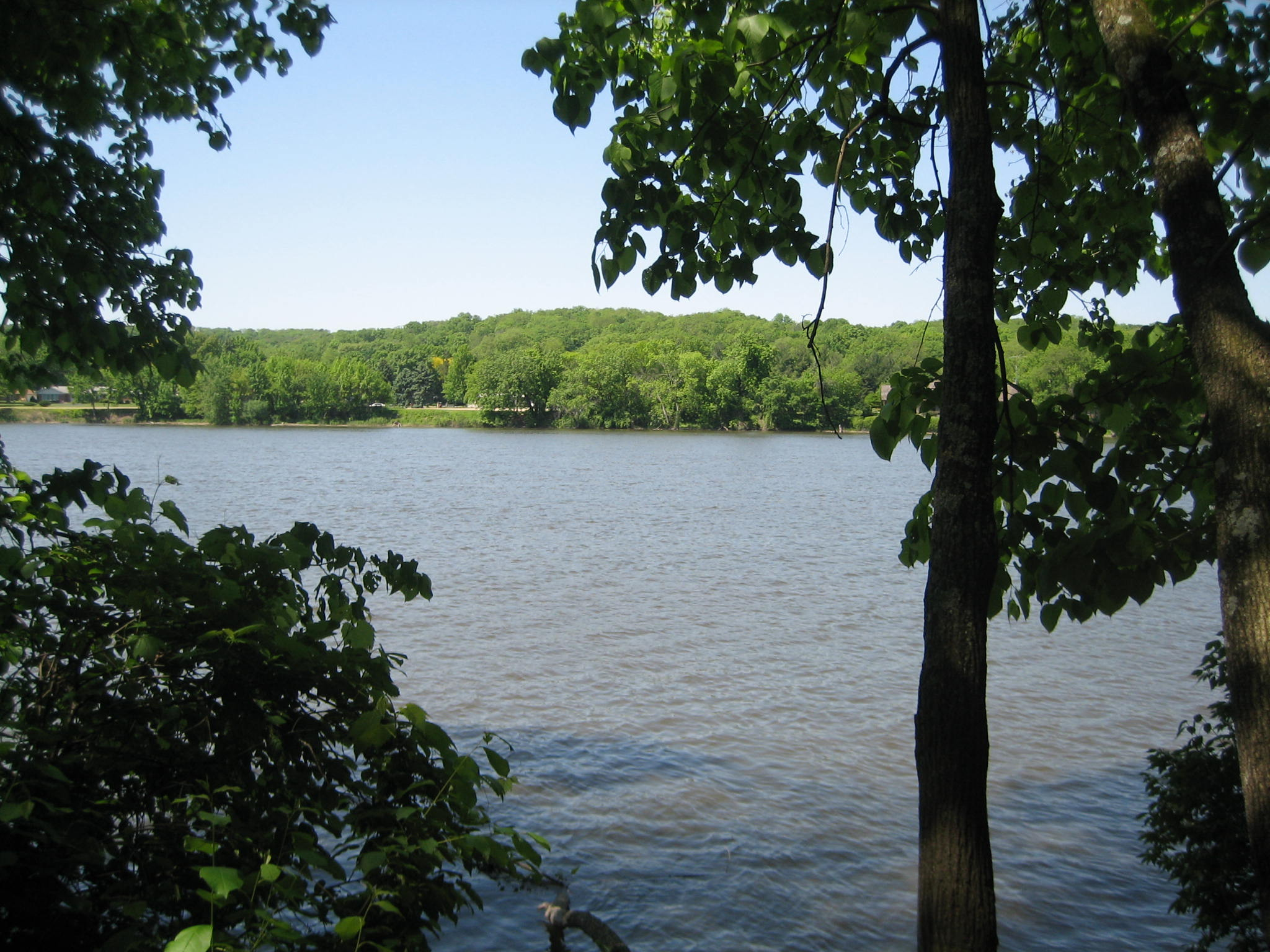
The Rock River from its banks at Lowden State Park

Aside from Taft's colossal statue the 207-acre (84 ha) park has scenic views of the Rock River beneath the bluffs. Picnic areas, drinking water and park stoves are among the amenities generally found in public state parks that are found at Lowden. Hiking is another activity available at the park, four miles (6 km) of "moderately difficult" trails wind through the natural features at Lowden. Campsites are available for individuals and groups. The sites have limited electricity, and access to a shower building and a sanitary dumping station. Camping permits must be obtained from IDNR staff at the park.

The Black Hawk Statue overlooks the scenic Rock River which flows through 34 miles (55 km) of Ogle County with an average mid-summer depth of three feet. Aquatic recreation at Lowden State Park is limited to fishing, water skiing, and boating along the Rock River. The boat ramp at Lowden State Park is located about one mile (1.6 km) downstream from the monolithic statue. The park is just upstream from the Oregon Dam, which, like all dams along the Rock River, is dangerous to boaters because of the backwash or hydraulic that forms below the dam.
