= Derinda Township, Illinois =

Derinda Township
- Township
- Location in Jo Daviess County

- Jo Daviess County's location in Illinois
- Coordinates: 42°14′22″N 90°09′24″W
- Country: United States
- State: Illinois
- County: Jo Daviess
- Established: November 2, 1852

Area
  - Total: 37.02 sq mi (95.9 km^{2})
  - Land: 36.96 sq mi (95.7 km^{2})
  - Water: 0.06 sq mi (0.16 km^{2}) 0.16%
- Elevation: 702 ft (214 m)

Population (2020)
  - Total: 274
  - Density: 7.41/sq mi (2.86/km^{2})
- Time zone: UTC-6 (CST)
  - Summer (DST): UTC-5 (CDT)
- ZIP codes: 61028, 61041, 61074, 61085
- FIPS code: 17-085-19551

Derinda Township is one of 23 townships in Jo Daviess County, Illinois, United States. As of the 2020 census, its population was 274 and it contained 176 housing units.

Derinda Township was named in the 1850s for Derinda Barr, the wife of an early settler.

== Geography ==
According to the 2021 census gazetteer files, Derinda Township has a total area of 37.02 square miles (95.88 km^{2}), of which 36.96 square miles (95.73 km^{2}) (or 99.84%) is land and 0.06 square miles (0.16 km^{2}) (or 0.16%) is water.

=== Adjacent townships ===
- Woodbine Township (north)
- Stockton Township (northeast)
- Pleasant Valley Township (east)
- Woodland Township, Carroll County (southeast)
- Washington Township, Carroll County (south)
- Hanover Township (west)
- Elizabeth Township (northwest)

=== Cemeteries ===
The township contains four cemeteries, Albright/Fehler, Massbach/St. John's Evangelical Lutheran, Trinity Lutheran/Derinda Center, and Morrison/Derinda Methodist.

== Demographics ==
As of the 2020 census there were 274 people, 106 households, and 60 families residing in the township. The population density was 7.40 inhabitants per square mile (2.86/km^{2}). There were 176 housing units at an average density of 4.75 per square mile (1.83/km^{2}). The racial makeup of the township was 96.72% White, 0.36% African American, 0.00% Native American, 0.00% Asian, 0.00% Pacific Islander, 0.00% from other races, and 2.92% from two or more races. Hispanic or Latino of any race were 0.00% of the population.

There were 106 households, out of which 12.30% had children under the age of 18 living with them, 56.60% were married couples living together, 0.00% had a female householder with no spouse present, and 43.40% were non-families. 36.80% of all households were made up of individuals, and 27.40% had someone living alone who was 65 years of age or older. The average household size was 1.87 and the average family size was 2.38.

The township's age distribution consisted of 10.1% under the age of 18, 6.6% from 18 to 24, 0% from 25 to 44, 56.6% from 45 to 64, and 26.8% who were 65 years of age or older. The median age was 60.8 years. For every 100 females, there were 191.2 males. For every 100 females age 18 and over, there were 161.8 males.

The median income for a household in the township was $68,250, and the median income for a family was $69,333. Males had a median income of $52,500 versus $20,781 for females. The per capita income for the township was $38,165. About 0.0% of families and 5.1% of the population were below the poverty line, including 0.0% of those under age 18 and 0.0% of those age 65 or over.

Historical population
Census	Pop.	Note	%±
2000	354		—
2010	321		−9.3%
2020	274		−14.6%
U.S. Decennial Census

== School districts ==
- River Ridge Community Unit School District 210
- Stockton Community Unit School District 206
- West Carroll Community Unit School District 314

== Political districts ==
- Illinois' 16th congressional district
- State House District 89
- State Senate District 45
