= Rice Township, Illinois =

Rice Township
- Township
- Location in Jo Daviess County

- Jo Daviess County's location in Illinois
- Coordinates: 42°19′51″N 90°22′55″W
- Country: United States
- State: Illinois
- County: Jo Daviess
- Established: February 22, 1859

Government
  - Supervisor: Duane Dehnicke

Area
  - Total: 29.68 sq mi (76.9 km^{2})
  - Land: 24.40 sq mi (63.2 km^{2})
  - Water: 5.28 sq mi (13.7 km^{2}) 17.79%
- Elevation: 686 ft (209 m)

Population (2020)
  - Total: 348
  - Density: 14.3/sq mi (5.51/km^{2})
- Time zone: UTC-6 (CST)
  - Summer (DST): UTC-5 (CDT)
- ZIP codes: 61036, 61041
- FIPS code: 17-085-63472

Rice Township is one of 23 townships in Jo Daviess County, Illinois, United States. As of the 2020 census, its population was 348 and it contained 271 housing units. It was formed as Washington Township from East Galena Township on February 22, 1859; its name changed to Rice Township on June 16, 1859.

== Geography ==
According to the 2021 census gazetteer files, Rice Township has a total area of 29.68 square miles (76.87 km^{2}), of which 24.40 square miles (63.20 km^{2}) (or 82.21%) is land and 5.28 square miles (13.68 km^{2}) (or 17.79%) is water.

=== Cemeteries ===
The township contains Prospect Hill Methodist Episcopalian Cemetery.

=== Airports and landing strips ===
- Merkle Engineers Airport and Apple Orchard

=== Landmarks and recreation ===
- Chestnut Mountain Ski Resort
- Spratts Lake

== Demographics ==
As of the 2020 census there were 348 people, 213 households, and 153 families residing in the township. The population density was 11.73 inhabitants per square mile (4.53/km^{2}). There were 271 housing units at an average density of 9.13 per square mile (3.53/km^{2}). The racial makeup of the township was 94.25% White, 0.29% African American, 0.00% Native American, 0.00% Asian, 0.00% Pacific Islander, 1.44% from other races, and 4.02% from two or more races. Hispanic or Latino people of any race were 5.75% of the population.

There were 213 households, out of which 29.10% had children under the age of 18 living with them, 71.83% were married couples living together, 0.00% had a female householder with no spouse present, and 28.17% were non-families. 28.20% of all households were made up of individuals, and 13.60% had someone living alone who was 65 years of age or older. The average household size was 2.40 and the average family size was 2.95.

The township's age distribution consisted of 27.0% under the age of 18, 1.4% from 18 to 24, 27% from 25 to 44, 21.4% from 45 to 64, and 23.2% who were 65 years of age or older. The median age was 40.7 years. For every 100 females, there were 109.0 males. For every 100 females age 18 and over, there were 132.3 males.

The median income for a household in the township was $93,750, and the median income for a family was $106,792. Males had a median income of $41,188 versus $76,417 for females. The per capita income for the township was $41,458. About 14.4% of families and 8.2% of the population were below the poverty line, including none of those under age 18 and 26.1% of those age 65 or over.

Historical population
Census	Pop.	Note	%±
2000	306		—
2010	338		10.5%
2020	348		3.0%
U.S. Decennial Census

== School districts ==
- Galena Unit School District 120
- River Ridge Community Unit School District 210

== Political districts ==
- Illinois' 16th congressional district
- State House District 89
- State Senate District 45
