= Schapville, Illinois =

- Unincorporated community
- Location within Illinois Location within the United States
- Coordinates: 42°23′49″N 90°12′19″W
- Country: United States
- State: Illinois
- County: Jo Daviess
- Elevation: 846 ft (258 m)
- Time zone: UTC-6 (Central (CST))
  - Summer (DST): UTC-5 (CDT)
- Zip: 61076
- Area codes: 815 and 779
- GNIS feature ID: 418074

Schapville is an unincorporated community located west of Apple Canyon Lake and east of the Galena Territory in Thompson Township, Jo Daviess County, Illinois, United States.

== History ==
Schapville was named after Anton Schap. He was born John Anton Christian Schap on September 12, 1842, in Oberneubrunn, Hildburghausen, Saxony (modern day Germany). He was the fifth son born to Jacob and Catherine (Witter) Schap. In the spring of 1867, Anton settled with his wife, Marie (Winter), and newborn son in the vicinity of Mill Creek, Thompson Township. Schap established a blacksmith shop on his farm around which the village grew.
