= Hanover Township, Nebraska =

Hanover Township, Nebraska may refer to the following places:

- Hanover Township, Adams County, Nebraska
- Hanover Township, Gage County, Nebraska

== See also ==
- Hanover Township (disambiguation)
