= Elizabeth Township, Illinois =

Elizabeth Township
- Township
- Location in Jo Daviess County

- Jo Daviess County's location in Illinois
- Coordinates: 42°20′02″N 90°16′29″W
- Country: United States
- State: Illinois
- County: Jo Daviess
- Established: November 2, 1852

Government
  - Supervisor: Vincent V. Velely

Area
  - Total: 36.89 sq mi (95.5 km^{2})
  - Land: 36.88 sq mi (95.5 km^{2})
  - Water: 0.01 sq mi (0.026 km^{2}) 0.02%
- Elevation: 965 ft (294 m)

Population (2020)
  - Total: 1,008
  - Density: 27.33/sq mi (10.55/km^{2})
- Time zone: UTC-6 (CST)
  - Summer (DST): UTC-5 (CDT)
- ZIP codes: 61028, 61036, 61041
- FIPS code: 17-085-23178

Elizabeth Township is one of 23 townships in Jo Daviess County, Illinois, United States. As of the 2020 census, its population was 1,008 and it contained 547 housing units.

== Geography ==
According to the 2021 census gazetteer files, Elizabeth Township has a total area of 36.89 square miles (95.54 km^{2}), of which 36.88 square miles (95.52 km^{2}) (or 99.98%) is land and 0.01 square miles (0.03 km^{2}) (or 0.02%) is water.

=== Cities, towns, villages ===
- Village of Elizabeth

=== Cemeteries ===
The township contains these three cemeteries:

- Log Church
- Saint Marys
- Weston

=== Major highways ===
- U.S. Route 20 east towards Woodbine and northwest towards Galena
- Illinois Route 84 south towards Hanover and northwest towards Galena (concurrent with U.S. Route 20)

=== Landmarks ===
- Long Hollow Scenic Overlook (Illinois Department of Transportation)

== Demographics ==
As of the 2020 census there were 1,008 people, 594 households, and 298 families residing in the township. The population density was 27.32 inhabitants per square mile (10.55/km^{2}). There were 547 housing units at an average density of 14.83 per square mile (5.73/km^{2}). The racial makeup of the township was 95.14% White, 0.30% African American, 0.30% Native American, 0.20% Asian, 0.00% Pacific Islander, 0.60% from other races, and 3.47% from two or more races. Hispanic or Latino people of any race were 2.58% of the population.

There were 594 households, out of which 21.40% had children under the age of 18 living with them, 37.21% were married couples living together, 6.06% had a female householder with no spouse present, and 49.83% were non-families. 42.10% of all households were made up of individuals, and 25.10% had someone living alone who was 65 years of age or older. The average household size was 1.82 and the average family size was 2.40.

The township's age distribution consisted of 14.5% under the age of 18, 7.6% from 18 to 24, 27.9% from 25 to 44, 19.7% from 45 to 64, and 30.4% who were 65 years of age or older. The median age was 45.0 years. For every 100 females, there were 97.5 males. For every 100 females age 18 and over, there were 94.1 males.

The median income for a household in the township was $46,625, and the median income for a family was $76,548. Males had a median income of $39,926 versus $31,974 for females. The per capita income for the township was $41,265. About 2.7% of families and 8.5% of the population were below the poverty line, including 4.4% of those under age 18 and 13.5% of those age 65 or over.

Historical population
Census	Pop.	Note	%±
2000	973		—
2010	1,111		14.2%
2020	1,008		−9.3%
U.S. Decennial Census

== School districts ==
- River Ridge Community Unit School District 210

== Political districts ==
- Illinois' 16th congressional district
- State House District 89
- State Senate District 45
