= Hanover Township, Illinois =

Hanover Township may refer to one of the following places in the State of Illinois:

- Hanover Township, Cook County, Illinois
- Hanover Township, Jo Daviess County, Illinois

See also

- Hanover Township (disambiguation)
