= Thompson Township, Illinois =

Thompson Township
- Township
- Location in Jo Daviess County

- Jo Daviess County's location in Illinois
- Coordinates: 42°24′52″N 90°09′48″W
- Country: United States
- State: Illinois
- County: Jo Daviess
- Established: November 2, 1852

Government
  - Supervisor: John Diehl

Area
  - Total: 36.87 sq mi (95.5 km^{2})
  - Land: 36.21 sq mi (93.8 km^{2})
  - Water: 0.66 sq mi (1.7 km^{2}) 1.78%
- Elevation: 732 ft (223 m)

Population (2020)
  - Total: 832
  - Density: 23.0/sq mi (8.87/km^{2})
- Time zone: UTC-6 (CST)
  - Summer (DST): UTC-5 (CDT)
- ZIP codes: 61001, 61028, 61075, 61085
- FIPS code: 17-085-75146

Thompson Township is one of 23 townships in Jo Daviess County, Illinois, United States. As of the 2020 census, its population was 832 and it contained 1,053 housing units.

== Geography ==
According to the 2021 census gazetteer files, Thompson Township has a total area of 36.87 square miles (95.49 km^{2}), of which 36.21 square miles (93.78 km^{2}) (or 98.22%) is land and 0.66 square miles (1.71 km^{2}) (or 1.78%) is water.

=== Cities, towns, villages ===
- Unincorporated community of Apple Canyon Lake
- Unincorporated community of Schapville

=== Cemeteries ===
The township contains:

- Schapville Presbyterian Cemetery, within Schapville
- Thompson Cemetery, rural area south of Townsend Road, just east of where the Apple River crosses Townsend Road

=== Airports and landing strips ===
- Apple Canyon Lake Airport (historical)

== Demographics ==
As of the 2020 census there were 832 people, 408 households, and 303 families residing in the township. The population density was 22.57 inhabitants per square mile (8.71/km^{2}). There were 1,053 housing units at an average density of 28.56 per square mile (11.03/km^{2}). The racial makeup of the township was 97.00% White, 0.36% African American, 0.36% Native American, 0.00% Asian, 0.00% Pacific Islander, 0.12% from other races, and 2.16% from two or more races. Hispanic or Latino people of any race were 1.80% of the population.

There were 408 households, out of which 29.70% had children under the age of 18 living with them, 53.43% were married couples living together, 19.85% had a female householder with no spouse present, and 25.74% were non-families. 25.50% of all households were made up of individuals, and 18.90% had someone living alone who was 65 years of age or older. The average household size was 2.09 and the average family size was 2.45.

The township's age distribution consisted of 16.5% under the age of 18, 7.4% from 18 to 24, 14.4% from 25 to 44, 27.4% from 45 to 64, and 34.3% who were 65 years of age or older. The median age was 55.0 years. For every 100 females, there were 78.8 males. For every 100 females age 18 and over, there were 90.4 males.

The median income for a household in the township was $80,833, and the median income for a family was $83,250. Males had a median income of $46,250 versus $16,759 for females. The per capita income for the township was $40,887. About 10.2% of families and 14.3% of the population were below the poverty line, including 25.5% of those under age 18 and 1.0% of those age 65 or over.

Historical population
Census	Pop.	Note	%±
2000	609		—
2010	841		38.1%
2020	832		−1.1%
U.S. Decennial Census

== School districts ==
- River Ridge Community Unit School District 210
- Scales Mound Community Unit School District 211
- Stockton Community Unit School District 206
- Warren Community Unit School District 205

== Political districts ==
- Illinois' 17th congressional district
- State House District 89
- State Senate District 45
