= Dutch Hollow =

Dutch Hollow may refer to:

- Dutch Hollow, a 2015 film
- Dutch Hollow (Shannon County, Missouri), a valley in Missouri
- Dutch Hollow Lake, a lake in Wisconsin
