= La Valle (town), Wisconsin =

La Valle, Wisconsin
- Town of La Valle
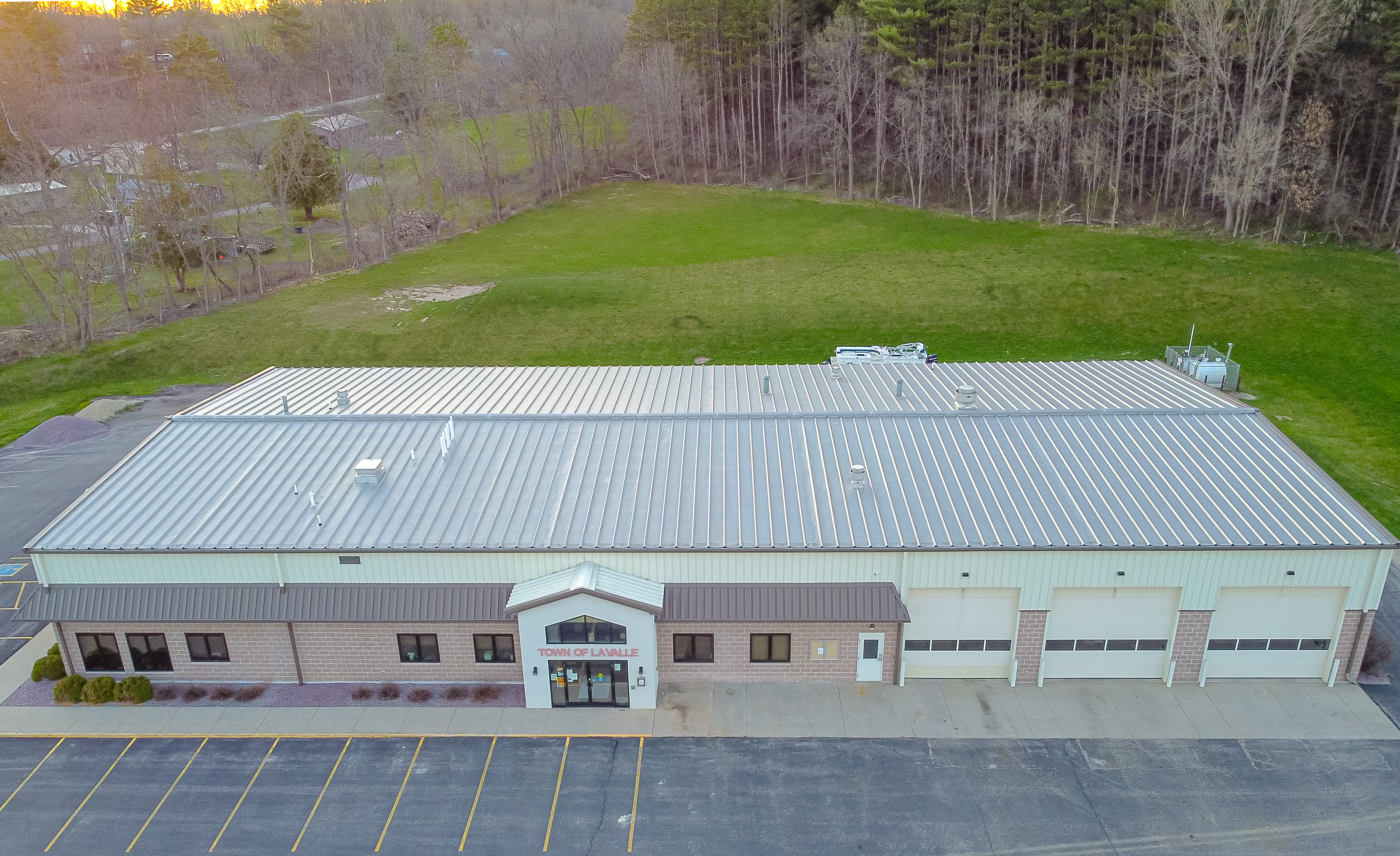
- La Valle Town Hall

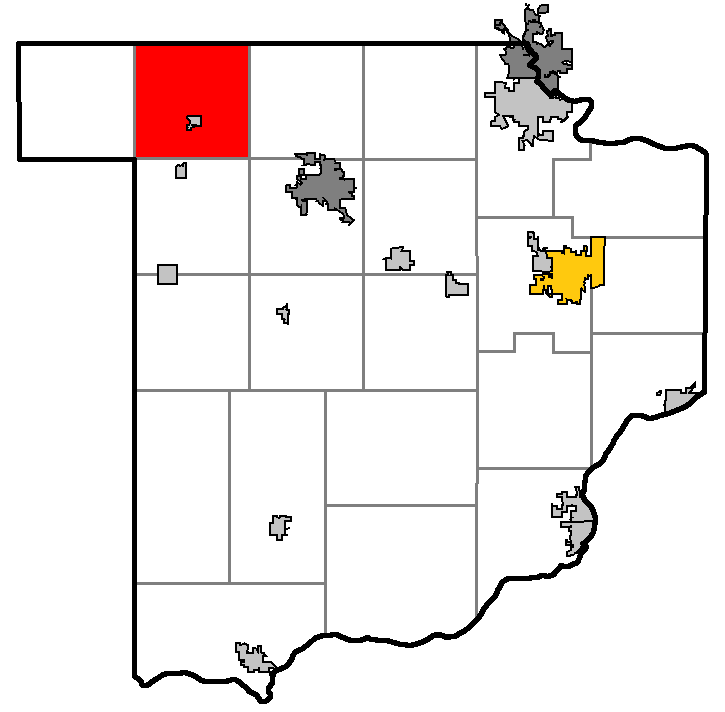
- Location of La Valle, Sauk County, Wisconsin

- Location of Sauk County, Wisconsin
- Coordinates: 43°35′50″N 90°08′02″W
- Country: United States
- State: Wisconsin
- County: Sauk

Area
  - Total: 35.32 sq mi (91.5 km^{2})
  - Land: 33.65 sq mi (87.2 km^{2})
  - Water: 1.67 sq mi (4.3 km^{2})

Population (2020)
  - Total: 1,420
  - Density: 42.2/sq mi (16.3/km^{2})
- Time zone: UTC-6 (Central (CST))
  - Summer (DST): UTC-5 (CDT)
- Area code(s): 608 and 353
- GNIS feature ID: 1583533
- Website: https://townoflavalle.us/

The Town of La Valle is located in Sauk County, Wisconsin, United States. La Valle is a name derived from French meaning "the valley". The population was 1,420 at the 2020 census. The Village of La Valle is located within the town.

== Geography ==
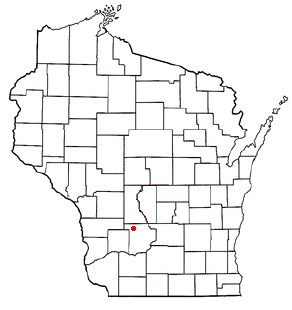
Location of La Valle (town), Wisconsin

According to the United States Census Bureau, the town has a total area of 35.3 square miles (91.5 km^{2}), of which 34.2 square miles (88.6 km^{2}) is land and 1.1 square miles (2.9 km^{2}) (3.20%) is water. La Valle is three miles from Lake Redstone.

=== Lakes ===
- Dutch Hollow Lake
- Lake Redstone

=== Cliffs ===
- Horse Bluff

== Demographics ==
As of the census of 2000, there were 1,203 people, 450 households, and 364 families residing in the town. The population density was 35.2 people per square mile (13.6/km^{2}). There were 914 housing units at an average density of 26.7 per square mile (10.3/km^{2}). The racial makeup of the town was 98.75% White, 0.08% Native American, 0.08% Asian, 0.58% from other races, and 0.50% from two or more races. 0.91% of the population were Hispanic or Latino of any race.

There were 450 households, out of which 29.6% had children under the age of 18 living with them, 74.0% were married couples living together, 4.0% had a female householder with no husband present, and 18.9% were non-families. 15.3% of all households were made up of individuals, and 7.8% had someone living alone who was 65 years of age or older. The average household size was 2.67 and the average family size was 2.96.

In the town, the population was spread out, with 25.4% under the age of 18, 7.0% from 18 to 24, 22.9% from 25 to 44, 26.4% from 45 to 64, and 18.3% who were 65 years of age or older. The median age was 42 years. For every 100 females, there were 106.3 males. For every 100 females age 18 and over, there were 108.4 males.

The median income for a household in the town was $45,350, and the median income for a family was $47,500. Males had a median income of $36,442 versus $23,417 for females. The per capita income for the town was $21,561. About 1.5% of families and 3.0% of the population were below the poverty line, including 1.4% of those under age 18 and 2.4% of those age 65 or over.
