= East Galena Township, Illinois =

East Galena Township
- Township
- Location in Jo Daviess County

- Jo Daviess County's location in Illinois
- Coordinates: 42°24′41″N 90°23′30″W
- Country: United States
- State: Illinois
- County: Jo Daviess
- Established: November 2, 1852

Government
  - Supervisor: Carlene H. Stephenson

Area
  - Total: 23.52 sq mi (60.9 km^{2})
  - Land: 23.33 sq mi (60.4 km^{2})
  - Water: 0.18 sq mi (0.47 km^{2}) 0.77%
- Elevation: 738 ft (225 m)

Population (2020)
  - Total: 1,287
  - Density: 55.17/sq mi (21.30/km^{2})
- Time zone: UTC-6 (CST)
  - Summer (DST): UTC-5 (CDT)
- ZIP codes: 61036, 61075
- FIPS code: 17-085-21813

East Galena Township is one of twenty-three townships in Jo Daviess County, Illinois, United States. As of the 2020 census, its population was 1,287 and it contained 913 housing units.

== Geography ==
According to the 2021 census gazetteer files, East Galena Township has a total area of 23.52 square miles (60.92 km^{2}), of which 23.33 square miles (60.42 km^{2}) (or 99.23%) is land and 0.18 square miles (0.47 km^{2}) (or 0.77%) is water.

=== Cities, towns, villages ===
- Galena

=== Cemeteries ===
The township contains two cemeteries, Miners Chapel and Saint Michaels.

=== Major highways ===
- U.S. Route 20
- Illinois Route 84

=== Airports and landing strips ===
- Heller Airport

=== Landmarks ===
- The Galena Territory

== Demographics ==
As of the 2020 census there were 1,287 people, 565 households, and 502 families residing in the township. The population density was 54.73 inhabitants per square mile (21.13/km^{2}). There were 913 housing units at an average density of 38.83 per square mile (14.99/km^{2}). The racial makeup of the township was 90.60% White, 0.39% African American, 0.70% Native American, 0.78% Asian, 0.00% Pacific Islander, 2.33% from other races, and 5.21% from two or more races. Hispanic or Latino people of any race were 4.04% of the population.

There were 565 households, out of which 22.80% had children under the age of 18 living with them, 81.95% were married couples living together, 3.01% had a female householder with no spouse present, and 11.15% were non-families. 11.20% of all households were made up of individuals, and 3.50% had someone living alone who was 65 years of age or older. The average household size was 2.14 and the average family size was 2.29.

The township's age distribution consisted of 13.6% under the age of 18, 1.7% from 18 to 24, 19% from 25 to 44, 41.8% from 45 to 64, and 23.8% who were 65 years of age or older. The median age was 47.6 years. For every 100 females, there were 104.0 males. For every 100 females age 18 and over, there were 93.0 males.

The median income for a household in the township was $78,958, and the median income for a family was $79,917. Males had a median income of $46,985 versus $43,306 for females. The per capita income for the township was $55,057. About 4.6% of families and 3.4% of the population were below the poverty line, including 6.6% of those under age 18 and 4.5% of those age 65 or over.

Historical population
Census	Pop.	Note	%±
2000	1,238		—
2010	1,283		3.6%
2020	1,287		0.3%
U.S. Decennial Census

== School districts ==
- Galena Unit School District 120
- Scales Mound Community Unit School District 211

== Political districts ==
- Illinois' 16th congressional district
- State House District 89
- State Senate District 45
