= Wapello Land & Water Reserve =

Nature reserve in Illinois, USA

- Location within Illinois
- Location: Hanover, Jo Daviess County, Illinois, United States
- Coordinates: 42.242712°N 90.26846°W
- Website: Jo Daviess Conservation Foundation

Wapello Land & Water Reserve is a nature reserve in the town now known as Hanover, Illinois, formerly Wapello, Illinois, as an honor to Chief Wapello of the Meskwaki tribe. The reserve is bordered on the east by Illinois Route 84 and on the west by the Apple River, as it approaches the Mississippi River.

The 170-acre reserve is managed by the Jo Daviess Conservation Foundation.
