= G. Walter Dittmar =

George Walter Dittmar (baptised Georg Walder Dittmar; April 1, 1872 – May 18, 1949) was an American dentist who was president of the American Dental Association.

== Biography ==
Dittmar was born in a log cabin in Derinda, Illinois, one of four children of German immigrants Albert Dittmar and Anna Maria Präger. His father, a writer and farmer, was born in Maßbach, Bavaria, and immigrated to Derinda with his family at age 8. George's mother, Anna (from Plaue, Prussia), died in 1877, and his father remarried to Mary Wurster, with whom he had five additional children. George was educated at Logan School, Philomath College, and Northwestern University Dental School.

He practiced dentistry in Apple River, Illinois, then went to Chicago to work with a well–known dentist, Dr. Galilee. He began his own successful practice and was in the Who's Who of Chicago in 1920.

He married Agnes Dooling in Galena, Illinois, in 1904. He had three children, Charlotte, Katherine, and George Walter, Jr.

He began his career on the faculty of the Illinois School of Dentistry in 1898. A professor and head of prosthetic dentistry, materia medica, and therapeutics, he published 43 dental research articles in the late 19th and early 20th centuries.

A popular teacher because of his genial personality, Dittmar is considered the "father" of the Department of Prosthetic Dentistry (now the Department of Restorative Dentistry) at the UIC College of Dentistry.

Dittmar achieved a national reputation as a writer, teacher, speaker, and executive. He made the University of Illinois College of Dentistry a national force when he became the first president of the Illinois State Dental Society, and later became the president of the American Dental Association, organized American dentistry's highest post.
