= Apple Canyon Lake, Illinois =

- Census-designated place
- Branigar's original Apple Canyon Lake logo (1968)

- Logo

- Location within Illinois Location within the United States
- Coordinates: 42°25′14″N 90°09′23″W
- Country: United States
- State: Illinois
- County: Jo Daviess

Area
  - Total: 4.37 sq mi (11.32 km^{2})
  - Land: 3.71 sq mi (9.62 km^{2})
  - Water: 0.66 sq mi (1.70 km^{2})
- Elevation: 853 ft (260 m)

Population (2020)
  - Total: 574
  - Density: 154.5/sq mi (59.64/km^{2})
- Time zone: UTC−6 (Central (CST))
  - Summer (DST): UTC−5 (CDT)
- Area codes: 815 & 779
- GNIS feature ID: 2629890
- Website: www.applecanyonlake.org

Apple Canyon Lake is a census-designated place in Thompson Township, Jo Daviess County, Illinois, United States. Its population was 574 as of the 2020 census.

== History ==
Apple Canyon Lake is a planned vacation community developed in the late 1960s by the Branigar Organization of Medinah, Illinois. Branigar had developed similar vacation home projects in Wisconsin: Dutch Hollow Lake and Lake Redstone where Branigar built a dam along a stream and then sold water front vacation lots. Branigar assembled the 2,700 acres (1,100 ha) of land in Jo Daviess County, Illinois that was considered by farmers as marginal pasture land due to the steep inclines and rocky out croppings of limestone. An interesting aspect of the development is that 85 percent of the 15 miles of shore line is unsubdivided and is to remain green space. This provides lake access to those lots not on the shoreline. In addition, the main road is set back from the lake with lots accessible via cul de sacs.

In the summer of 1969, Branigar began constructing the Apple Canyon Lake dam which would ultimately create a 400-acre lake with an average depth of 40 feet. In addition, a club house, pool, golf course, marina and private airport were built in order to attract potential lot buyers. By the fall of 1969, Branigar was heavily marketing the Apple Canyon Lake vacation lots in the Chicago market. The 2,200 individual lots ranged in size from one-half to two acres (0.20 to 0.81 ha) with water and underground electricity/phone servicing each lot. Lot prices ranged from $12,000 to $34,000 in 1969.

== Geography ==
According to the 2021 census gazetteer files, Apple Canyon Lake has a total area of 4.37 square miles (11.32 km^{2}), of which 3.72 square miles (9.63 km^{2}) (or 85.00%) is land and 0.66 square miles (1.71 km^{2}) (or 15.00%) is water.

== Demographics ==
As of the 2020 census there were 574 people, 307 households, and 239 families residing in the CDP. The population density was 131.29 inhabitants per square mile (50.69/km^{2}). There were 900 housing units at an average density of 205.86 per square mile (79.48/km^{2}). The racial makeup of the CDP was 96.52% White, 0.52% African American, 0.17% Native American, 0.00% Asian, 0.00% Pacific Islander, 0.00% from other races, and 2.79% from two or more races. Hispanic or Latino people of any race were 1.92% of the population.

There were 307 households, out of which 31.3% had children under the age of 18 living with them, 53.75% were married couples living together, 22.80% had a female householder with no husband present, and 22.15% were non-families. 21.82% of all households were made up of individuals, and 13.03% had someone living alone who was 65 years of age or older. The average household size was 2.37 and the average family size was 2.08.

The CDP's age distribution consisted of 16.4% under the age of 18, 8.8% from 18 to 24, 13.2% from 25 to 44, 27.2% from 45 to 64, and 34.4% who were 65 years of age or older. The median age was 55.2 years. For every 100 females, there were 76.0 males. For every 100 females age 18 and over, there were 86.7 males.

The median income for a household in the CDP was $79,844, and the median income for a family was $86,250. Males had a median income of $73,056 versus $30,096 for females. The per capita income for the CDP was $40,355. About 13.0% of families and 18.6% of the population were below the poverty line, including 34.3% of those under age 18 and 0.0% of those age 65 or over.

Historical population
Census	Pop.	Note	%±
2010	558		—
2020	574		2.9%
U.S. Decennial Census

== Education ==
The CDP is divided between three school districts: Scales Mound Community Unit School District 211, Stockton Community Unit School District 206, and Warren Community Unit School District 205.

The Scales Mound Community Unit School District 211 operates these public schools: Scales Mound Elementary School, Scales Mound Junior High School, and Scales Mound High School.
