= Council Hill Township, Illinois =

Council Hill Township
- Township
- Location in Jo Daviess County

- Jo Daviess County's location in Illinois
- Coordinates: 42°28′38″N 90°21′03″W
- Country: United States
- State: Illinois
- County: Jo Daviess
- Established: November 2, 1852

Government
  - Supervisor: Patrick Keleher

Area
  - Total: 16.43 sq mi (42.6 km^{2})
  - Land: 16.43 sq mi (42.6 km^{2})
  - Water: 0 sq mi (0 km^{2}) 0%
- Elevation: 869 ft (265 m)

Population (2020)
  - Total: 161
  - Density: 9.80/sq mi (3.78/km^{2})
- Time zone: UTC-6 (CST)
  - Summer (DST): UTC-5 (CDT)
- ZIP codes: 61036, 61075
- FIPS code: 17-085-16639

Council Hill Township is one of 23 townships in Jo Daviess County, Illinois, United States. As of the 2020 census, its population was 161 and it contained 81 housing units. Its name changed from Scales Township on December 6, 1853.

== Geography ==
According to the 2021 census gazetteer files, Council Hill Township has a total area of 16.43 square miles (42.55 km^{2}), all land.

=== Cemeteries ===
The township contains two cemeteries, Council Hill and Grant Hill.

== Demographics ==
As of the 2020 census there were 161 people, 67 households, and 49 families residing in the township. The population density was 9.80 inhabitants per square mile (3.78/km^{2}). There were 81 housing units at an average density of 4.93 per square mile (1.90/km^{2}). The racial makeup of the township was 95.65% White, 0.00% African American, 0.00% Native American, 0.00% Asian, 0.00% Pacific Islander, 0.62% from other races, and 3.73% from two or more races. Hispanic or Latino of any race were 0.62% of the population.

There were 67 households, out of which 22.40% had children under the age of 18 living with them, 73.13% were married couples living together, 0.00% had a female householder with no spouse present, and 26.87% were non-families. 26.90% of all households were made up of individuals, and 6.00% had someone living alone who was 65 years of age or older. The average household size was 2.09 and the average family size was 2.49.

The township's age distribution consisted of 17.1% under the age of 18, 5.0% from 18 to 24, 20.8% from 25 to 44, 27.8% from 45 to 64, and 29.3% who were 65 years of age or older. The median age was 53.4 years. For every 100 females, there were 125.8 males. For every 100 females age 18 and over, there were 87.1 males.

The median income for a family was $109,063. Males had a median income of $49,688 versus $30,500 for females. The per capita income for the township was $35,621. No families and 5.0% of the population were below the poverty line, including none of those under age 18 and none of those age 65 or over.

Historical population
Census	Pop.	Note	%±
2000	180		—
2010	141		−21.7%
2020	161		14.2%
U.S. Decennial Census

== School districts ==
- Galena Unit School District 120
- Scales Mound Community Unit School District 211

== Political districts ==
- Illinois' 16th congressional district
- State House District 89
- State Senate District 45
