= La Valle, Wisconsin =

- Village
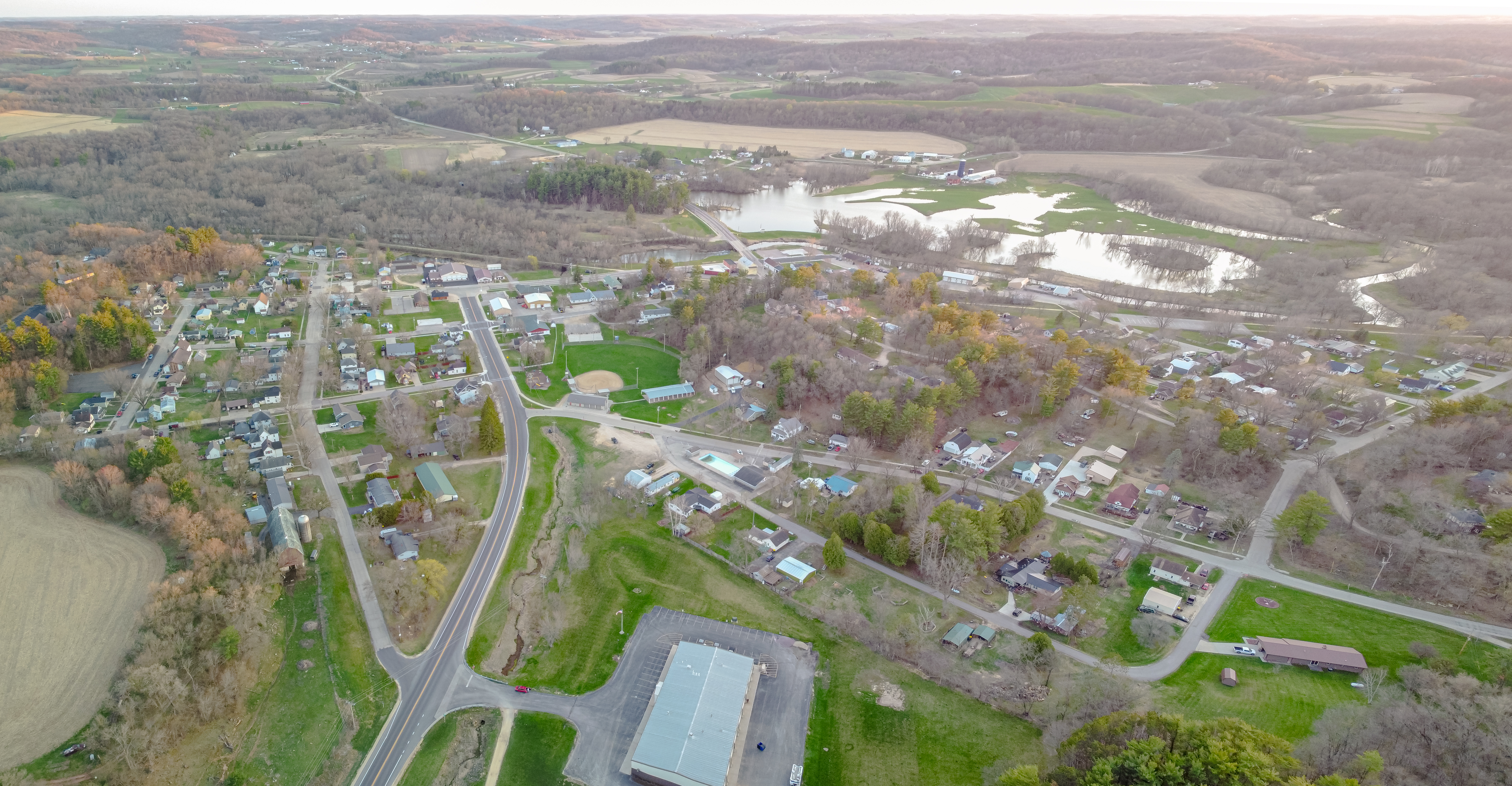
- Wis-58 and Wis-33 run concurrently through town

- Location of La Valle in Sauk County, Wisconsin.
- Coordinates: 43°34′59″N 90°7′47″W
- Country: United States
- State: Wisconsin
- County: Sauk

Area
  - Total: 0.41 sq mi (1.05 km^{2})
  - Land: 0.40 sq mi (1.03 km^{2})
  - Water: 0.0077 sq mi (0.02 km^{2})
- Elevation: 1,024 ft (312 m)

Population (2020)
  - Total: 388
  - Density: 976/sq mi (377/km^{2})
- Time zone: UTC-6 (Central (CST))
  - Summer (DST): UTC-5 (CDT)
- Area code: 608
- FIPS code: 55-42850
- GNIS feature ID: 1567700
- Website: https://villageoflavallewi.gov/

La Valle is a village in Sauk County, Wisconsin, United States, along the Baraboo River. The population was 388 at the 2020 census. The village is located within the Town of La Valle.

== History ==
A post office called La Valle has been in operation since 1856. La Valle is derived from the French meaning "the valley".

== Geography ==
La Valle is located at 43°34′59″N 90°7′53″W (43.583102, -90.131648).

According to the United States Census Bureau, the village has a total area of 0.43 square miles (1.11 km^{2}), of which 0.42 square miles (1.09 km^{2}) is land and 0.01 square miles (0.03 km^{2}) is water.

== Demographics ==
Historical population
Census	Pop.	Note	%±
1880	306		—
1890	333		8.8%
1900	386		15.9%
1910	421		9.1%
1920	447		6.2%
1930	415		−7.2%
1940	408		−1.7%
1950	448		9.8%
1960	417		−6.9%
1970	411		−1.4%
1980	412		0.2%
1990	446		8.3%
2000	326		−26.9%
2010	367		12.6%
2020	388		5.7%
U.S. Decennial Census

The economy of the village of La Valle is largely driven by tourism and the lake communities at nearby Lake Redstone and Dutch Hollow Lake.

=== 2010 census ===
As of the census of 2010, there were 367 people, 165 households, and 97 families living in the village. The population density was 873.8 inhabitants per square mile (337.4/km^{2}). There were 172 housing units at an average density of 409.5 per square mile (158.1/km^{2}). The racial makeup of the village was 97.5% White, 0.3% African American, 1.6% Asian, and 0.5% from two or more races. Hispanic or Latino of any race were 2.2% of the population.

There were 165 households, of which 29.1% had children under the age of 18 living with them, 39.4% were married couples living together, 12.1% had a female householder with no husband present, 7.3% had a male householder with no wife present, and 41.2% were non-families. 31.5% of all households were made up of individuals, and 14.5% had someone living alone who was 65 years of age or older. The average household size was 2.22 and the average family size was 2.78.

The median age in the village was 39.1 years. 20.4% of residents were under the age of 18; 9.1% were between the ages of 18 and 24; 27.8% were from 25 to 44; 24% were from 45 to 64; and 18.8% were 65 years of age or older. The gender makeup of the village was 51.0% male and 49.0% female.

=== 2000 census ===
As of the census of 2000, there were 326 people, 132 households, and 88 families living in the village. The population density was 778.8 people per square mile (299.7/km^{2}). There were 139 housing units at an average density of 332.0 per square mile (127.8/km^{2}). The racial makeup of the village was 97.55% White, 2.15% from other races, and 0.31% from two or more races. 2.15% of the population were Hispanic or Latino of any race.

There were 132 households, out of which 28.0% had children under the age of 18 living with them, 53.8% were married couples living together, 9.1% had a female householder with no husband present, and 32.6% were non-families. 24.2% of all households were made up of individuals, and 18.9% had someone living alone who was 65 years of age or older. The average household size was 2.47 and the average family size was 2.92.

In the village, the population was spread out, with 23.9% under the age of 18, 7.1% from 18 to 24, 31.9% from 25 to 44, 17.5% from 45 to 64, and 19.6% who were 65 years of age or older. The median age was 38 years. For every 100 females, there were 87.4 males. For every 100 females age 18 and over, there were 89.3 males.

The median income for a household in the village was $36,250, and the median income for a family was $42,000. Males had a median income of $31,953 versus $19,167 for females. The per capita income for the village was $16,823. None of the families and 3.1% of the population were living below the poverty line, including no under eighteens and 14.3% of those over 64.

== Education ==
La Valle is served by the School District of Reedsburg, which has 4 elementary schools, 1 intermediate school, 1 middle school, and 1 high school. Ironton-La Valle Elementary School is the only school in La Valle.

== Notable people ==
- Benjamin G. Paddock, Wisconsin state legislator and politician
- Glenn Wise, Wisconsin Secretary of State from 1955 to 1957.
