= Guilford Township, Illinois =

Guilford Township
- Township
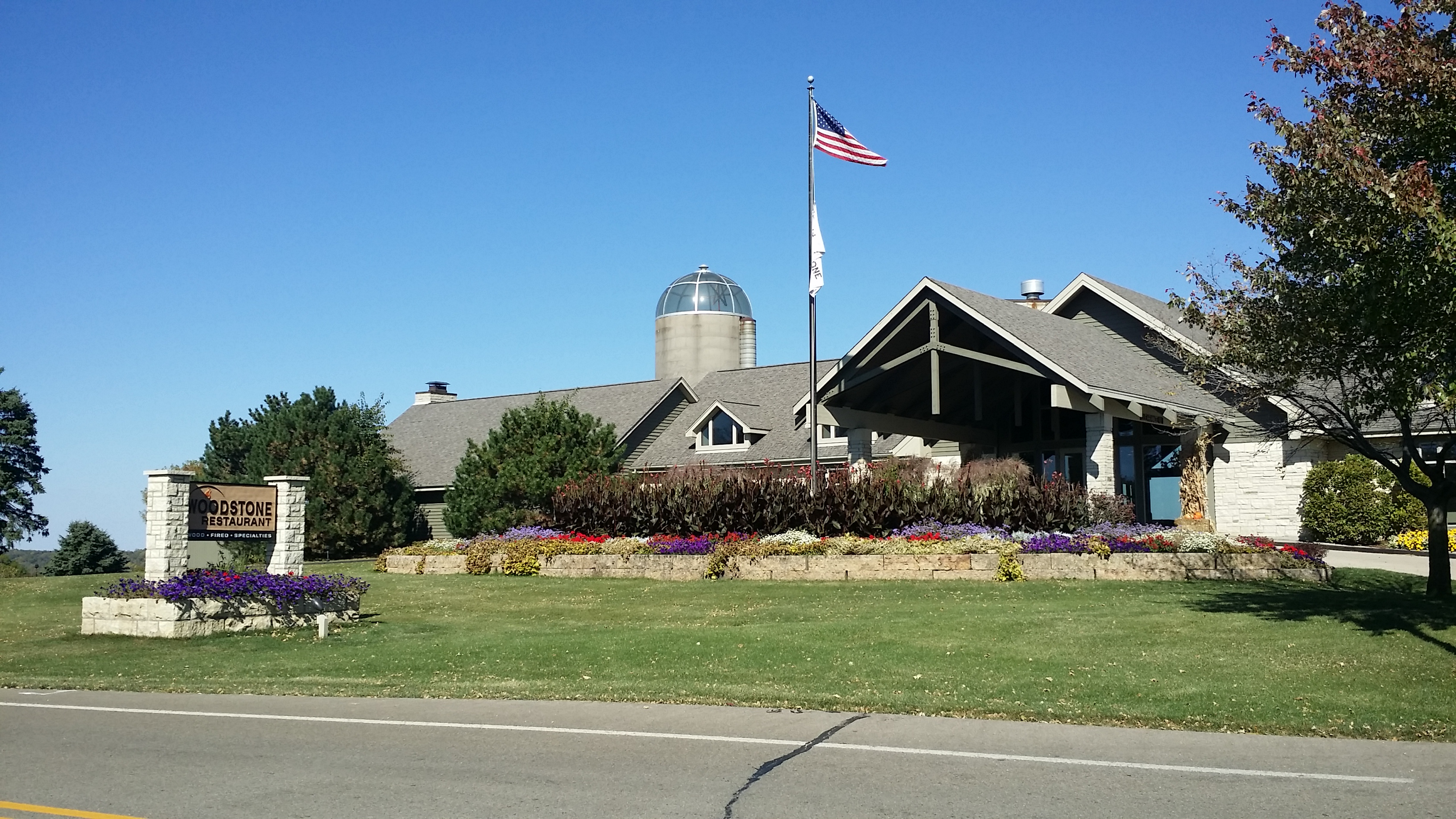
- Highlands Restaurant

- Location in Jo Daviess County

- Jo Daviess County's location in Illinois
- Coordinates: 42°24′50″N 90°17′24″W
- Country: United States
- State: Illinois
- County: Jo Daviess
- Established: November 2, 1852

Area
  - Total: 37.28 sq mi (96.6 km^{2})
  - Land: 37.11 sq mi (96.1 km^{2})
  - Water: 0.17 sq mi (0.44 km^{2}) 0.45%
- Elevation: 794 ft (242 m)

Population (2020)
  - Total: 1,504
  - Density: 40.53/sq mi (15.65/km^{2})
- Time zone: UTC-6 (CST)
  - Summer (DST): UTC-5 (CDT)
- ZIP codes: 61028, 61036, 61075
- Area code: 815 779
- FIPS code: 17-085-31979
- Website: www.guilfordtownship.org

Guilford Township is one of 23 townships in Jo Daviess County, Illinois, United States. At the 2020 census, its population was 1,504 and it contained 1,835 housing units.

== Geography ==
According to the 2021 census gazetteer files, Guilford Township has a total area of 37.28 square miles (96.55 km^{2}), of which 37.11 square miles (96.11 km^{2}) (or 99.55%) is land and 0.17 square miles (0.44 km^{2}) (or 0.45%) is water.

=== Cemeteries ===
The township contains Singers Catholic Cemetery and a small cemetery that has the Jelly family, Taylor family and others. Located on Cemetery Ridge Road, it dates to circa 1840.

=== Major highways ===
- U.S. Route 20
- Illinois Route 84

=== Landmarks ===
- The Galena Territory, a census-designated place

== Demographics ==
As of the 2020 census there were 1,504 people, 600 households, and 470 families residing in the township. The population density was 40.35 inhabitants per square mile (15.58/km^{2}). There were 1,835 housing units at an average density of 49.22 per square mile (19.00/km^{2}). The racial makeup of the township was 95.35% White, 0.40% African American, 0.47% Native American, 0.27% Asian, 0.00% Pacific Islander, 0.27% from other races, and 3.26% from two or more races. Hispanic or Latino people of any race were 2.53% of the population.

There were 600 households, out of which 10.00% had children under the age of 18 living with them, 74.83% were married couples living together, 3.17% had a female householder with no spouse present, and 21.67% were non-families. 17.80% of all households were made up of individuals, and 8.80% had someone living alone who was 65 years of age or older. The average household size was 2.12 and the average family size was 2.38.

The township's age distribution consisted of 10.9% under the age of 18, 2.4% from 18 to 24, 10.1% from 25 to 44, 24.5% from 45 to 64, and 52.2% who were 65 years of age or older. The median age was 65.9 years. For every 100 females, there were 96.1 males. For every 100 females age 18 and over, there were 93.2 males.

The median income for a household in the township was $85,294, and the median income for a family was $95,882. Males had a median income of $50,357 versus $30,375 for females. The per capita income for the township was $46,145. About 1.7% of families and 4.2% of the population were below the poverty line, including 2.9% of those under age 18 and 4.1% of those age 65 or over.

Historical population
Census	Pop.	Note	%±
2000	1,021		—
2010	1,206		18.1%
2020	1,504		24.7%
U.S. Decennial Census

== School districts ==
- River Ridge Community Unit School District 210
- Scales Mound Community Unit School District 211

== Political districts ==
- Illinois's 16th congressional district
- State House District 89
- State Senate District 45
