= Council Hill =

Council Hill may refer to the following places in the United States:

- Council Hill, Illinois
- Council Hill, Oklahoma, the most populous Council Hill in the US
