= Massbach, Illinois =

- Unincorporated community
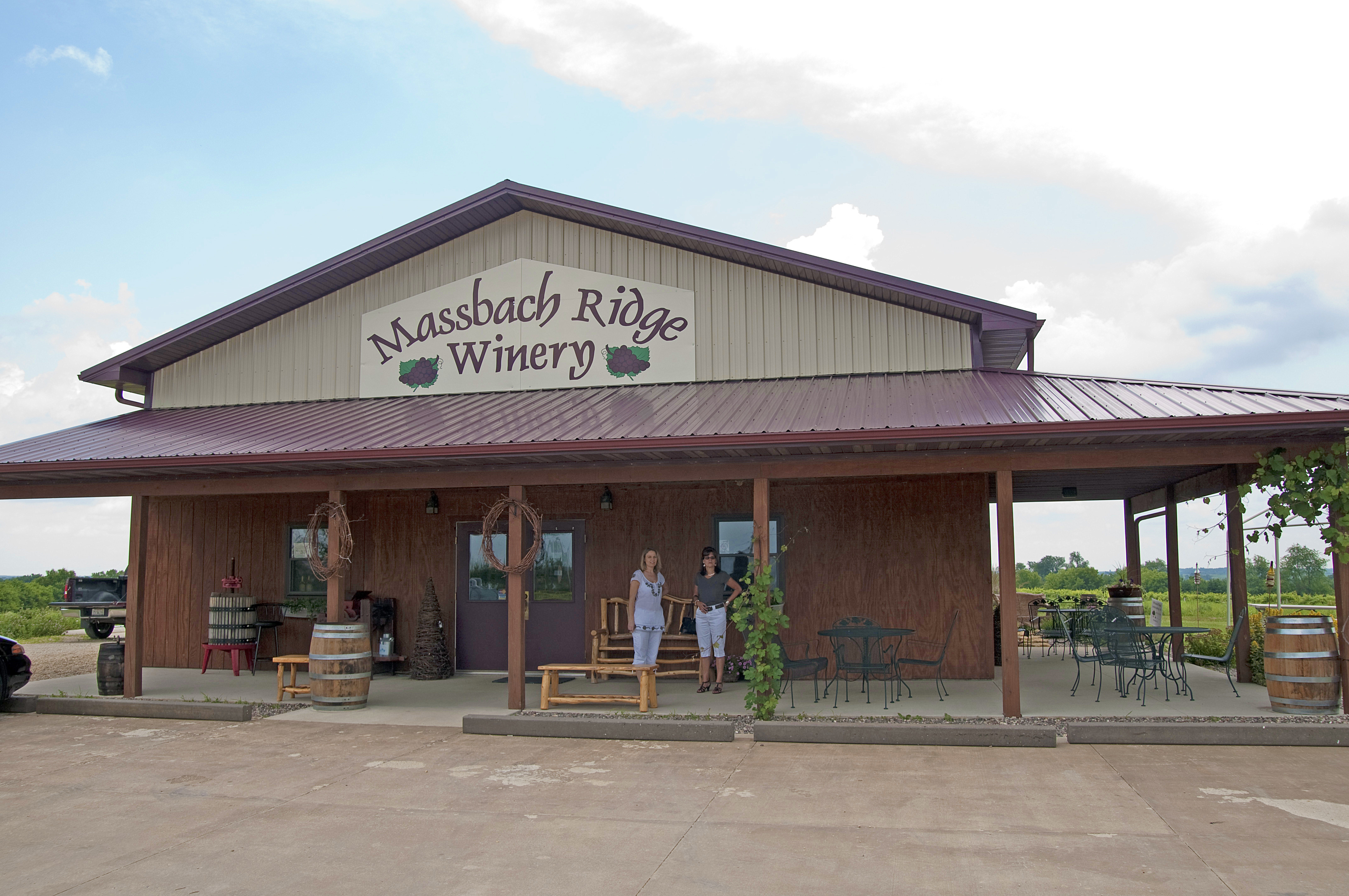

- Location within Illinois Location within the United States
- Coordinates: 42°14′46″N 90°07′18″W
- Country: United States
- State: Illinois
- County: Jo Daviess
- Elevation: 928 ft (283 m)
- Time zone: UTC-6 (Central (CST))
  - Summer (DST): UTC-5 (CDT)
- Area code: 618
- GNIS feature ID: 413108

Massbach is an unincorporated community in Derinda Township, Jo Daviess County, Illinois, United States. Massbach is 7 miles (11 km) southeast of Elizabeth.
