= Guilford Township =

Guilford Township may refer to:

== Places ==
=== United States ===
- Guilford Township, Jo Daviess County, Illinois
- Guilford Township, Hendricks County, Indiana
- Guilford Township, Monroe County, Iowa
- Guilford Township, Medina County, Ohio
- Guilford Township, Pennsylvania
