= Chestnut Mountain =

Ski area in Illinois, United States

Chestnut Mountain Ski Resort
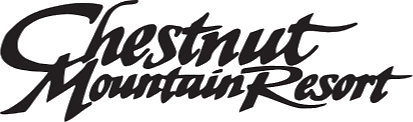
- Interactive map of Chestnut Mountain Ski Resort
- Location: Galena IL
- Vertical: 420 ft (130 m)
- Top elevation: 1,020 ft (310 m)
- Base elevation: 600 ft (180 m)
- Skiable area: 220 acres (0.89 km^{2})
- Trails: 19
- Longest run: 0.66 miles (1.06 km)
- Lift system: 9: 2 Quad, 4 Triple chairlifts 3 Surface
- Terrain parks: 1 "The Far Side"
- Snowfall: 34 inches
- Website: chestnutmtn.com

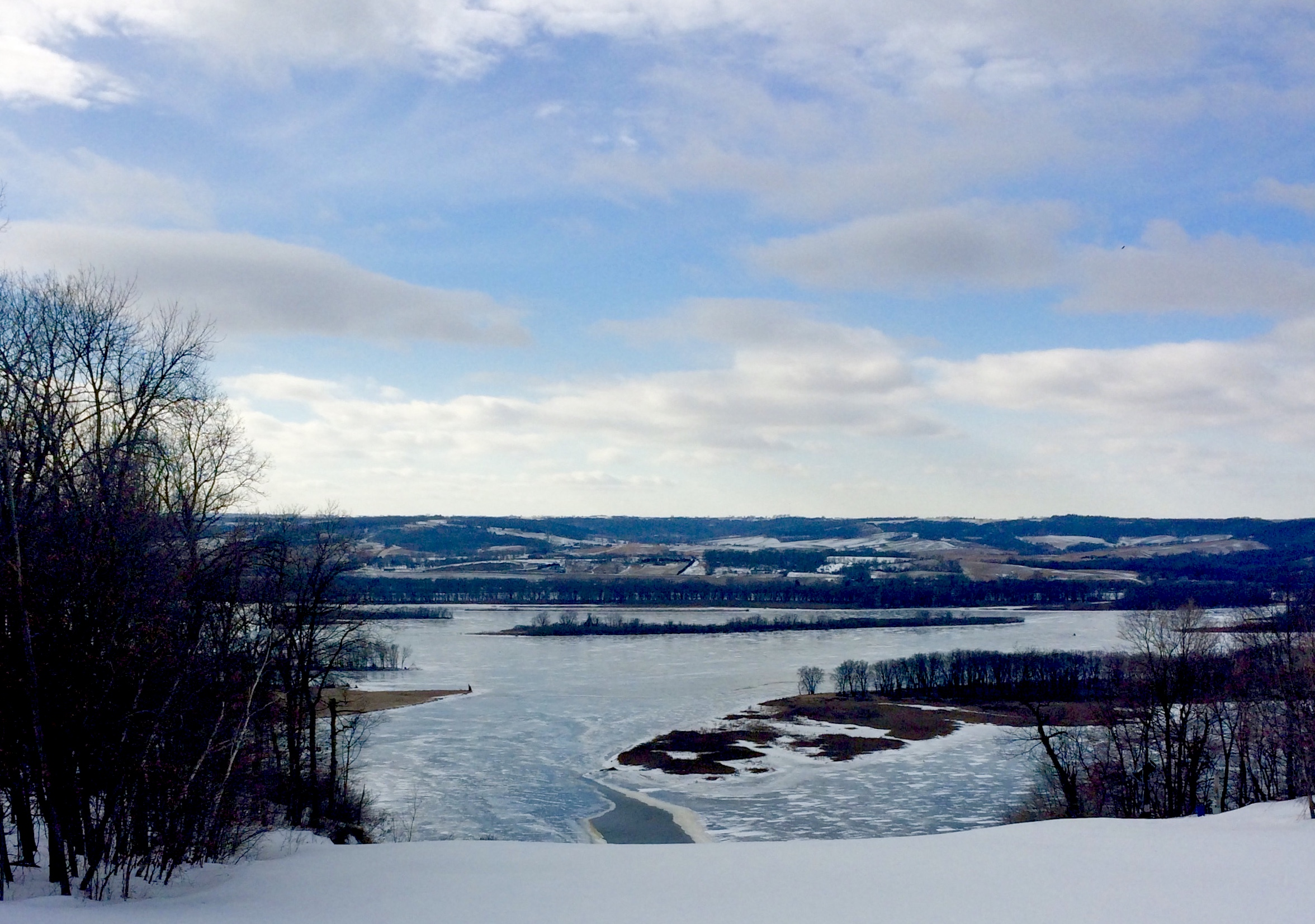
Chestnut Mountain Ski Resort

The Chestnut Mountain ski resort is located in Galena, Illinois, 20 miles southeast of Dubuque, Iowa, in Jo Daviess County. It is visible from a 10-mile radius. The ski resort opened in 1959 and features two restaurants, a lodge with 119 rooms, an indoor pool and hot tub area, as well as several other accommodations. There are 19 ski runs: 4 Beginner, 11 Intermediate, 3 Advanced, plus "The Far Side", a snowboarding terrain park. The park has two quad chairs, four triple chairs, and two surface lifts.

Chestnut Mountain's 20,000 square foot ski center houses an apparel shop, equipment rental area, and ticketing outlet. The apparel shop features Rossignol skis and boots, Burton Snowboards, and clothing from Burton and Nordica (company). The Ski Center Pro Shop also houses a ski school, first aid station, and tuning shop.

Chestnut Mountain has a Children's Center, and there is an affiliated Chestnut Mountain Race Team.

During the warmer seasons, the resort operates a mini golf course and a playground, as well as an Alpine Slide served by a ski lift. Boat rides on the Mississippi River are available from the resort from Memorial Day through late October.

The Special Olympics of Illinois annually conducts the Winter Special Olympics at Chestnut Mountain.

== Summer activities ==
Summer Activities include the Alpine Slide, River Cruise, Zip Line, Segway tours, Mini Golf, Disc Golf, and Biking. The cruise showcases geographical curiosities and riverscapes.

== Winter activities ==
Chestnut Mountain’s slopes are meant for various skill levels of skiers and boarders to enjoy. Transworld has chosen Chestnut Mountain as their top-rated Midwest snowboard park for three years running.

== Special Olympics ==
Chestnut Mountain annually hosts a Special Olympics event that consists of nine state sport winter game competition. These events include Alpine Skiing, Cross-Country Skiing and Snowshoeing and approximately 400 athletes compete in this three-day event. While participation is noted, the only competition events are Alpine Skiing, Cross-Country Skiing, and Snowshoeing. Athletes are not permitted to participate in more than one competition. There are also Volunteer opportunities available during the Special Olympics events.

The entire Special Olympics event consists of an opening ceremony, the winter games reception, and a victory dance to celebrate the day. The opening ceremony consists of a parade and a torch run: the parade progresses through downtown and ends where the Opening Ceremony is held, and with the help of law enforcement officers, athletes hand off the torch in the torch run and light the cauldron to kick off the games.

== Controversy ==
In 2002, Fisher V. Chestnut Mountain Resort, Inc (N.D.ILL.2002), Plaintiffs accused defendants of the unlawful discharge of pollutants. In 1997, Chestnut Mountain built a terrain park called "The Far Side" on the backside of the mountain leading down into the Watercress Creek, which is a tributary of the Mississippi River that runs through the Plaintiff's property. The Plaintiffs have found copper, zinc lead, chromium, and phosphorus in the Mississippi River, due to the production of artificial snow on The Far Side, which then melts and finds its way into Watercress Creek and eventually the Mississippi. Due to the construction of The Far Side, there are now gullies and rivulets on The Far Side carrying water down into the plaintiffs property. Due to the new construction and erosion of The Far Side, rocks and debris have found their way into the underlying valley. On top of that, Watercress Creek has been observed to be turbid, covered in green slime, foam, and suds. The case was dismissed due to the lack of evidence found on the pollutants against the defendants.

In 2012, the EPA issued a permit to the Chestnut Mountain ski lodge allowing them to discharge into the waters of the State.
