= Woodbine Township, Jo Daviess County, Illinois =

Woodbine Township
- Township
- Location in Jo Daviess County

- Jo Daviess County's location in Illinois
- Coordinates: 42°19′33″N 90°10′03″W
- Country: United States
- State: Illinois
- County: Jo Daviess
- Established: November 2, 1852

Government
  - Supervisor: Diane Marcure

Area
  - Total: 36.74 sq mi (95.2 km^{2})
  - Land: 36.74 sq mi (95.2 km^{2})
  - Water: 0 sq mi (0 km^{2}) 0%
- Elevation: 827 ft (252 m)

Population (2020)
  - Total: 543
  - Density: 14.8/sq mi (5.71/km^{2})
- Time zone: UTC-6 (CST)
  - Summer (DST): UTC-5 (CDT)
- ZIP codes: 61028, 61085
- FIPS code: 17-085-82907

Woodbine Township is one of 23 townships in Jo Daviess County, Illinois, United States. As of the 2020 census, its population was 543 and it contained 386 housing units. Its name changed from Jefferson Township on September 13, 1853.

== Geography ==
According to the 2021 census gazetteer files, Woodbine Township has a total area of 36.74 square miles (95.16 km^{2}), all land.

=== Cities, towns, villages ===
- Community of Woodbine

=== Cemeteries ===
The township contains Woodbine Cemetery.

=== Major highways ===
- U.S. Route 20 east towards Stockton and west toward Elizabeth

== Demographics ==
As of the 2020 census there were 543 people, 251 households, and 134 families residing in the township. The population density was 14.78 inhabitants per square mile (5.71/km^{2}). There were 386 housing units at an average density of 10.51 per square mile (4.06/km^{2}). The racial makeup of the township was 95.95% White, 0.18% African American, 0.00% Native American, 0.37% Asian, 0.00% Pacific Islander, 1.10% from other races, and 2.39% from two or more races. Hispanic or Latino people of any race were 2.39% of the population.

There were 251 households, out of which 23.10% had children under the age of 18 living with them, 49.00% were married couples living together, 4.38% had a female householder with no spouse present, and 46.61% were non-families. 43.80% of all households were made up of individuals, and 24.30% had someone living alone who was 65 years of age or older. The average household size was 1.92 and the average family size was 2.57.

The township's age distribution consisted of 17.3% under the age of 18, 1.2% from 18 to 24, 23.7% from 25 to 44, 23.1% from 45 to 64, and 34.7% who were 65 years of age or older. The median age was 52.6 years. For every 100 females, there were 75.5 males. For every 100 females age 18 and over, there were 79.3 males.

The median income for a household in the township was $46,625, and the median income for a family was $64,750. Males had a median income of $32,150 versus $16,522 for females. The per capita income for the township was $28,675. About 8.2% of families and 11.9% of the population were below the poverty line, including 19.3% of those under age 18 and 6.0% of those age 65 or over.

Historical population
Census	Pop.	Note	%±
2000	605		—
2010	584		−3.5%
2020	543		−7.0%
U.S. Decennial Census

== School districts ==
- River Ridge Community Unit School District 210
- Stockton Community Unit School District 206

== Political districts ==
- Illinois' 16th congressional district
- State House District 89
- State Senate District 45
