= Whitton, Illinois =

- Unincorporated community
- Location within Illinois Location within the United States
- Coordinates: 42°13′33″N 90°18′30″W
- Country: United States
- State: Illinois
- County: Jo Daviess
- Elevation: 607 ft (185 m)
- Time zone: UTC-6 (Central (CST))
  - Summer (DST): UTC-5 (CDT)
- Zip: 61041
- Area codes: 815 & 779
- GNIS feature ID: 423307

Whitton was an unincorporated community in Jo Daviess County, Illinois, United States. In 1931, it had a population of about 40. It is located near the Hanover Bluff Nature Preserve.
