= Jo Daviess Conservation Foundation =

- Formation: 1993; 33 years ago
- Founder: Maintain open space in Jo Daviess County, Illinois
- Legal status: Active
- Headquarters: Elizabeth, Illinois, U.S.
- Region served: Jo Daviess County, Illinois
- President: Fran Peterson
- Main organ: Board of Directors
- Website: jdcf.org

The Jo Daviess Conservation Foundation was created as a charitable organization in 1993 to protect open spaces in Jo Daviess County, Illinois. The foundation currently protects 6 areas and participates in protection of a seventh. The area protected by the foundation includes the Driftless Area of northwest Illinois and stretches of the Mississippi River, along with its tributaries and geological structures.

== History ==
When a critical piece of property in the Galena, Illinois area went on sale in 1993, some residents bonded together to acquire that piece of property by forming the foundation. The foundation has since broadened its scope to protect more areas in Jo Daviess County.

== Protected areas ==
Several areas are protected by the foundation:

- Buehler Preserve
- Casper Bluff Land & Water Reserve
- Horseshoe Mound
- Schurmeier Teaching Forest
- Valley of Eden Bird Sanctuary
- Wapello Land & Water Reserve
- Galena Gateway Park – co-managed
