= Berreman Township, Illinois =

Berreman Township
- Township
- Location in Jo Daviess County

- Jo Daviess County's location in Illinois
- Coordinates: 42°14′25″N 89°56′23″W
- Country: United States
- State: Illinois
- County: Jo Daviess
- Established: February 14, 1857

Government
  - Supervisor: Daniel Caswell

Area
  - Total: 17.81 sq mi (46.1 km^{2})
  - Land: 17.81 sq mi (46.1 km^{2})
  - Water: 0 sq mi (0 km^{2}) 0%
- Elevation: 866 ft (264 m)

Population (2020)
  - Total: 137
  - Density: 7.69/sq mi (2.97/km^{2})
- Time zone: UTC-6 (CST)
  - Summer (DST): UTC-5 (CDT)
- ZIP codes: 61053, 61062, 61085
- FIPS code: 17-085-05495

Berreman Township is one of 23 townships in Jo Daviess County, Illinois, United States. As of the 2020 census, its population was 137 and it contained 73 housing units. It was formed from Pleasant Valley Township on February 14, 1857.

== Geography ==
According to the 2021 census gazetteer files, Berreman Township has a total area of 17.81 square miles (46.13 km^{2}), all land.

=== Cemeteries ===
The township contains Clay Cemetery.

== Demographics ==
As of the 2020 census there were 137 people, 57 households, and 40 families residing in the township. The population density was 7.69 inhabitants per square mile (2.97/km^{2}). There were 73 housing units at an average density of 4.10 per square mile (1.58/km^{2}). The racial makeup of the township was 94.16% White, 0.00% African American, 0.73% Native American, 1.46% Asian, 0.00% Pacific Islander, 0.00% from other races, and 3.65% from two or more races. Hispanic or Latino of any race were 2.92% of the population.

There were 57 households, out of which 12.30% had children under the age of 18 living with them, 70.18% were married couples living together, 0.00% had a female householder with no spouse present, and 29.82% were non-families. 29.80% of all households were made up of individuals, and 29.80% had someone living alone who was 65 years of age or older. The average household size was 2.09 and the average family size was 2.55.

The township's age distribution consisted of 16.8% under the age of 18, 0.0% from 18 to 24, 11.8% from 25 to 44, 30.2% from 45 to 64, and 41.2% who were 65 years of age or older. The median age was 58.9 years. For every 100 females, there were 120.4 males. For every 100 females age 18 and over, there were 115.2 males.

The median income for a household in the township was $103,906, and the median income for a family was $104,063. Males had a median income of $71,071 versus $39,219 for females. The per capita income for the township was $47,839. None of the population was below the poverty line.

Historical population
Census	Pop.	Note	%±
2000	174		—
2010	147		−15.5%
2020	137		−6.8%
U.S. Decennial Census

== School districts ==
- Pearl City Community Unit School District 200
- Stockton Community Unit School District 206
- West Carroll Community Unit School District 314

== Political districts ==
- Illinois' 16th congressional district
- State House District 89
- State Senate District 45
