= Wards Grove Township, Jo Daviess County, Illinois =

Wards Grove Township
- Township
- Location in Jo Daviess County

- Jo Daviess County's location in Illinois
- Coordinates: 42°20′06″N 89°57′40″W
- Country: United States
- State: Illinois
- County: Jo Daviess
- Established: November 2, 1852

Government
  - Supervisor: Richard Lyons

Area
  - Total: 17.89 sq mi (46.3 km^{2})
  - Land: 17.89 sq mi (46.3 km^{2})
  - Water: 0 sq mi (0 km^{2}) 0%
- Elevation: 961 ft (293 m)

Population (2020)
  - Total: 215
  - Density: 12.0/sq mi (4.64/km^{2})
- Time zone: UTC-6 (CST)
  - Summer (DST): UTC-5 (CDT)
- ZIP codes: 61044, 61048, 61085
- FIPS code: 17-085-78799

Wards Grove Township is one of 23 townships in Jo Daviess County, Illinois, United States. As of the 2020 census, its population was 215 and it contained 98 housing units.

== Geography ==
According to the 2021 census gazetteer files, Wards Grove Township has a total area of 17.89 square miles (46.33 km^{2}), all land.

=== Cemeteries ===
The township contains Blair Cemetery.

=== Major highways ===
- U.S. Route 20
- Illinois Route 78

=== Airports and landing strips ===
- Providence Place Field (99IL)

== Demographics ==
As of the 2020 census there were 215 people, 112 households, and 61 families residing in the township. The population density was 12.02 inhabitants per square mile (4.64/km^{2}). There were 98 housing units at an average density of 5.48 per square mile (2.12/km^{2}). The racial makeup of the township was 93.02% White, 0.93% African American, 0.00% Native American, 0.93% Asian, 0.00% Pacific Islander, 0.00% from other races, and 5.12% from two or more races. Hispanic or Latino of any race were 2.33% of the population.

There were 112 households, out of which 25.00% had children under the age of 18 living with them, 54.46% were married couples living together, 0.00% had a female householder with no spouse present, and 45.54% were non-families. 32.10% of all households were made up of individuals, and 14.30% had someone living alone who was 65 years of age or older. The average household size was 1.96 and the average family size was 2.30.

The township's age distribution consisted of 22.4% under the age of 18, 0.0% from 18 to 24, 34.7% from 25 to 44, 2.3% from 45 to 64, and 40.6% who were 65 years of age or older. The median age was 41.0 years. For every 100 females, there were 160.7 males. For every 100 females age 18 and over, there were 129.7 males.

The median income for a household in the township was $67,791, and the median income for a family was $69,273. Males had a median income of $31,705 versus $21,012 for females. The per capita income for the township was $26,162. About 0.0% of families and 2.9% of the population were below the poverty line, including 0.0% of those under age 18 and 6.7% of those age 65 or over.

Historical population
Census	Pop.	Note	%±
2000	280		—
2010	224		−20.0%
2020	215		−4.0%
U.S. Decennial Census

== School districts ==
- Pearl City Community Unit School District 200
- Stockton Community Unit School District 206

== Political districts ==
- Illinois' 16th congressional district
- State House District 89
- State Senate District 45
