= Elmoville, Illinois =

- Unincorporated community
- Location within Illinois Location within the United States
- Coordinates: 42°15′56″N 90°02′49″W
- Country: United States
- State: Illinois
- County: Jo Daviess
- Elevation: 718 ft (219 m)
- Time zone: UTC-6 (Central (CST))
  - Summer (DST): UTC-5 (CDT)
- Zip: 61029
- Area codes: 815 & 779
- GNIS feature ID: 422666

Elmoville is an unincorporated community in Jo Daviess County, Illinois, United States.
