= The Galena Territory, Illinois =

- Census-designated place
- Logo

- Location within Illinois Location within the United States
- Coordinates: 42°23′36″N 90°19′33″W
- Country: United States
- State: Illinois
- County: Jo Daviess
- Incorporated: July 26, 1973

Area
  - Total: 11.36 sq mi (29.41 km^{2})
  - Land: 11.01 sq mi (28.52 km^{2})
  - Water: 0.34 sq mi (0.89 km^{2})
- Elevation: 899 ft (274 m)

Population (2020)
  - Total: 1,500
  - Estimate (2024): 1,750
  - Density: 136/sq mi (52.6/km^{2})
- Time zone: UTC-6 (Central (CST))
  - Summer (DST): UTC-5 (CDT)
- ZIP code: 61036
- Area code: 815 779
- GNIS feature ID: 2583443
- Website: thegalenaterritory.com

The Galena Territory is a census-designated place in Jo Daviess County, Illinois, United States. Its population was 1,500 in 2020, an increase from 1,058 in the 2010 census. The territory was incorporated on July 26, 1973.

The community consists of a private 6,800-acre (28 km^{2}) development located several miles southeast of downtown Galena. The Territory, which is managed by a homeowners association, has set aside 1,500 acres (6.1 km^{2}) of protected recreational land. The remainder is filled with low-density residential development and Eagle Ridge Resort & Spa. As of August 2017, there were 4,082 property owners, 554 permanent residences, and 1,675 vacation residences.

== Geography ==
According to the 2021 census gazetteer files, The Galena Territory has a total area of 11.36 square miles (29.42 km^{2}), of which 11.01 square miles (28.52 km^{2}) (or 96.97%) is land and 0.34 square miles (0.88 km^{2}) (or 3.03%) is water.

== Demographics ==
=== 2020 census ===
As of the 2020 census, The Galena Territory had a population of 1,500. The median age was 65.5 years. 9.1% of residents were under the age of 18 and 51.2% of residents were 65 years of age or older. For every 100 females there were 91.6 males, and for every 100 females age 18 and over there were 90.5 males age 18 and over.

0.0% of residents lived in urban areas, while 100.0% lived in rural areas.

There were 753 households in The Galena Territory, of which 11.8% had children under the age of 18 living in them. Of all households, 66.1% were married-couple households, 12.7% were households with a male householder and no spouse or partner present, and 17.1% were households with a female householder and no spouse or partner present. About 26.3% of all households were made up of individuals and 17.1% had someone living alone who was 65 years of age or older.

There were 576 families residing in the CDP. The population density was 132.10 inhabitants per square mile (51.00/km^{2}), and there were 2,027 housing units at an average density of 178.51 per square mile (68.92/km^{2}).

Of housing units, 62.9% were vacant. The homeowner vacancy rate was 7.1% and the rental vacancy rate was 34.6%.

Racial composition as of the 2020 census
Race	Number	Percent
White	1,407	93.8%
Black or African American	6	0.4%
American Indian and Alaska Native	9	0.6%
Asian	9	0.6%
Native Hawaiian and Other Pacific Islander	0	0.0%
Some other race	13	0.9%
Two or more races	56	3.7%
Hispanic or Latino (of any race)	43	2.9%

=== Income and poverty ===
The median income for a household in the CDP was $103,065, and the median income for a family was $106,667. Males had a median income of $92,353 versus $51,417 for females. The per capita income for the CDP was $62,513. About 1.0% of families and 2.2% of the population were below the poverty line, including none of those under age 18 and 2.8% of those age 65 or over.

Historical population
Census	Pop.	Note	%±
2010	1,058		—
2020	1,500		41.8%
2024 (est.)	1,750	▲	16.7%
U.S. Decennial Census

== Facilities ==
The community includes an owners' club, which houses recreational facilities for property owners and their guests. The pool and recreation complex includes a fitness center, a café, three pools, tennis courts, a basketball court, and a playground. The Galena Territory has also reserved about 1,500 acres of greenspace with over 40 miles of trails running throughout the territory. Several trails take hikers by a historically significant site known as the Belden School, a one-room schoolhouse built in 1859. These areas of the territory will be left undeveloped to conserve the natural environment. A riding center offers horseback riding, along with other activities, including trail rides and riding lessons.

=== Lake Galena and marina ===
Lake Galena is a man-made reservoir within the Galena Territory. It is mostly used for recreational purposes including boating and fishing. The lake is managed by the Galena Territory Association along with the marina located on the east end of the lake.

== Eagle Ridge Resort & Spa ==
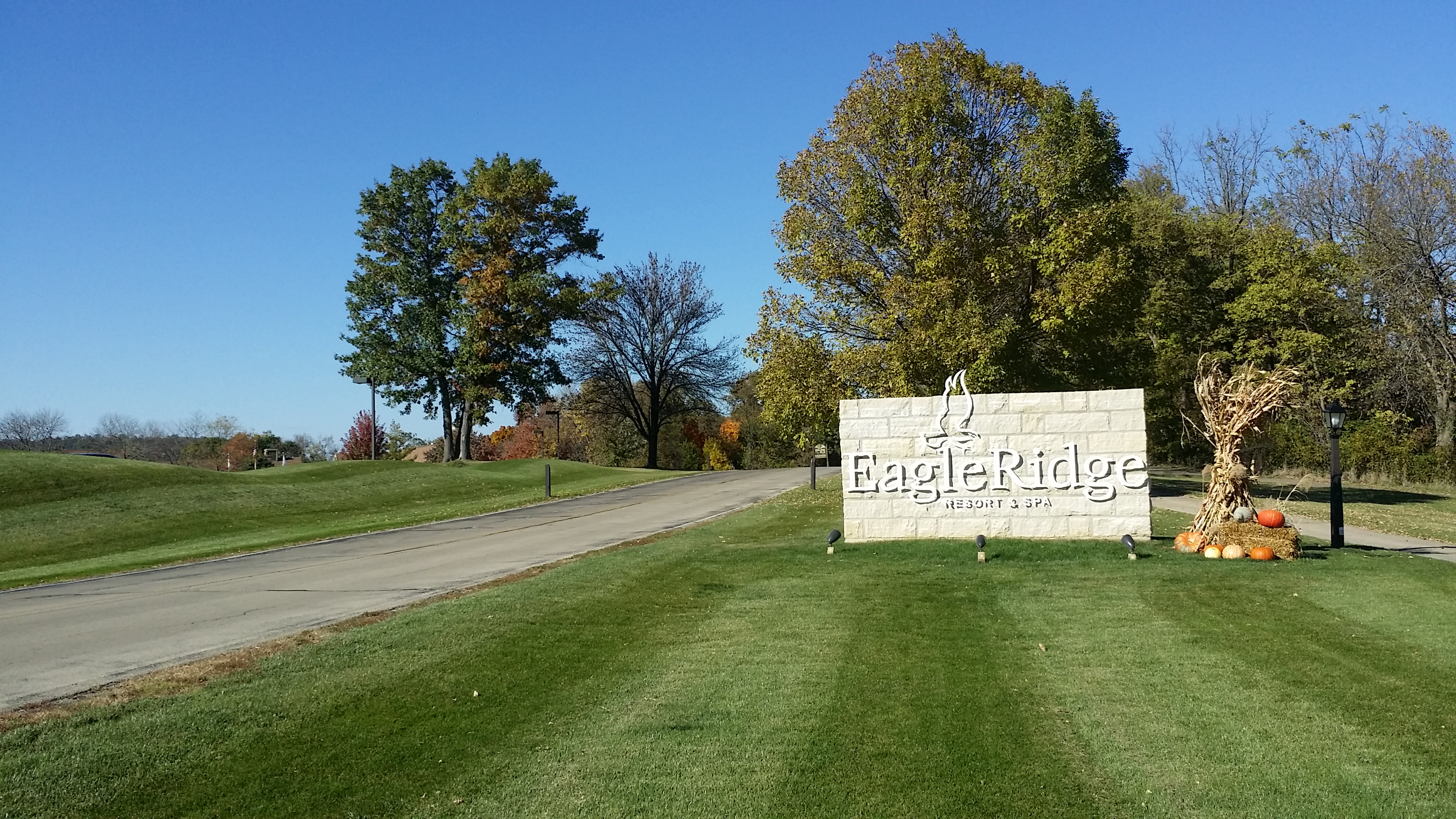
Eagle Ridge Resort

Eagle Ridge Resort & Spa is located lakeside in the center of the Galena Territory. There are 80 rooms in the main lodge, and over 300 private villas. The resort is best known for its 63 holes of championship golf, including "The General", which Golf Digest ranked No. 41 in its 2007-2008 list of "America's 100 Greatest Public Golf Courses."

== Government services ==
While the Galena Territory Association operates within its bylaws to administer the area as a property owners' association, the area of the Galena Territory consists of two government townships: East Galena and Guilford townships.

The Galena Territory is covered by three school districts: Galena Unit School District 120, operating a primary, middle and high school for students in East Galena Township; Scales Mound Community Unit School District 211, operating an elementary, junior high, and high school for students in the northern portion of the Galena Territory; and River Ridge Community Unit School District 210, operating an elementary, middle, and high school for the remainder of students and majority of the Galena Territory.

Located inside the Galena Territory is the Galena Territory Fire Station, the Scales Mound Fire Protection District's second station, which provides structural and wildland firefighting, ice and water rescue, and non-transport emergency medical services (EMS) for the majority of the Galena Territory. The Elizabeth Community Fire Protection District provides firefighting services for a smaller, southern portion of the Galena Territory. Galena Area EMS provides basic life support (BLS) level EMS transport via ambulance for the vast majority of the Galena Territory. The Jo Daviess County Sheriff's Office provides primary law enforcement service to residents, with assistance from Galena Territory Association's Security Department.
