= Hanover Township =

Hanover Township may refer to the following townships in the United States:

== Illinois ==
- Hanover Township, Cook County, Illinois
- Hanover Township, Jo Daviess County, Illinois

== Indiana ==
- Hanover Township, Jefferson County, Indiana
- Hanover Township, Lake County, Indiana
- Hanover Township, Shelby County, Indiana

== Iowa ==
- Hanover Township, Allamakee County, Iowa
- Hanover Township, Crawford County, Iowa

== Kansas ==
- Hanover Township, Lincoln County, Kansas
- Hanover Township, Washington County, Kansas

== Michigan ==
- Hanover Township, Jackson County, Michigan
- Hanover Township, Wexford County, Michigan

== Nebraska ==
- Hanover Township, Adams County, Nebraska
- Hanover Township, Gage County, Nebraska

== New Jersey ==
- Hanover Township, New Jersey

== Ohio ==
- Hanover Township, Ashland County, Ohio
- Hanover Township, Butler County, Ohio
- Hanover Township, Columbiana County, Ohio
- Hanover Township, Licking County, Ohio

== Pennsylvania ==
- Hanover Township, Beaver County, Pennsylvania
- Hanover Township, Lehigh County, Pennsylvania
- Hanover Township, Luzerne County, Pennsylvania
- Hanover Township, Northampton County, Pennsylvania
- Hanover Township, Washington County, Pennsylvania
