= Pleasant Valley Township, Illinois =

Pleasant Valley Township
- Township
- Location in Jo Daviess County

- Jo Daviess County's location in Illinois
- Coordinates: 42°14′35″N 90°02′18″W
- Country: United States
- State: Illinois
- County: Jo Daviess
- Established: November 2, 1852

Government
  - Supervisor: Phyllis Miccolis

Area
  - Total: 36.58 sq mi (94.7 km^{2})
  - Land: 36.58 sq mi (94.7 km^{2})
  - Water: 0 sq mi (0 km^{2}) 0%
- Elevation: 676 ft (206 m)

Population (2020)
  - Total: 215
  - Density: 5.88/sq mi (2.27/km^{2})
- Time zone: UTC-6 (CST)
  - Summer (DST): UTC-5 (CDT)
- ZIP codes: 61028, 61053, 61085
- FIPS code: 17-085-60664

Pleasant Valley Township is one of 23 townships in Jo Daviess County, Illinois, United States. As of the 2020 census, its population was 215 and it contained 142 housing units.

== Geography ==
According to the 2021 census gazetteer files, Pleasant Valley Township has a total area of 36.58 square miles (94.74 km^{2}), all land.

=== Cemeteries ===
The township contains Plum River Catholic Cemetery. This Cemetery was originally St Patrick's Catholic Cemetery attached to the north to a church with the same name. That church was eliminated about 1936 by Father Anthony Schumecht. The cemetery has been GPR'd and an ArcGIS database published. https://arcg.is/1X8vH9 . About 50 graves have been located without identification.

=== Major highways ===
- Illinois Route 78 north towards Stockton and south towards Mount Carroll

== Demographics ==
As of the 2020 census there were 215 people, 107 households, and 79 families residing in the township. The population density was 5.88 inhabitants per square mile (2.27/km^{2}). There were 142 housing units at an average density of 3.88 per square mile (1.50/km^{2}). The racial makeup of the township was 93.95% White, 0.00% African American, 0.93% Native American, 0.00% Asian, 0.00% Pacific Islander, 0.47% from other races, and 4.65% from two or more races. Hispanic or Latino people of any race were 2.33% of the population.

There were 107 households, out of which 4.70% had children under the age of 18 living with them, 65.42% were married couples living together, 8.41% had a female householder with no spouse present, and 26.17% were non-families. 26.20% of all households were made up of individuals, and 0.00% had someone living alone who was 65 years of age or older. The average household size was 1.84 and the average family size was 2.14.

The township's age distribution consisted of 5.1% under the age of 18, 0.0% from 18 to 24, 10.2% from 25 to 44, 25.4% from 45 to 64, and 59.4% who were 65 years of age or older. The median age was 66.5 years. For every 100 females, there were 101.0 males. For every 100 females age 18 and over, there were 90.8 males.

The median income for a household in the township was $66,012, and the median income for a family was $72,875. Males had a median income of $23,750 versus $21,719 for females. The per capita income for the township was $42,905. None of the population were below the poverty line.

Historical population
| Census | Pop. | Note | %± |
|---|---|---|---|
| 2000 | 327 | | — |
| 2010 | 273 | | −16.5% |
| 2020 | 215 | | −21.2% |
U.S. Decennial Census

== School districts ==
- Stockton Community Unit School District 206
- West Carroll Community Unit School District 314

== Political districts ==
- Illinois's 17th congressional district
- State House District 89
- State Senate District 45
