= Jo Daviess County, Illinois =

County in Illinois, United States

- County
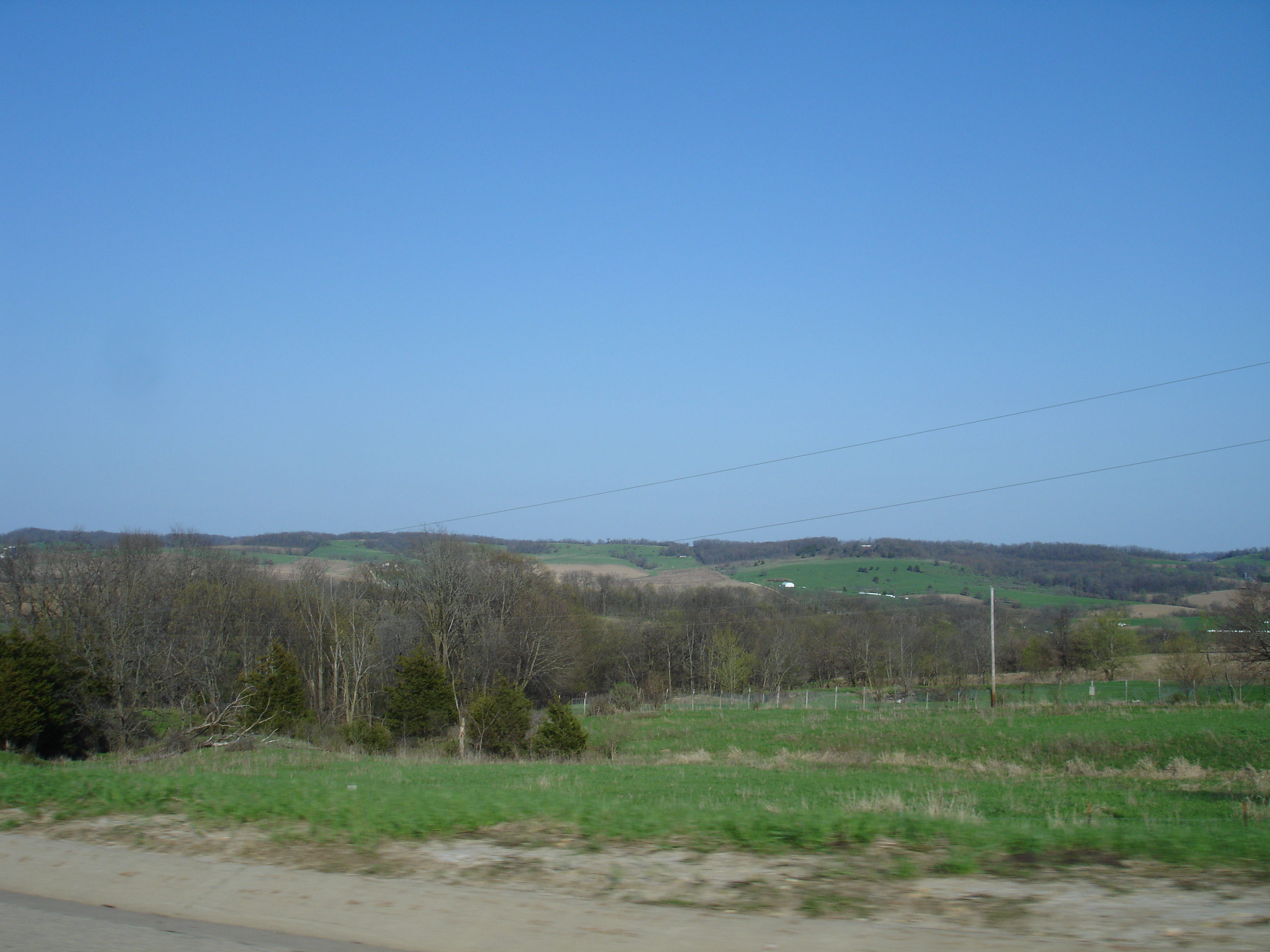
- Hill terrain in the county, part of the Driftless Area

- Location within the U.S. state of Illinois
- Coordinates: 42°22′N 90°13′W
- Country: United States
- State: Illinois
- Founded: 1827
- Named for: Joseph Hamilton Daveiss
- Seat: Galena
- Largest city: Galena

Area
  - Total: 619 sq mi (1,600 km^{2})
  - Land: 601 sq mi (1,560 km^{2})
  - Water: 18 sq mi (47 km^{2}) 2.9%

Population (2020)
  - Total: 22,035
  - Estimate (2025): 21,594 ▼
  - Density: 36.7/sq mi (14.2/km^{2})
- Time zone: UTC−6 (Central)
  - Summer (DST): UTC−5 (CDT)
- Congressional district: 16th
- Website: www.jodaviesscountyil.gov

Jo Daviess County (/ˈdeɪvɪs/) is the northwesternmost county in the U.S. state of Illinois. According to the 2020 census, it had a population of 22,035. Its county seat is Galena. Jo Daviess County is part of the Tri-State Area and is located near Dubuque, Iowa and Platteville, Wisconsin. As part of the Driftless Area, Jo Daviess County contains rugged terrain compared to the rest of the state. Within Jo Daviess County lies Charles Mound, the highest natural point in Illinois, as well as eight of the ten highest points in Illinois.

== History ==
Jo Daviess County was formed in 1827 out of Henry and Putnam counties. It is named for Maj. Joseph Hamilton Daveiss, United States Attorney for Kentucky, who was killed in 1811 at the Battle of Tippecanoe. The local pronunciation is "Davis". Jo Daviess County was founded exclusively by immigrants from New England. These were old stock "Yankee" immigrants, meaning they were descended from the English Puritans who settled New England in the 1600s. The completion of the Erie Canal caused a surge in New England immigration to what was then the Northwest Territory.

The end of the Black Hawk War led to an additional surge of immigration, once again coming almost exclusively from the six New England states as a result of overpopulation combined with land shortages in that region. Some of these later settlers were from upstate New York and had parents who had moved to that region from New England shortly after the Revolutionary War. New Englanders and New England transplants from upstate New York were the vast majority of Jo Daviess County's inhabitants during the first several decades of its history. These settlers were primarily members of the Congregational Church though due to the Second Great Awakening many of them had converted to Methodism and some had become Baptists before coming to what is now Jo Daviess County. The Congregational Church subsequently went through many divisions and some factions, including those in Jo Daviess County that affiliated with the Church of Christ and the United Church of Christ.

As a result of this heritage the vast majority of inhabitants in Jo Daviess County, much like antebellum New England were overwhelmingly in favor of the abolitionist movement during the decades leading up to the Civil War.

In the late 1880s and early 1890s Irish and German migrants began moving into Jo Daviess County, most of these later immigrants did not move directly from Ireland and Germany, but rather from other areas in the Midwest where they had been living, particularly the state of Ohio.

=== County border changes ===
- 1830 – The northern border of Illinois and Wisconsin was formally established. Until that time, several Wisconsin towns actually were under the jurisdiction of Jo Daviess County.
- 1831 – Rock Island County was formed from a part of the county, along with a new northern extension of Henry County and Putnam County.
- 1836 – Whiteside, Ogle, and Winnebago counties were formed from the southern and eastern sections of the county.
- 1837 – Stephenson County was formed from the eastern section of the county.
- 1839 – Carroll County was formed from the southern section of the county.
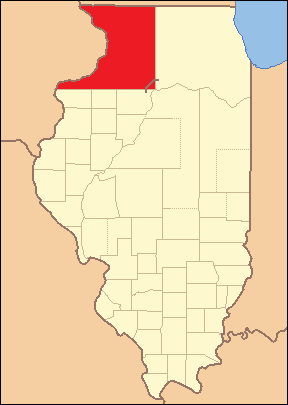
Jo Daviess County at the time of its creation to 1831 (Wisconsin border adjustment not shown)

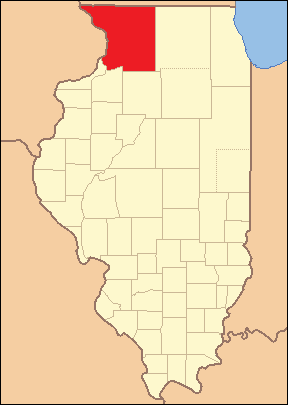
Jo Daviess between 1831 and 1836

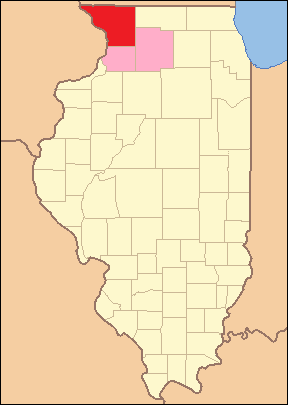
Jo Daviess between 1836 and 1837. Whiteside and Ogle counties remained temporarily attached to Jo Daviess until county governments could be organized.

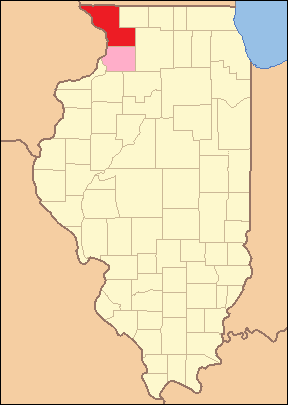
Jo Daviess between 1837 and 1839

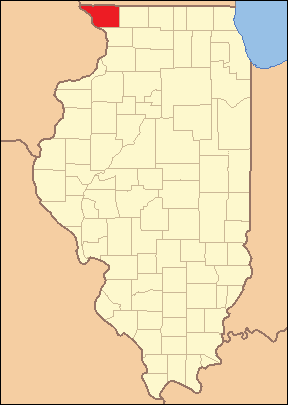
Jo Daviess reduced to its current size in 1839 by the creation of Carroll County and the organization of a government in Whiteside County

== Geography ==
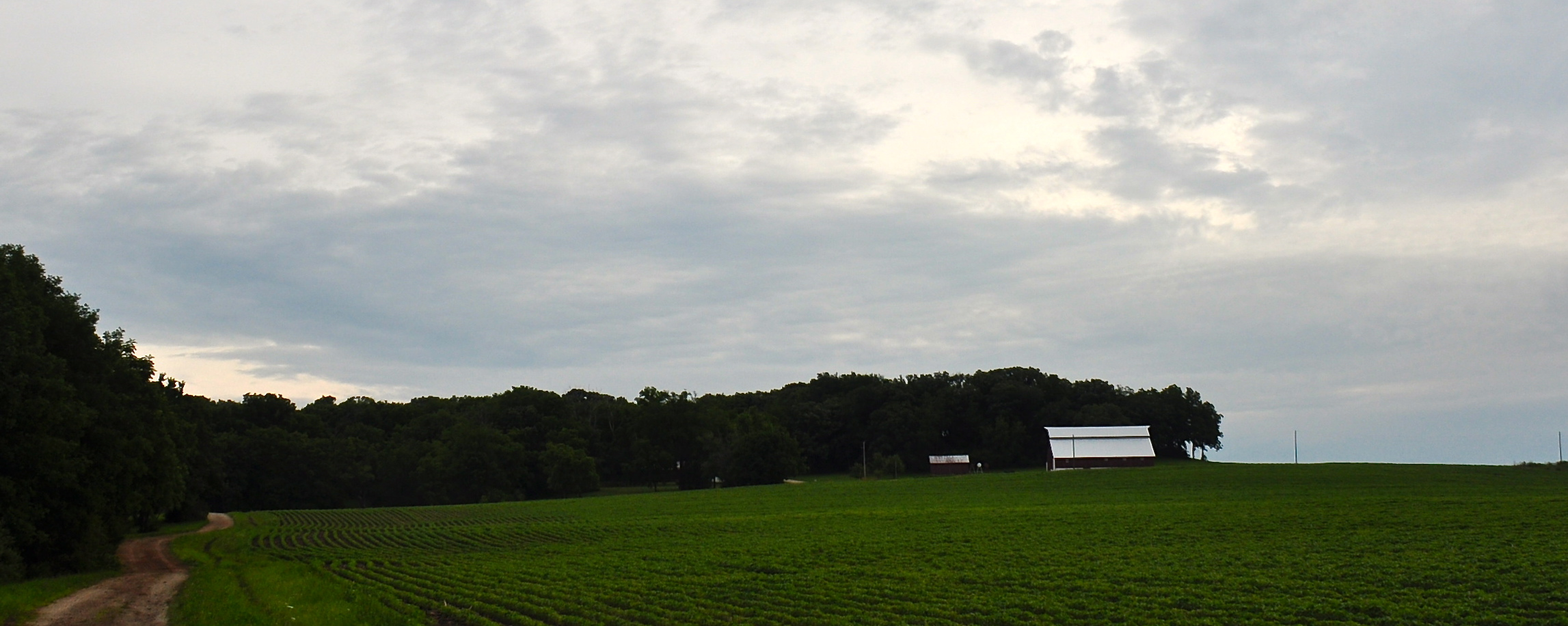
Charles Mound, the highest natural point in Illinois at 1,235 ft (376 m), is located near Scales Mound in Jo Daviess County.

According to the U.S. Census Bureau, the county has a total area of 619 square miles (1,600 km^{2}), of which 601 square miles (1,560 km^{2}) is land and 18 square miles (47 km^{2}) (2.9%) is water.

=== Climate and weather ===
Galena, Illinois

Climate chart (precipitation, max. and min. temperature)
J	F	M	A	M	J	J	A	S	O	N	D
1.1 27 9	1.3 33 14	2.3 45 25	3.3 59 36	3.7 71 47	4.6 81 57	3.3 84 62	4.4 82 60	3.6 74 51	2.5 62 39	2.6 45 27	1.6 32 16
- █ Average max. and min. temperatures in °F
- █ Precipitation totals in inches
- Source: The Weather Channel
Metric conversion
J	F	M	A	M	J	J	A	S	O	N	D
29 −3 −13	32 1 −10	58 7 −4	84 15 2	95 22 8	116 27 14	85 29 17	111 28 16	92 23 11	64 17 4	66 7 −3	41 0 −9
- █ Average max. and min. temperatures in °C
- █ Precipitation totals in mm

In recent years, average temperatures in the county seat of Galena have ranged from a low of 9 °F (−13 °C) in January to a high of 84 °F (29 °C) in July, although a record low of −35 °F (−37 °C) was recorded in February 1996 and a record high of 103 °F (39 °C) was recorded in August 1988. Average monthly precipitation ranged from 1.14 inches (29 mm) in January to 4.58 inches (116 mm) in June.

=== Major highways ===
In Illinois, US 20 is designated the General Ulysses S. Grant Highway (often abbreviated the U.S. Grant Memorial Highway) and is the longest route in the United States. In eastern Jo Daviess County US 20 is one of the few areas that remain two-lane across the entire stretch of US 20. The road between Dubuque and Stockton was once known as the most dangerous stretch of road because of the hills and curves flanked by cliffs and valleys. Travelers were greeted with signs reminding them to drive carefully as they entered this stretch of road.

- U.S. Route 20
- Illinois Route 35
- Illinois Route 78
- Illinois Route 84

=== Adjacent counties ===
- Lafayette County, Wisconsin - north
- Stephenson County - east
- Carroll County - south
- Jackson County, Iowa - southwest
- Dubuque County, Iowa - west
- Grant County, Wisconsin - northwest

=== National protected area ===
- Upper Mississippi River National Wildlife and Fish Refuge (part)

=== State protected area ===
- Apple River Canyon State Park

=== Locally protected area ===
Several areas are protected by the charitable organization Jo Daviess Conservation Foundation:

- Buehler Preserve
- Casper Bluff Land & Water Reserve
- Horseshoe Mound
- Schurmeier Teaching Forest
- Valley of Eden Bird Sanctuary
- Wapello Land & Water Reserve

== Demographics ==
Historical population
Census	Pop.	Note	%±
1830	2,111		—
1840	6,180		192.8%
1850	18,604		201.0%
1860	27,325		46.9%
1870	27,820		1.8%
1880	27,528		−1.0%
1890	25,101		−8.8%
1900	24,533		−2.3%
1910	22,657		−7.6%
1920	21,917		−3.3%
1930	20,235		−7.7%
1940	19,989		−1.2%
1950	21,459		7.4%
1960	21,821		1.7%
1970	21,766		−0.3%
1980	23,520		8.1%
1990	21,821		−7.2%
2000	22,289		2.1%
2010	22,678		1.7%
2020	22,035		−2.8%
2025 (est.)	21,594	▼	−2.0%
U.S. Decennial Census; 1790-1960 1900-1990; 1990-2000 2010

2000 census age pyramid for Jo Daviess County

=== 2020 census ===
Jo Daviess County, Illinois – racial and ethnic composition Note: the US Census treats Hispanic/Latino as an ethnic category. This table excludes Latinos from the racial categories and assigns them to a separate category. Hispanics/Latinos may be of any race.
Race / ethnicity (NH = Non-Hispanic)	Pop 1980	Pop 1990	Pop 2000	Pop 2010	Pop 2020	% 1980	% 1990	% 2000	% 2010	% 2020
White alone (NH)	23,320	21,670	21,733	21,681	20,354	99.15%	99.31%	97.51%	95.60%	92.37%
Black or African American alone (NH)	12	13	41	100	114	0.05%	0.06%	0.18%	0.44%	0.52%
Native American or Alaska Native alone (NH)	19	19	21	29	31	0.08%	0.09%	0.09%	0.13%	0.14%
Asian alone (NH)	39	25	36	72	96	0.17%	0.11%	0.16%	0.32%	0.44%
Native Hawaiian or Pacific Islander alone (NH)	x	x	1	7	6	x	x	0.00%	0.03%	0.03%
Other race alone (NH)	8	0	9	6	52	0.03%	0.00%	0.04%	0.03%	0.24%
Mixed-race or multiracial (NH)	x	x	106	174	526	x	x	0.48%	0.77%	2.39%
Hispanic or Latino (any race)	122	94	342	609	856	0.52%	0.43%	1.53%	2.69%	3.88%
Total	23,520	21,821	22,289	22,678	22,035	100.00%	100.00%	100.00%	100.00%	100.00%

As of the 2020 census, the county had a population of 22,035. The median age was 50.1 years. 19.2% of residents were under the age of 18 and 28.0% of residents were 65 years of age or older. For every 100 females there were 100.5 males, and for every 100 females age 18 and over there were 98.5 males age 18 and over.

The racial makeup of the county was 93.4% White, 0.5% Black or African American, 0.3% American Indian and Alaska Native, 0.4% Asian, <0.1% Native Hawaiian and Pacific Islander, 1.5% from some other race, and 3.8% from two or more races. Hispanic or Latino residents of any race comprised 3.9% of the population.

11.6% of residents lived in urban areas, while 88.4% lived in rural areas.

There were 9,827 households in the county, of which 22.9% had children under the age of 18 living in them. Of all households, 51.3% were married-couple households, 18.6% were households with a male householder and no spouse or partner present, and 23.5% were households with a female householder and no spouse or partner present. About 31.1% of all households were made up of individuals and 16.5% had someone living alone who was 65 years of age or older.

There were 13,408 housing units, of which 26.7% were vacant. Among occupied housing units, 79.1% were owner-occupied and 20.9% were renter-occupied. The homeowner vacancy rate was 2.6% and the rental vacancy rate was 12.5%.

=== 2010 census ===
As of the 2010 United States census, there were 22,678 people, 9,753 households, and 6,514 families residing in the county. The population density was 37.7 inhabitants per square mile (14.6/km^{2}). There were 13,574 housing units at an average density of 22.6 per square mile (8.7/km^{2}). The racial makeup of the county was 97.2% White, 0.5% Black or African American, 0.3% Asian, 0.2% American Indian, 0.9% from other races, and 0.9% from two or more races. Those of Hispanic or Latino origin made up 2.7% of the population. In terms of ancestry, 49.4% were German, 19.7% were Irish, 11.1% were English, and 8.5% were American.

Of the 9,753 households, 25.3% had children under the age of 18 living with them, 55.9% were married couples living together, 7% had a female householder with no husband present, 33.2% were non-families, and 28.4% of all households were made up of individuals. The average household size was 2.31 and the average family size was 2.81. The median age was 47.1 years.

The median income for a household in the county was $50,279 and the median income for a family was $60,381. Males had a median income of $38,372 versus $29,412 for females. The per capita income for the county was $26,819. About 5.6% of families and 8.4% of the population were below the poverty line, including 11.5% of those under age 18 and 6.4% of those age 65 or over.

== Communities ==
=== Cities ===
- East Dubuque 1505
- Galena (county seat) 3308
- Stockton 1728

=== Villages ===
- Apple River
- Elizabeth
- Hanover
- Menominee
- Nora
- Scales Mound
- Warren

=== Census-designated places ===
- Apple Canyon Lake
- The Galena Territory

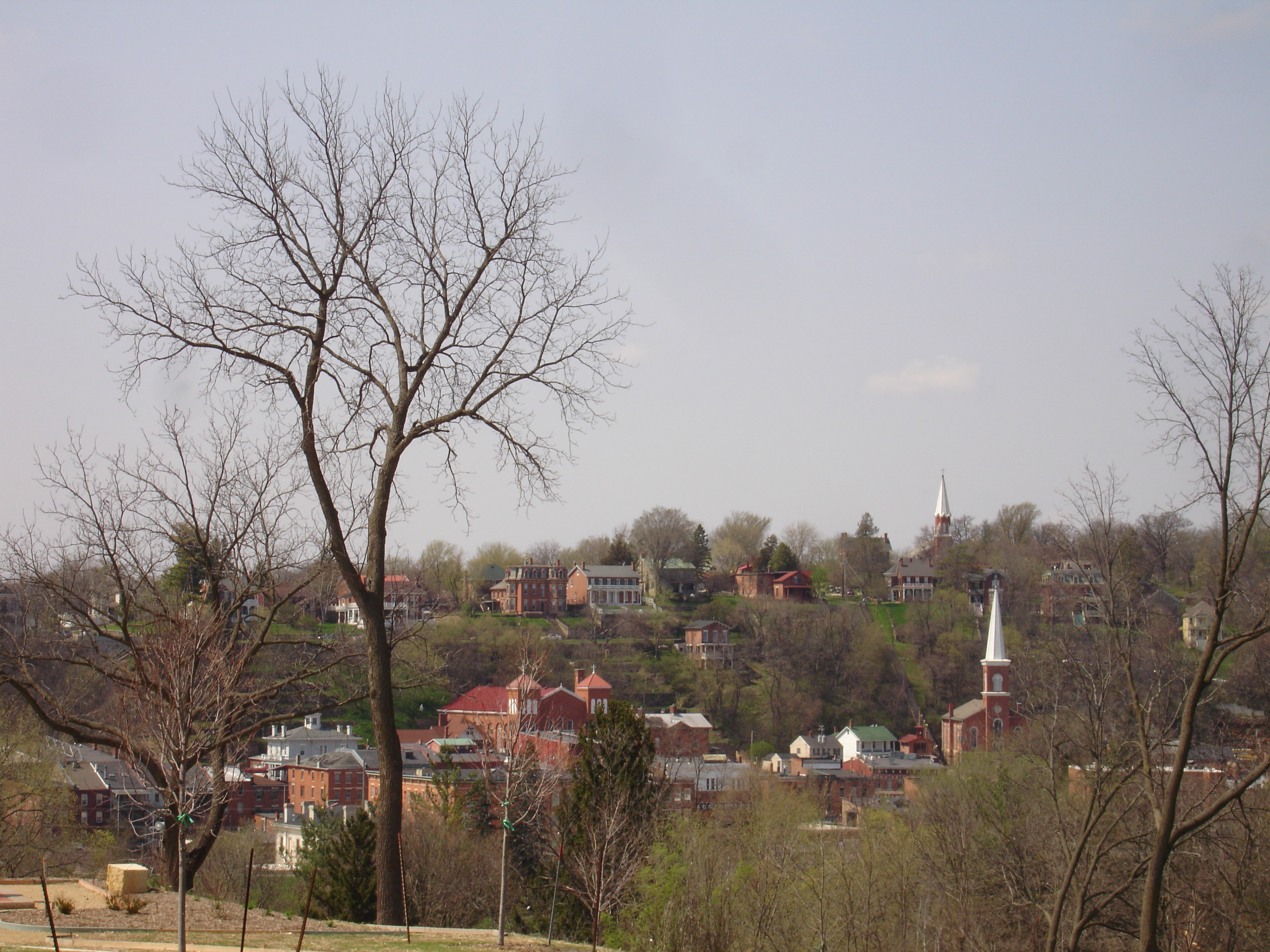
Downtown Galena (the county seat) viewed from the U.S. Grant Home

=== Townships ===
Jo Daviess County is divided into twenty-three townships:

- Apple River
- Berreman
- Council Hill
- Derinda
- Dunleith
- East Galena
- Elizabeth
- Guilford
- Hanover
- Menominee
- Nora
- Pleasant Valley
- Rawlins
- Rice
- Rush
- Scales Mound
- Stockton
- Thompson
- Vinegar Hill
- Wards Grove
- Warren
- West Galena
- Woodbine

=== Unincorporated communities ===
- Bremen
- Council Hill
- Elmoville
- Guilford
- Massbach
- Morseville
- Pleasant Valley
- Rice
- Schapville
- Whitton
- Willow
- Woodbine

=== Historic site ===
- Apple River Fort

== Government and politics ==
United States presidential election results for Jo Daviess County, Illinois
Year	Republican		Democratic		Third party(ies)	
Year	No.	%	No.	%	No.	%
1892	2,680	46.69%	2,793	48.66%	267	4.65%
1896	3,594	58.36%	2,391	38.83%	173	2.81%
1900	3,444	56.06%	2,543	41.40%	156	2.54%
1904	3,388	63.11%	1,598	29.77%	382	7.12%
1908	3,132	54.57%	2,310	40.25%	297	5.18%
1912	1,233	22.58%	2,226	40.77%	2,001	36.65%
1916	5,775	59.98%	3,505	36.40%	349	3.62%
1920	6,098	76.25%	1,604	20.06%	295	3.69%
1924	4,864	50.36%	1,477	15.29%	3,318	34.35%
1928	6,333	61.59%	3,856	37.50%	94	0.91%
1932	4,520	44.41%	5,497	54.01%	160	1.57%
1936	5,619	51.32%	5,079	46.38%	252	2.30%
1940	7,285	65.09%	3,864	34.52%	43	0.38%
1944	6,465	65.99%	3,298	33.66%	34	0.35%
1948	5,299	61.83%	3,220	37.57%	51	0.60%
1952	7,132	71.30%	2,858	28.57%	13	0.13%
1956	6,762	69.81%	2,906	30.00%	18	0.19%
1960	6,111	58.66%	4,293	41.21%	13	0.12%
1964	4,607	48.88%	4,818	51.12%	0	0.00%
1968	5,563	59.13%	3,228	34.31%	617	6.56%
1972	5,763	63.35%	3,318	36.47%	16	0.18%
1976	5,478	56.90%	3,979	41.33%	171	1.78%
1980	5,186	57.81%	2,678	29.85%	1,107	12.34%
1984	5,877	63.18%	3,348	35.99%	77	0.83%
1988	4,923	53.88%	4,141	45.32%	73	0.80%
1992	4,249	40.64%	4,044	38.68%	2,161	20.67%
1996	3,915	42.07%	4,171	44.82%	1,220	13.11%
2000	5,304	51.39%	4,585	44.42%	433	4.19%
2004	6,174	53.30%	5,311	45.85%	99	0.85%
2008	5,170	44.00%	6,403	54.49%	177	1.51%
2012	5,534	48.42%	5,667	49.58%	228	1.99%
2016	6,121	54.01%	4,462	39.37%	751	6.63%
2020	7,166	57.21%	5,109	40.79%	250	2.00%
2024	7,136	57.22%	5,051	40.50%	285	2.29%

Jo Daviess County has a fairly typical Yankee Northern Illinois political history, although it has generally voted more Democratic than nearby rural counties. It voted Democratic only four times between 1856 and 1992: for Grover Cleveland in 1892, Woodrow Wilson in 1912, Franklin D. Roosevelt in 1932, and Lyndon B. Johnson in 1964. Between 1996 and 2016 Jo Daviess was a swing county, voting for the national winner each time.

== Education ==
School districts (all K-12) are:

- East Dubuque Community Unit School District 119
- Galena Unit School District 120
- River Ridge Community Unit School District 210
- Scales Mound Community Unit School District 211
- Stockton Community Unit School District 206
- Warren Community Unit School District 205

== See also ==
- National Register of Historic Places listings in Jo Daviess County, Illinois
- Stagecoach Trail
