= Woodbine, Illinois =

Woodbine
- Unincorporated community
- Location of Woodbine within Illinois Woodbine (the United States)
- Coordinates: 42°20′32″N 90°08′43″W
- Country: United States
- State: Illinois
- County: Jo Daviess
- Township: Woodbine
- Elevation: 843 ft (257 m)
- Time zone: UTC-6 (CST)
  - Summer (DST): UTC-5 (CDT)
- Postal code: 61028, 61090
- Area codes: 815 & 779
- GNIS feature ID: 421416

Woodbine is an unincorporated community in Woodbine Township, Jo Daviess County, Illinois, United States. It lies east of Elizabeth and west of Stockton along U.S. Route 20, in the Driftless Zone. Woodbine features a mechanic shop, a championship golf course, two specialty shops and Grace Bible Church.
