= Horse Bluff =

Cliff in the U.S. state of Wisconsin

Coordinates: 43°35′44″N 90°08′47″W

Horse Bluff is a cliff in the U.S. state of Wisconsin. The elevation is 988 feet (301 m).

According to tradition, Horse Bluff was named when a saddled horse was found there but its owner never could be located.
