= Stockton Township, Illinois =

Stockton Township
- Township
- Location in Jo Daviess County

- Jo Daviess County's location in Illinois
- Coordinates: 42°19′45″N 90°02′23″W
- Country: United States
- State: Illinois
- County: Jo Daviess
- Established: November 2, 1852

Government
  - Supervisor: Jon "Jack" Townsend

Area
  - Total: 37.09 sq mi (96.1 km^{2})
  - Land: 37.09 sq mi (96.1 km^{2})
  - Water: 0 sq mi (0 km^{2}) 0%
- Elevation: 876 ft (267 m)

Population (2020)
  - Total: 2,282
  - Density: 61.53/sq mi (23.76/km^{2})
- Time zone: UTC-6 (CST)
  - Summer (DST): UTC-5 (CDT)
- ZIP code: 61085
- FIPS code: 17-085-72793

Stockton Township is one of 23 townships in Jo Daviess County, Illinois, United States. As of the 2020 census, its population was 2,282 and it contained 1,133 housing units.

== Geography ==
According to the 2021 census gazetteer files, Stockton Township has a total area of 37.09 square miles (96.06 km^{2}), all land.

=== Cities, towns, villages ===
- Village of Stockton

==== Lost settlements ====
- Morseville
- Pitcherville
- Yankee Hollow

=== Cemeteries ===
The township contains:

- Holy Cross Catholic Cemetery
- Ladies Union Cemetery

=== Major highways ===
- U.S. Route 20 - running east-west
- Illinois Route 78 - running north-south

=== Airports and landing strips ===
- John L Coppernoll Airport (4LL3)
- Stockton Airport (IS37)

== Demographics ==
As of the 2020 census there were 2,282 people, 970 households, and 619 families residing in the township. The population density was 61.53 inhabitants per square mile (23.76/km^{2}). There were 1,133 housing units at an average density of 30.55 per square mile (11.80/km^{2}). The racial makeup of the township was 94.74% White, 0.61% African American, 0.13% Native American, 0.48% Asian, 0.00% Pacific Islander, 0.39% from other races, and 3.64% from two or more races. Hispanic or Latino of any race were 2.98% of the population.

There were 970 households, out of which 30.60% had children under the age of 18 living with them, 41.96% were married couples living together, 17.11% had a female householder with no spouse present, and 36.19% were non-families. 31.00% of all households were made up of individuals, and 16.80% had someone living alone who was 65 years of age or older. The average household size was 2.10 and the average family size was 2.57.

The township's age distribution consisted of 22.6% under the age of 18, 4.0% from 18 to 24, 21.8% from 25 to 44, 26% from 45 to 64, and 25.5% who were 65 years of age or older. The median age was 45.8 years. For every 100 females, there were 91.2 males. For every 100 females age 18 and over, there were 78.1 males.

The median income for a household in the township was $44,394, and the median income for a family was $56,792. Males had a median income of $35,583 versus $17,708 for females. The per capita income for the township was $27,123. About 18.3% of families and 15.2% of the population were below the poverty line, including 22.5% of those under age 18 and 2.2% of those age 65 or over.

Historical population
Census	Pop.	Note	%±
2000	2,451		—
2010	2,453		0.1%
2020	2,282		−7.0%
U.S. Decennial Census

== School districts ==
- Stockton Community Unit School District 206

== Political districts ==
- Illinois's 16th congressional district
- State House District 89
- State Senate District 45
