= Dutch Hollow (Shannon County, Missouri) =

Valley in the American state of Missouri

Coordinates: 37.3725457°N 91.4456955°W

Dutch Hollow is a valley in Shannon County the U.S. state of Missouri.

Dutch Hollow was named for the fact a large share of the first settlers were Germans (Deutsche).
