= Council Hill, Illinois =

- Unincorporated community
- Location within Illinois Location within the United States
- Coordinates: 42.4886153°N 90.3537384°W
- Country: United States
- State: Illinois
- County: Jo Daviess
- Elevation: 922 ft (281 m)
- Time zone: UTC-6 (Central (CST))
  - Summer (DST): UTC-5 (CDT)
- Zip: 61017
- Area codes: 815, 779
- GNIS feature ID: 422584

Council Hill is an unincorporated community in Jo Daviess County, Illinois, United States. Council Hill is a little over 6 miles northeast of the county seat of Galena.

The community was named from a tradition that Native American tribal councils were held near the town site.
