= Hanover Township, Jo Daviess County, Illinois =

Hanover Township
- Township
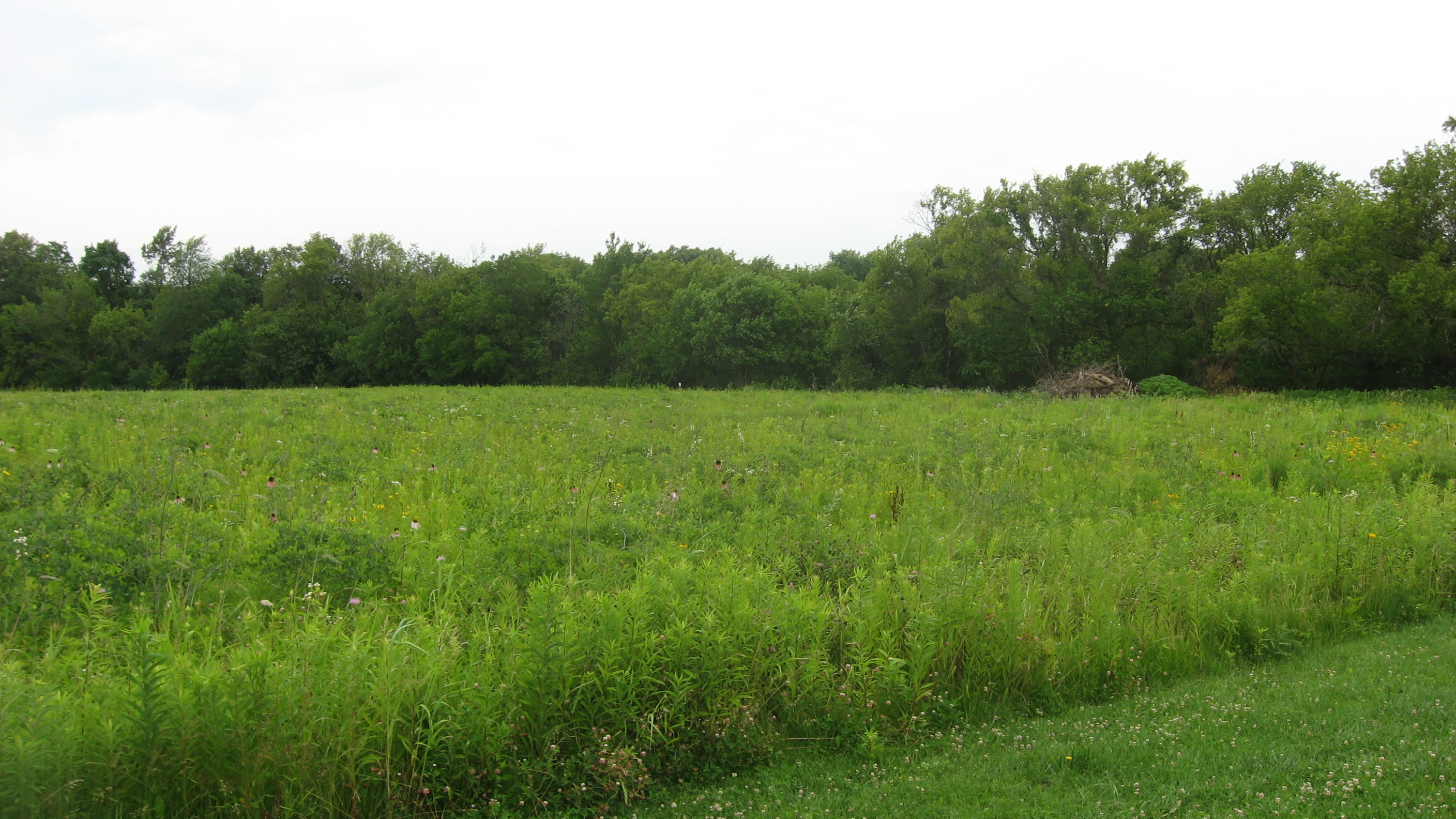
- Scenery at the Wapello Land and Water Reserve

- Location in Jo Daviess County

- Jo Daviess County's location in Illinois
- Coordinates: 42°14′38″N 90°18′05″W
- Country: United States
- State: Illinois
- County: Jo Daviess
- Established: November 2, 1852

Government
  - Supervisor: Janice R. Steele

Area
  - Total: 56.75 sq mi (147.0 km^{2})
  - Land: 52.03 sq mi (134.8 km^{2})
  - Water: 4.72 sq mi (12.2 km^{2}) 8.32%
- Elevation: 876 ft (267 m)

Population (2020)
  - Total: 1,203
  - Density: 23.12/sq mi (8.927/km^{2})
- Time zone: UTC-6 (CST)
  - Summer (DST): UTC-5 (CDT)
- ZIP codes: 61028, 61041, 61074
- FIPS code: 17-085-32720

Hanover Township is one of 23 townships in Jo Daviess County, Illinois, United States. As of the 2020 census, its population was 1,203 and it contained 674 housing units.

== Geography ==
According to the 2021 census gazetteer files, Hanover Township has a total area of 56.75 square miles (146.98 km^{2}), of which 52.03 square miles (134.76 km^{2}) (or 91.68%) is land and 4.72 square miles (12.22 km^{2}) (or 8.32%) is water.

=== Cities, towns, villages ===
- Hanover

=== Cemeteries ===
The township contains Lost Mound Cemetery.

=== Major highways ===
- Illinois Route 84

=== Rivers ===
- Mississippi River

=== Landmarks ===
- Lock and Dam No. 12 of the Mississippi River
- Savanna US Army Depot

== Demographics ==
As of the 2020 census there were 1,203 people, 556 households, and 317 families residing in the township. The population density was 21.20 inhabitants per square mile (8.19/km^{2}). There were 674 housing units at an average density of 11.88 per square mile (4.59/km^{2}). The racial makeup of the township was 90.27% White, 1.50% African American, 0.67% Native American, 0.50% Asian, 0.00% Pacific Islander, 1.50% from other races, and 5.57% from two or more races. Hispanic or Latino of any race were 4.24% of the population.

There were 556 households, out of which 29.00% had children under the age of 18 living with them, 28.96% were married couples living together, 17.99% had a female householder with no spouse present, and 42.99% were non-families. 38.50% of all households were made up of individuals, and 22.80% had someone living alone who was 65 years of age or older. The average household size was 2.01 and the average family size was 2.58.

The township's age distribution consisted of 25.3% under the age of 18, 4.3% from 18 to 24, 23% from 25 to 44, 18.7% from 45 to 64, and 28.8% who were 65 years of age or older. The median age was 41.5 years. For every 100 females, there were 87.6 males. For every 100 females age 18 and over, there were 80.8 males.

The median income for a household in the township was $41,944, and the median income for a family was $55,521. Males had a median income of $40,707 versus $21,283 for females. The per capita income for the township was $23,176. About 21.1% of families and 24.8% of the population were below the poverty line, including 34.3% of those under age 18 and 9.9% of those age 65 or over.

Historical population
Census	Pop.	Note	%±
2000	1,303		—
2010	1,201		−7.8%
2020	1,203		0.2%
U.S. Decennial Census

== School districts ==
- River Ridge Community Unit School District 210

== Political districts ==
- Illinois' 16th congressional district
- State House District 89
- State Senate District 45
