= Lake Redstone =

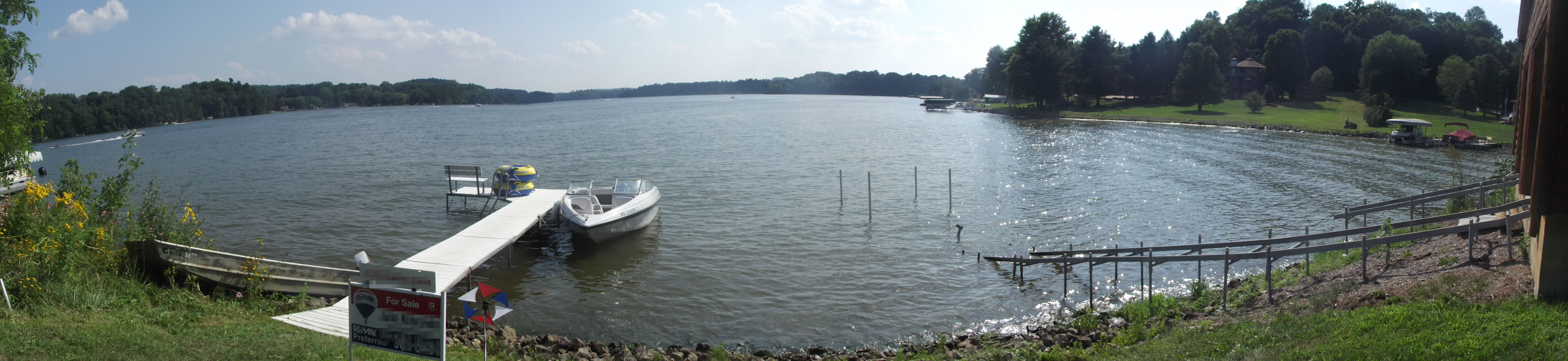
- Panorama of Lake Redstone

- Location within Wisconsin Location within the United States
- Location: Sauk County, Wisconsin
- Coordinates: 43°35′13″N 90°05′17″W
- Type: Artificial lake
- Primary inflows: Big Creek
- Catchment area: 30 sq mi (78 km^{2})
- Basin countries: United States
- Max. length: 3.7 mi (6.0 km)
- Max. width: 0.3 mi (0.5 km)
- Surface area: 612 acres (2.5 km^{2})
- Max. depth: 36 ft (11 m)
- Surface elevation: 916 ft (279 m)

Lake Redstone is a reservoir formed by a dam on Big Creek near La Valle in northern Sauk County of Wisconsin, United States. It was constructed by local lake builder Ike Isaacson in 1964. A county park exists on the south shore, including a beach and waterfall.

The lake's surface area is approximately 650 acres (2.6 km^{2}), with over 17 miles (27 km) of shoreline and 4½ miles long. Lake Redstone has a 19,200-acre (78 km^{2}) watershed to the north from Juneau County that fills the lake. The dam is located at the south end and has a top draw spillway. All excess water creates a cascading waterfall and eventually flows into the Baraboo River.

== History ==
Construction of the lake was started in 1964 by Ike Issacson. It was finished two years later, in 1966.

== Community ==
Lake Redstone has no mandatory owners association, but owners are encouraged to join the Lake Redstone Property Owners Association.
