= Hanover, Illinois =

Hanover
- Village
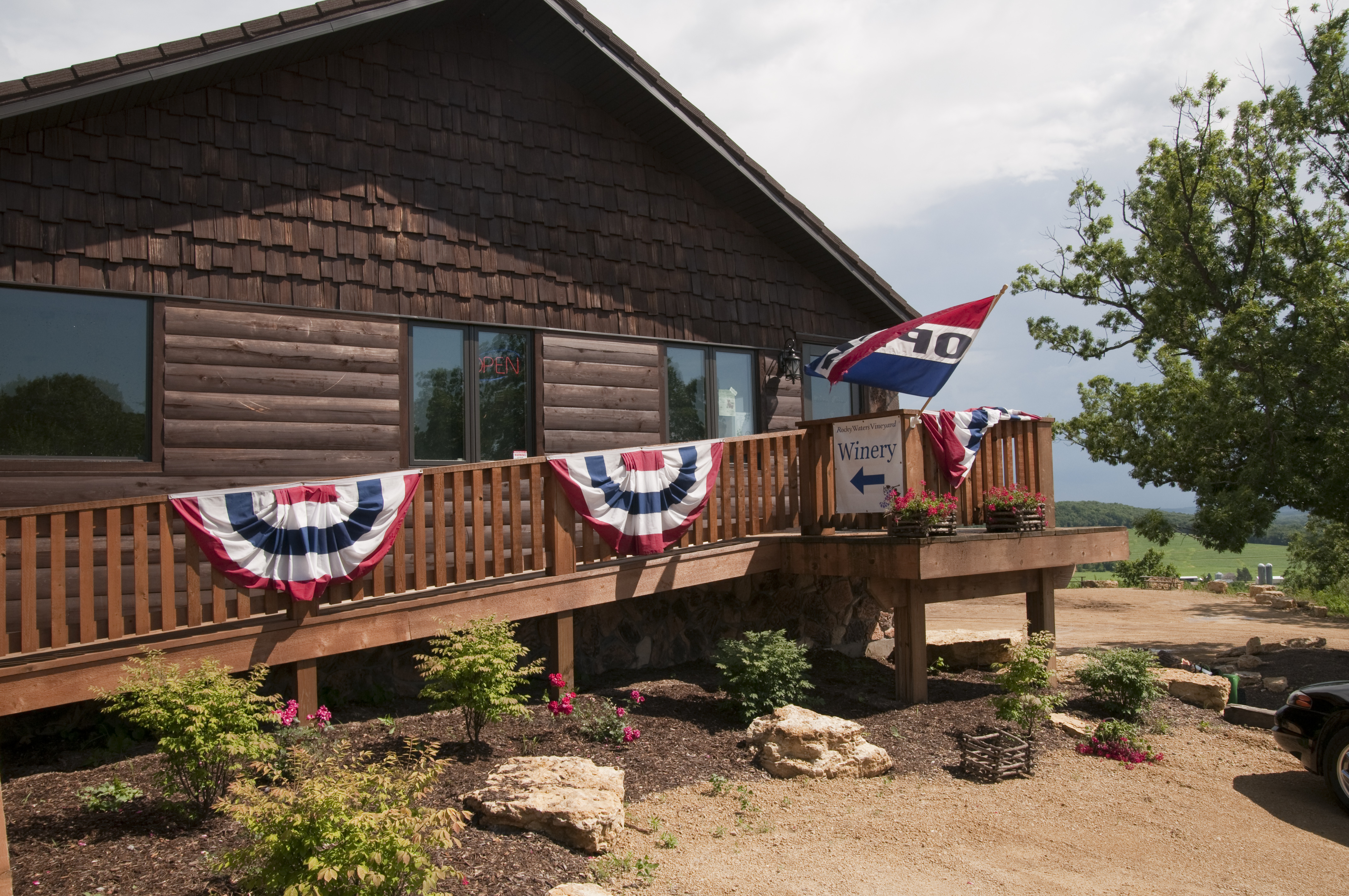

- Logo
- Nicknames: Mallard Capital of the World; Gateway to Jo Daviess County Hills
- Location of Hanover in Jo Daviess County, Illinois
- Coordinates: 42°15′18″N 90°16′10″W
- Country: United States
- State: Illinois
- County: Jo Daviess
- Township: Hanover

Area
  - Total: 1.12 sq mi (2.91 km^{2})
  - Land: 1.12 sq mi (2.91 km^{2})
  - Water: 0 sq mi (0 km^{2})
- Elevation: 640 ft (200 m)

Population (2020)
  - Total: 863
  - Density: 769.0/sq mi (296.91/km^{2})
- Time zone: UTC-6 (CST)
  - Summer (DST): UTC-5 (CDT)
- ZIP Code(s): 61041
- Area code: 815
- FIPS code: 17-32707
- GNIS feature ID: 2398242
- Website: www.hanover-il.com

Hanover is a village in Jo Daviess County, Illinois, United States, along the Apple River. The town was previously named Wapello, in honor of Chief Wapello of the Meskwaki tribe. The population was 863 at the 2020 cenus, up from 844 in 2010.

== Geography ==
According to the 2021 census gazetteer files, Hanover has a total area of 1.12 square miles (2.90 km^{2}), all land. Hanover sits in the northwest corner of Illinois, within five miles of the Mississippi River. Illinois Route 84, part of the scenic Great River Road, passes through the center of town. The Apple River, a tributary of the Mississippi, winds through and around Hanover.

== Demographics ==
Historical population
| Census | Pop. | Note | %± |
|---|---|---|---|
| 1880 | 459 | | — |
| 1890 | 743 | | 61.9% |
| 1900 | 785 | | 5.7% |
| 1910 | 650 | | −17.2% |
| 1920 | 737 | | 13.4% |
| 1930 | 806 | | 9.4% |
| 1940 | 899 | | 11.5% |
| 1950 | 1,643 | | 82.8% |
| 1960 | 1,396 | | −15.0% |
| 1970 | 1,243 | | −11.0% |
| 1980 | 1,069 | | −14.0% |
| 1990 | 908 | | −15.1% |
| 2000 | 836 | | −7.9% |
| 2010 | 844 | | 1.0% |
| 2020 | 863 | | 2.3% |
U.S. Decennial Census

As of the 2020 census there were 863 people, 380 households, and 201 families residing in the village. The population density was 769.16 inhabitants per square mile (296.97/km^{2}). There were 475 housing units at an average density of 423.35 per square mile (163.46/km^{2}). The racial makeup of the village was 88.06% White, 1.85% African American, 0.81% Native American, 0.46% Asian, 0.00% Pacific Islander, 2.09% from other races, and 6.72% from two or more races. Hispanic or Latino of any race were 5.79% of the population.

There were 380 households, out of which 22.6% had children under the age of 18 living with them, 30.53% were married couples living together, 12.89% had a female householder with no husband present, and 47.11% were non-families. 40.53% of all households were made up of individuals, and 22.63% had someone living alone who was 65 years of age or older. The average household size was 2.42 and the average family size was 1.88.

The village's age distribution consisted of 17.7% under the age of 18, 4.3% from 18 to 24, 19.8% from 25 to 44, 25.4% from 45 to 64, and 32.8% who were 65 years of age or older. The median age was 52.0 years. For every 100 females, there were 81.0 males. For every 100 females age 18 and over, there were 79.0 males.

The median income for a household in the village was $42,941, and the median income for a family was $60,625. Males had a median income of $30,000 versus $21,711 for females. The per capita income for the village was $24,451. About 11.4% of families and 20.1% of the population were below the poverty line, including 33.3% of those under age 18 and 5.1% of those age 65 or over.

== Education ==
River Ridge Community Unit School District 210 operates area public schools, including River Ridge High School.

== Notable people ==
- Carol C. Cleven, Massachusetts state representative
- Adlai Stevenson III, former U.S. Senator and former farmer in rural Hanover
- Charles W. Woodford, Illinois Treasurer; lived in Hanover
