= Hanover Township, Adams County, Nebraska =

Township in Nebraska, United States

Coordinates: 40°28′50″N 98°20′13″W

Hanover Township is one of sixteen townships in Adams County, Nebraska, United States. The population was 155 at the 2020 census.

== See also ==
- County government in Nebraska
