= Dutch Hollow Lake =

- Location within Wisconsin Location within the United States
- Country: United States
- Coordinates: 43°36′26″N 90°10′45″W
- Construction began: 1970

Reservoir
- Total capacity: 1.3×10^{9} US gal (4,900,000 m^{3})
- Catchment area: 3,072 acres (1,243 ha)
- Surface area: 210 acres (85 ha)
- Maximum water depth: 40 ft (12 m)
- Normal elevation: 950 ft (290 m)

Dutch Hollow Lake is a man-made reservoir located in the Town of La Valle, (Sauk County), Wisconsin, United States. Created by developers in the 1970s by impounding the water of Dutch Hollow Creek, it is now a public-access lake regulated by the Wisconsin Department of Natural Resources with two public-access ramps. The 40-foot (12 m) depth of the lake is maintained both by the flow from Dutch Hollow Creek and the pumping of groundwater.

== History ==
Construction of the dam began in the year 1970 by Branigar Lake Properties of Wisconsin. Fish varieties were initially stocked into Dutch Hollow Lake. Now the lake has a balance of Northern Pike, Walleye, Large Mouth Bass, Yellow Perch, Crappie, Bluegill, and other Sunfish.

== Geography ==
Dutch Hollow Lake (Lat. 43 degrees/Long. 90 degrees) has an elevation of 951 feet (290 m). It is northwest of the city of Reedsburg, with the city of Wisconsin Dells thirty minutes away. The lake is 210 acres (85 ha) and 40 feet (12 m) in depth.

== Environment ==
Dutch Hollow Lake is a drainage lake. This means that the lake has both an inlet and an outlet and the main source of water is drainage from the stream. The Lake can hold over 1.3 billion US gallons (4,900,000 m^{3}) of water when full. The shoreline goes for about eight and a half miles and is a bottom draw dam, which means water is taken from the bottom and transferred downstream. This allows cooler water for the downstream fish and cattle. Because of seepage into the ground, in addition to the run-off from a watershed of about 3,072 acres (1,243 ha), the lake is supplied by pumping from springs.
