= Scales Mound Community Unit School District 211 =

School district in Illinois, United States

Address
- 210 Main Street Scales Mound, Illinois, 61075; United States

District information
- Type: Public
- Grades: PreK–12
- NCES District ID: 1735610

Students and staff
- Students: 267

Other information
- Website: www.scalesmound.net

Scales Mound Community Unit School District 211 is a school district headquartered in Scales Mound, Illinois.

It serves Scales Mound and sections of Apple Canyon Lake and The Galena Territory, and the district covers about 70 square miles (180 km^{2}) in the northern part of Jo Daviess County.

Its schools include Scales Mound Elementary School, Scales Mound Junior High School, and Scales Mound High School.
