= River Ridge Community Unit School District 210 =

School district in Illinois, United States

Address
- 4141 Illinois Route 84 South Hanover, Illinois, 61041; United States

District information
- Type: Public
- Grades: PreK–12
- NCES District ID: 1700001

Students and staff
- Students: 464

Other information
- Website: riverridge210.org

River Ridge Community Unit School District 210 is a school district headquartered in Jo Daviess County, Illinois. In addition to the district serves Elizabeth and Hanover.

As of 2018 it has about 53 teachers and other certified employees, 40 non-certified employees, and 525 students.

== History ==
The district's current building opened in August 2003.

== Schools ==
It operates River Ridge Elementary School, River Ridge Middle School, and River Ridge High School.
