= Warren =

Warren most commonly refers to:

- Warren (burrow), a network dug by rabbits
- Warren (name), a given name and a surname, including lists of persons so named

Warren may also refer to:

== Places ==
=== Australia ===
- Warren (biogeographic region)
- Warren, New South Wales, a town
- Warren Shire, a local government area in NSW which includes the town
- Warren National Park, Western Australia

=== Barbados ===
- Warrens, Barbados

=== Canada ===
- Warren, Manitoba
- Warren, Ontario

=== United Kingdom ===
- Warren, Pembrokeshire
- Warren, Cheshire
- The Warren, Bracknell Forest, a suburb of Bracknell in Berkshire
- The Warren (Yeading), stadium in Hayes, Hillingdon, Greater London
- The Warren Hayes, Bromley, a former mansion now sports club used by the Metropolitan Police
- The Warren, Kent, part of the East Cliff and Warren Country Park
- The Warren, Woolwich, Britain's principal repository and manufactory of arms and ammunition, renamed the Royal Arsenal in 1805

=== United States ===
- Warren, Arizona
- Warren, Arkansas
- Warren, Connecticut
- Warren, Idaho
- Warren, Illinois
- Warren, Indiana
- Warren, Kentucky
- Warren, Maine
- Warren, Massachusetts
  - Warren (CDP), Massachusetts
- Warren, Michigan, a suburb of Detroit and the largest US city named Warren
- Warren, Minnesota
- Warren, Missouri
- Warren, Montana
- Warren, New Hampshire
- Warren Township, New Jersey
- Warren, New York
- Warren (hamlet), New York
- Warren, Ohio
- Warren, Oregon
- Warren, Pennsylvania
- Warren, Rhode Island
- Warren City, Texas
- Warren, Fannin County, Texas
- Warren, Tyler County, Texas
- Warren, Utah
- Warren, Vermont
  - Warren's Gore, Vermont
- Warren, Virginia
- Warren, St. Croix County, Wisconsin
- Warren, Waushara County, Wisconsin
- Warrens, Wisconsin
- Warren County (disambiguation)
- Warren Run, a stream in Ohio
- Warren Township (disambiguation)

== Arts, entertainment, and media ==
- Warren (Malazan Book of the Fallen), a kind of magic in the Malazan Book of the Fallen series of fantasy novels by Steven Erikson
- Warren (TV series), a British television sitcom

== Fictional characters ==
- Warren Enright, a character in sitcom Small Wonder (TV series)
- Warren Jensen, a character in the 1998 movie There's Something About Mary
- Warren (Porridge), a character named "Bunny" Warren played by Sam Kelly in the TV sitcom
- Miles Warren / Jackal, a Marvel Comics supervillain
- Gwen Warren / Spider-Girl, a Marvel Comics superhero and member of the X-Men

== Other uses ==
- Free warren, a medieval English hunting licence allowing the holder to kill certain species of game
- General Motors Technical Center located in Warren, Michigan, and therefore within the automotive industry often referred to only as "Warren"
- USS Warren, several ships of the Continental Navy and United States Navy
- Warren Abstract Machine, a Prolog (software) engine
