= Washington Township, Warren County, Indiana =

Washington Township
- Township
- Location of Washington Township in Warren County

- Location of Indiana in the United States
- Coordinates: 40°16′36″N 87°19′41″W
- Country: United States
- State: Indiana
- County: Warren

Government
  - Type: Indiana township

Area
  - Total: 19.51 sq mi (50.5 km^{2})
  - Land: 19.12 sq mi (49.5 km^{2})
  - Water: 0.38 sq mi (0.98 km^{2}) 1.95%
- Elevation: 669 ft (204 m)

Population (2020)
  - Total: 2,349
  - Density: 122.9/sq mi (47.43/km^{2})
- Time zone: UTC-5 (Eastern (EST))
  - Summer (DST): UTC-4 (EDT)
- Area code: 765
- GNIS feature ID: 454022

Washington Township is one of twelve townships in Warren County, Indiana, United States. It is the most populous township in the county; according to the 2020 census, its population was 2,349, with 1,950 of those living in Williamsport, and it contained 1,001 housing units. It has the highest population density of the Warren County townships at about 120 inhabitants per square mile (46/km^{2}).

Historical population
Census	Pop.	Note	%±
1890	1,482		—
1900	1,618		9.2%
1910	1,632		0.9%
1920	1,481		−9.3%
1930	1,443		−2.6%
1940	1,523		5.5%
1950	1,556		2.2%
1960	1,664		6.9%
1970	2,075		24.7%
1980	2,251		8.5%
1990	2,212		−1.7%
2000	2,351		6.3%
2010	2,298		−2.3%
2020	2,349		2.2%
Source: US Decennial Census

== History ==
The area that became Washington Township was first settled in 1827. Originally, the county was divided into four townships when it was formed in 1827; Washington Township was created a few years later in March 1830.

== Geography ==
According to the 2010 census, the township has a total area of 19.51 square miles (50.5 km^{2}), of which 19.12 square miles (49.5 km^{2}) (or 98.00%) is land and 0.38 square miles (0.98 km^{2}) (or 1.95%) is water. The Wabash River defines the township's southeastern border. Big Pine Creek flows through the far northeastern corner of the township on its way to the Wabash River. The streams of Clear Branch, Dry Branch, Fall Branch and Rock Creek also run through this township.

The county seat of Williamsport is in the east part of the township, near the river. Williamsport Falls, the highest waterfall in the State of Indiana, is in downtown Williamsport; the stream of Fall Creek flows through the town and falls 90 feet (27 m) over a sandstone ledge.

Map of Washington Township

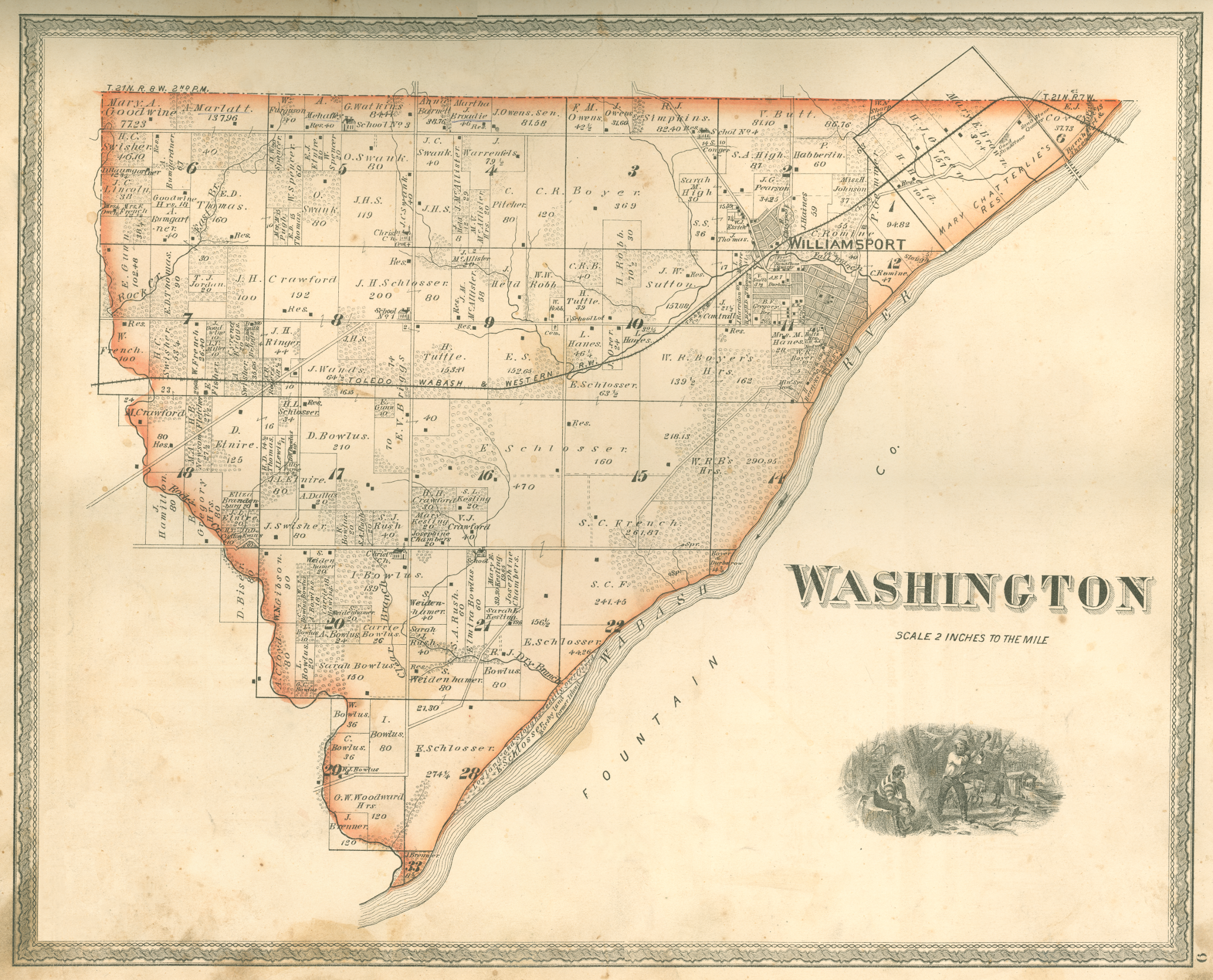
1877 map of Washington Township

=== Cemeteries ===
The township contains these four cemeteries: Highland, Hillside, Owens and Robb.

=== Transportation ===
Indiana State Road 28 passes through the township from east to west. Coming from the Illinois state line and West Lebanon, it goes directly east, then veers to the northeast and goes through Williamsport, then crosses the river and passes east through Attica in Fountain County. U.S. Route 41 and State Road 55 pass through the northeastern corner of the township and briefly share the route of State Road 28.

A Norfolk Southern Railway line passes through the township from east to west, leaving the township when it also crosses the river. For much of its route through the township, it parallels State Road 28, running just south of the highway.

== Education ==
Washington Township is part of the Metropolitan School District of Warren County. It contains one of the three elementary schools in the county, located in Williamsport.

Washington Township is served by the Williamsport-Washington Township Public Library.

== Government ==
Washington Township has a trustee who administers rural fire protection and ambulance service, provides relief to the poor, manages cemetery care, and performs farm assessment, among other duties. The trustee is assisted in these duties by a three-member township board. The trustees and board members are elected to four-year terms.

Washington Township is part of Indiana's 8th congressional district, Indiana House of Representatives District 42, and Indiana State Senate District 23.

== Climate and weather ==
Williamsport, Indiana

Climate chart (precipitation, max. and min. temperature)
J	F	M	A	M	J	J	A	S	O	N	D
1.7 30 13	1.6 35 17	3.2 47 27	3.6 60 38	4.2 72 49	4.5 81 59	3.7 84 62	3 82 59	2.6 77 51	3 64 39	3 48 30	2.5 35 19
- █ Average max. and min. temperatures in °F
- █ Precipitation totals in inches
- Source: The Weather Channel
Metric conversion
J	F	M	A	M	J	J	A	S	O	N	D
42 −1 −11	40 2 −8	80 8 −3	90 16 3	106 22 9	114 27 15	93 29 17	77 28 15	67 25 11	75 18 4	75 9 −1	64 2 −7
- █ Average max. and min. temperatures in °C
- █ Precipitation totals in mm

In recent years, average temperatures in Williamsport have ranged from a low of 13 °F (−11 °C) in January to a high of 84 °F (29 °C) in July, with a record low of −24 °F (−31 °C) recorded in January 1999 and a record high of 99 °F (37 °C) in July 1995. Average monthly precipitation ranges from 1.59 inches (40 mm) in February to 4.50 inches (114 mm) in June.
