= Warren Township, Illinois =

Warren Township, Illinois may refer to one of the following townships:

- Warren Township, Jo Daviess County, Illinois
- Warren Township, Lake County, Illinois

See also

- Warren Township (disambiguation)
