= Pike Township, Warren County, Indiana =

Pike Township
- Township
- Location of Pike Township in Warren County

- Location of Indiana in the United States
- Coordinates: 40°15′21″N 87°23′20″W
- Country: United States
- State: Indiana
- County: Warren

Government
  - Type: Indiana township

Area
  - Total: 17.56 sq mi (45.5 km^{2})
  - Land: 17.36 sq mi (45.0 km^{2})
  - Water: 0.2 sq mi (0.52 km^{2}) 1.14%
- Elevation: 659 ft (201 m)

Population (2020)
  - Total: 1,167
  - Density: 67.22/sq mi (25.96/km^{2})
- Time zone: UTC-5 (Eastern (EST))
  - Summer (DST): UTC-4 (EDT)
- Area code: 765
- GNIS feature ID: 453737

Pike Township is one of twelve townships in Warren County, Indiana, United States. According to the 2020 census, its population was 1,167 and it contained 515 housing units.

Historical population
Census	Pop.	Note	%±
1890	1,043		—
1900	1,107		6.1%
1910	1,039		−6.1%
1920	997		−4.0%
1930	929		−6.8%
1940	898		−3.3%
1950	931		3.7%
1960	1,047		12.5%
1970	1,266		20.9%
1980	1,480		16.9%
1990	1,234		−16.6%
2000	1,185		−4.0%
2010	1,221		3.0%
2020	1,167		−4.4%
Source: US Decennial Census

== History ==
Pike Township was one of the four original townships in the county, formed on November 6, 1827.

== Geography ==
According to the 2010 census, the township has a total area of 17.56 square miles (45.5 km^{2}), of which 17.36 square miles (45.0 km^{2}) (or 98.86%) is land and 0.2 square miles (0.52 km^{2}) (or 1.14%) is water. The streams of Dry Branch, Foster Branch, Johnson Branch, Jordan Creek and Redwood Creek run through this township. Pike Township has two towns: West Lebanon, with a population of 793 and contains two-thirds of the residents of the township, and Old Town.

Map of Pike Township

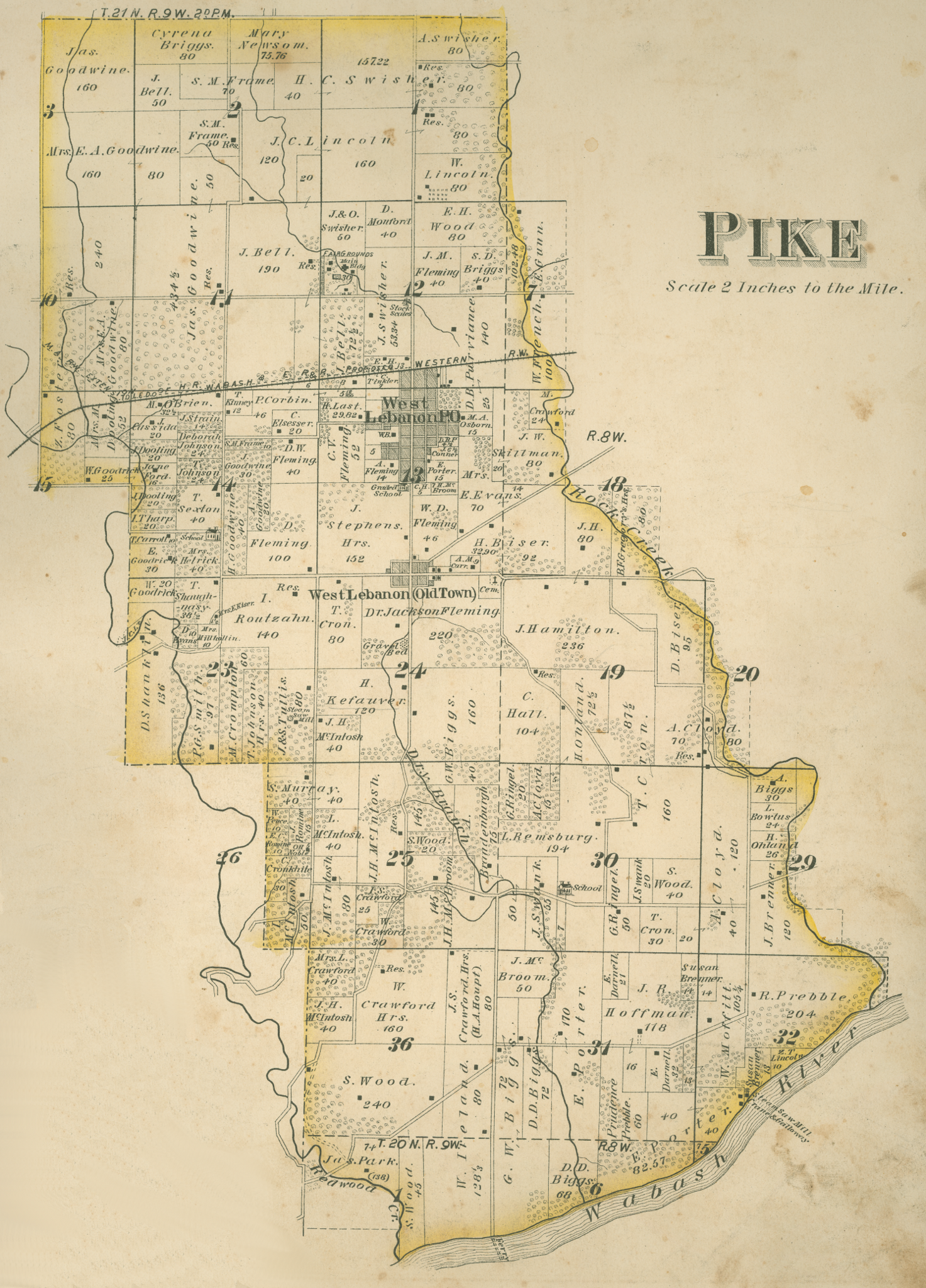
1877 map of Pike Township

=== Cemeteries ===
The township contains two cemeteries. Shanklin Hill Cemetery is a small burial ground located on the western border of the township. West Lebanon Cemetery is much larger and is located southeast of the town.

=== Transportation ===
Indiana State Road 28 passes through the north end of the township on its route from the Illinois state line in the west to Williamsport (and beyond) in the east. Indiana State Road 63 begins in Liberty Township just to the north, and runs through the western part of Pike Township on its way south to Terre Haute. Indiana State Road 263 begins at State Road 63 and passes through West Lebanon, re-joining State Road 63 in the south part of the county.

== Education ==
Pike Township is part of the Metropolitan School District of Warren County. It contains the county's only high school, Seeger Memorial Junior-Senior High School, located on State Road 263 north of West Lebanon; one of the three elementary schools, Warren Central Elementary School, is co-located with Seeger.

Pike Township is served by the West Lebanon-Pike Township Public Library.

== Government ==
Pike Township has a trustee who administers rural fire protection and ambulance service, provides relief to the poor, manages cemetery care, and performs farm assessment, among other duties. The trustee is assisted in these duties by a three-member township board. The trustees and board members are elected to four-year terms.

Pike Township is part of Indiana's 8th congressional district, Indiana House of Representatives District 42, and Indiana State Senate District 38.

== Climate and weather ==
West Lebanon, Indiana

Climate chart (precipitation, max. and min. temperature)
J	F	M	A	M	J	J	A	S	O	N	D
1.9 32 15	1.8 38 20	2.8 49 29	3.4 62 39	4.3 73 50	4.5 82 60	4.2 85 63	3.7 83 60	3.1 77 52	2.8 65 41	3.2 50 33	2.5 37 21
- █ Average max. and min. temperatures in °F
- █ Precipitation totals in inches
- Source: The Weather Channel
Metric conversion
J	F	M	A	M	J	J	A	S	O	N	D
49 0 −9	46 3 −7	72 9 −2	86 17 4	108 23 10	115 28 16	106 29 17	93 28 16	77 25 11	71 18 5	81 10 1	65 3 −6
- █ Average max. and min. temperatures in °C
- █ Precipitation totals in mm

In recent years, average temperatures in West Lebanon have ranged from a low of 15 °F (−9 °C) in January to a high of 85 °F (29 °C) in July, with a record low of −26 °F (−32 °C) recorded in January 1994 and a record high of 105 °F (41 °C) recorded in August 1988. Average monthly precipitation ranged from 1.80 inches (46 mm) in February to 4.53 inches (115 mm) in June.
