= Warren Township, Indiana =

Warren Township, Indiana may refer to one of the following places:

- Warren Township, Clinton County, Indiana
- Warren Township, Huntington County, Indiana
- Warren Township, Marion County, Indiana
- Warren Township, Putnam County, Indiana
- Warren Township, St. Joseph County, Indiana
- Warren Township, Warren County, Indiana

See also

- Warren Township (disambiguation)
