= Joseph Warren =

American physician and Founding Father (1741–1775)

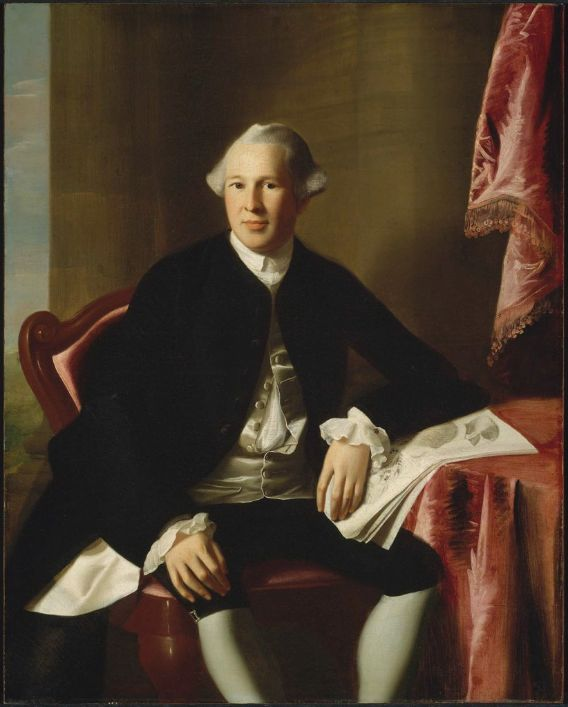
- Portrait by John Singleton Copley, c. 1765

2nd President of the Massachusetts Provincial Congress
- In office May 2, 1775 – June 17, 1775
- Preceded by: John Hancock
- Succeeded by: James Warren

Personal details
- Born: June 10, 1741[O.S. May 30, 1741] Roxbury, Province of Massachusetts Bay, British America
- Died: June 17, 1775 (aged 34) Breed's Hill, Charlestown, Province of Massachusetts Bay, British America
- Cause of death: Killed in action
- Resting place: Forest Hills Cemetery
- Spouse: Elizabeth Hooten (m. 1764; died 1773)
- Relations: Mercy Scollay (unproven fiancée)
- Children: Elizabeth, Joseph, Mary, and Richard
- Education: Roxbury Latin School
- Alma mater: Harvard College (AB, AM)
- Occupation: Physician

Military service
- Allegiance: Massachusetts; United Colonies
- Branch/service: Massachusetts Militia
- Years of service: 1775
- Rank: Major general
- Battles/wars: American Revolutionary War; Massachusetts campaign; Battles of Lexington and Concord; Siege of Boston; Battle of Bunker Hill †

Joseph Warren (June 10, 1741[O.S. May 30, 1741] – June 17, 1775), was an American Founding Father and physician who was one of the most important figures in the Patriot movement in Boston during the early days of the American Revolution, eventually serving as President of the revolutionary Massachusetts Provincial Congress. Warren drafted the 1774 Suffolk Resolves, was active in the Sons of Liberty, and enlisted Paul Revere and William Dawes on April 18, 1775, to leave Boston and spread the alarm that the British garrison in Boston was setting out to raid the town of Concord and arrest rebel leaders John Hancock and Samuel Adams.

Warren had been commissioned a major general in the Massachusetts Militia shortly before the June 17, 1775 Battle of Bunker Hill. Rather than exercise his rank, Warren chose to participate in the battle as a private soldier, and was killed in combat when British troops stormed the redoubt atop Breed's Hill. His death, immortalized in John Trumbull's painting, The Death of General Warren at the Battle of Bunker's Hill, June 17, 1775, galvanized the rebel forces. Warren has been memorialized in the naming of many towns, counties, streets, and other locations in the United States, by statues, and in numerous other ways.

== Early life and education ==
Warren was born in Roxbury, Province of Massachusetts Bay, to Joseph and Mary (née Stevens) Warren. His father was a respected farmer who died in October 1755 when he fell off a ladder while gathering fruit in his orchard.

After attending the Roxbury Latin School, Joseph enrolled in Harvard College, graduating in 1759, and then taught for about a year at Roxbury Latin. While teaching at Roxbury, Warren pursued postgraduate studies at Harvard, graduating with a Master of Arts degree in 1763, after defending a thesis against the proposition that all disease was caused by obstruction of bodily vessels.

== Freemasonry ==
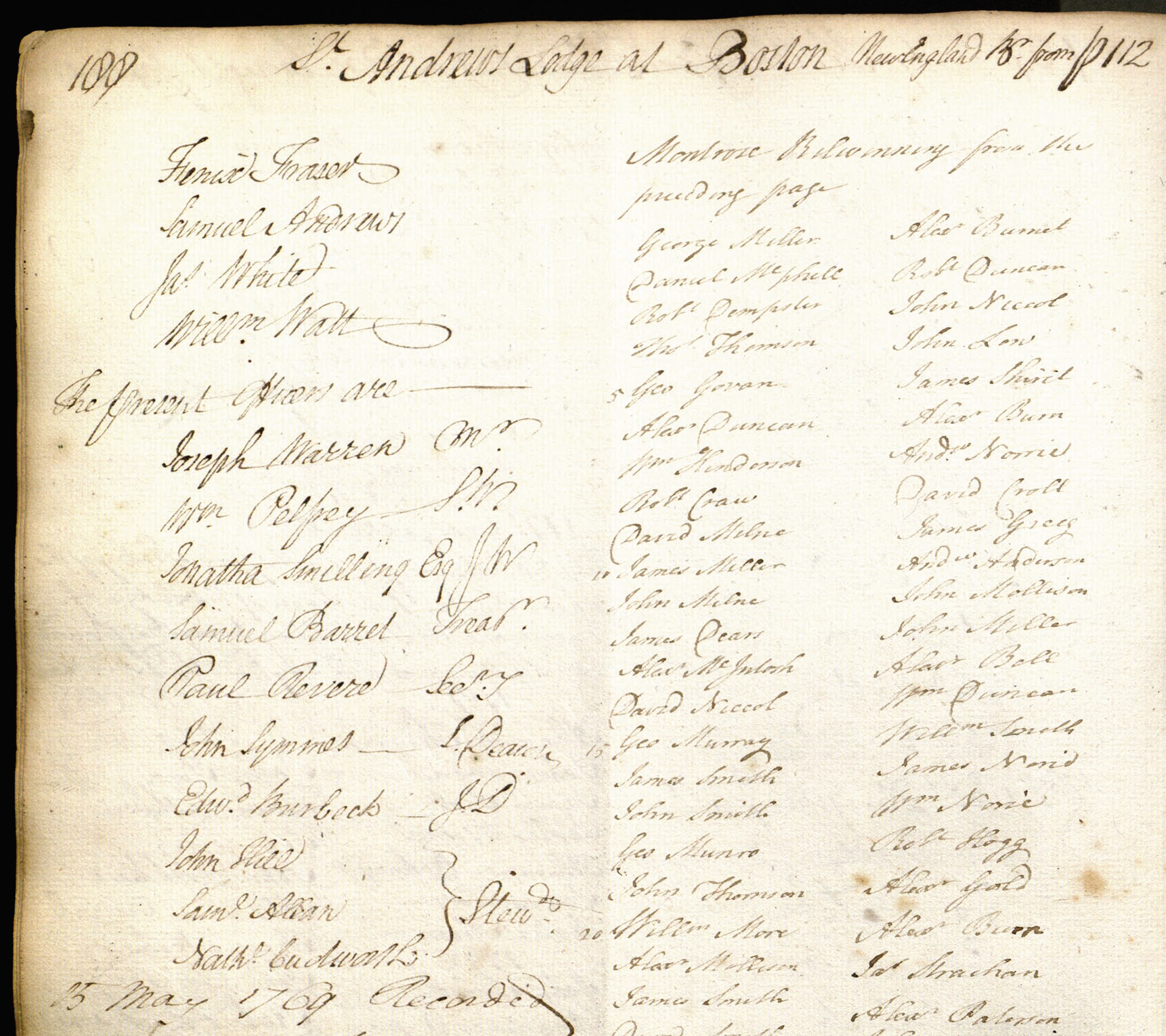
Extract from membership register for Revere, Warren and Palfrey from St. Andrew's Masonic Lodge in Boston.

Warren joined the Freemasons, being initiated in the St. Andrew's Lodge, No. 81 in Boston, Massachusetts, which held a Charter from the Grand Lodge of Scotland. The Lodge continues to meet in Boston under the Grand Lodge of Massachusetts.

The date he joined the Lodge is not known but was during the period after the inauguration of the Lodge on St. Andrew's Day, November 30, 1756 and May 15, 1769 when he is recorded in the Grand Lodge of Scotland's membership register as being the Master of the Lodge. Paul Revere and William Palfrey are also recorded, in the same entry, with Revere being named as Secretary of the Lodge. Warren was appointed Grand Master of all Scottish Freemasonry in the Thirteen Colonies by the Grand Lodge of Scotland.

He was appointed Grand Master of the newly established Provincial Grand Lodge of Massachusetts in that same year. Upon his death, Joseph Webb became Acting Grand Master.

== Career ==
While practicing medicine and surgery in Boston, he became involved in politics, associating with John Hancock, Samuel Adams, and other leaders of the broad movement labeled Sons of Liberty. He was one of the leaders of patriot activities during the 1768 Liberty Affair and facilitated an agreement with Hancock and government customs officials prior to the Boston demonstrations. That same year, Royal officials tried to place his publishers Edes and Gill on trial for an incendiary newspaper essay Warren wrote under the pseudonym A True Patriot, but no local jury would indict them.

Warren conducted an autopsy on the body of young Christopher Seider in February 1770, and was a member of the Boston committee that assembled a report on the following month's Boston Massacre.

While many historians contend that Warren had no role in the 1773 Boston Tea Party, some have recently argued that he was a key planner of the event.

In 1774, he authored the song "Free America," which was published in colonial newspapers. The poem was set to a traditional British tune, "The British Grenadiers."

Warren owned at least one enslaved person. This man, whose name is unknown and who was formerly held by Joshua Green, helped Warren with his medical practice.

=== American Revolution ===
==== Battles of Lexington and Concord ====
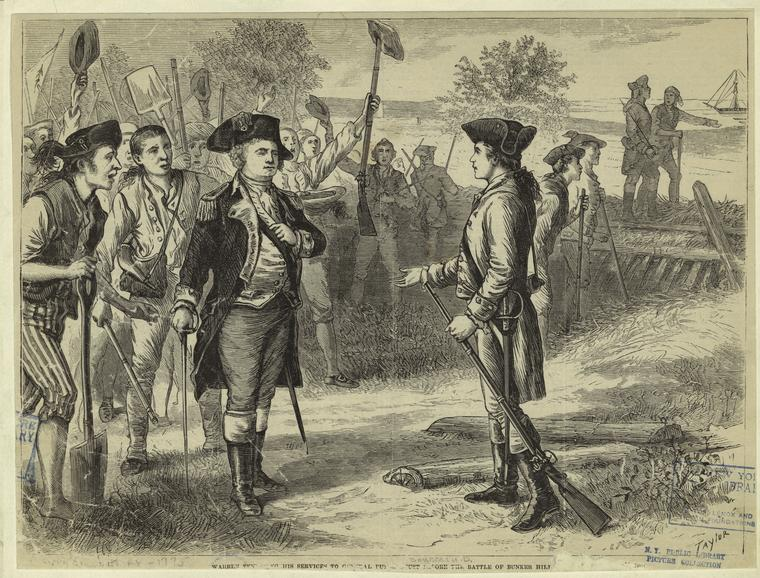
Warren (right) offering to serve General Israel Putnam as a private before the Battle of Bunker Hill

As Boston's conflict with the royal government came to a head in 1773–1775, Warren was appointed to the Boston Committee of Correspondence. He twice delivered orations in commemoration of the Massacre, the second time in March 1775 while the town was occupied by army troops. Warren drafted the Suffolk Resolves, which were endorsed by the Continental Congress, to advocate resistance to Parliament's Coercive Acts, which were otherwise known as the Intolerable Acts. He was appointed President of the Massachusetts Provincial Congress, the highest position in the revolutionary government.

In mid-April 1775, Warren and Benjamin Church were the two top members of the Committee of Correspondence left in Boston. On the afternoon of April 18, the British troops in the town mobilized for a long-planned raid on the nearby town of Concord, and already before nightfall word of mouth had spread knowledge of the mobilization widely within Boston. It had been known to rebel leadership for weeks that General Gage in Boston had plans to destroy munitions stored in Concord by the colonials, and it was also known that they would be taking a route through Lexington.

Unsupported stories argue that Warren received additional information from a highly placed informant, usually claiming it was from Margaret Kemble Gage, the wife of General Thomas Gage, that the troops had orders to arrest Samuel Adams and John Hancock. However, there is little evidence of this as the troops apparently had no such orders. There is growing consensus in new scholarship that Mrs. Gage did not conspire against the British and that Warren needed no informant to deduce that the British were mobilizing.

Warren learned there was some British expedition likely to begin that night, and so sent William Dawes and Paul Revere on their famous "midnight rides" to warn Hancock and Adams in Lexington.

Warren slipped out of Boston early on April 19, and during that day's Battle of Lexington and Concord, he coordinated and led the Massachusetts Militia into the fight alongside William Heath as the British Army returned to Boston. When the enemy were returning from Concord, he was among the foremost in hanging upon their rear and assailing their flanks. During this fighting Warren was nearly killed, a musket ball striking part of his wig. When his mother saw him after the battle and heard of his escape, she entreated him with tears again not to risk life so precious. "Wherever danger is, dear mother," he answered, "there will your son be. Now is no time for one of America's children to shrink from the most hazardous duty; I will either set my country free, or shed my last drop of blood to make her so." He then turned to recruiting and organizing soldiers for the Siege of Boston, promulgating the Patriots' version of events, and negotiating with General Gage in his role as head of the Provincial Congress.

==== Battle of Bunker Hill ====
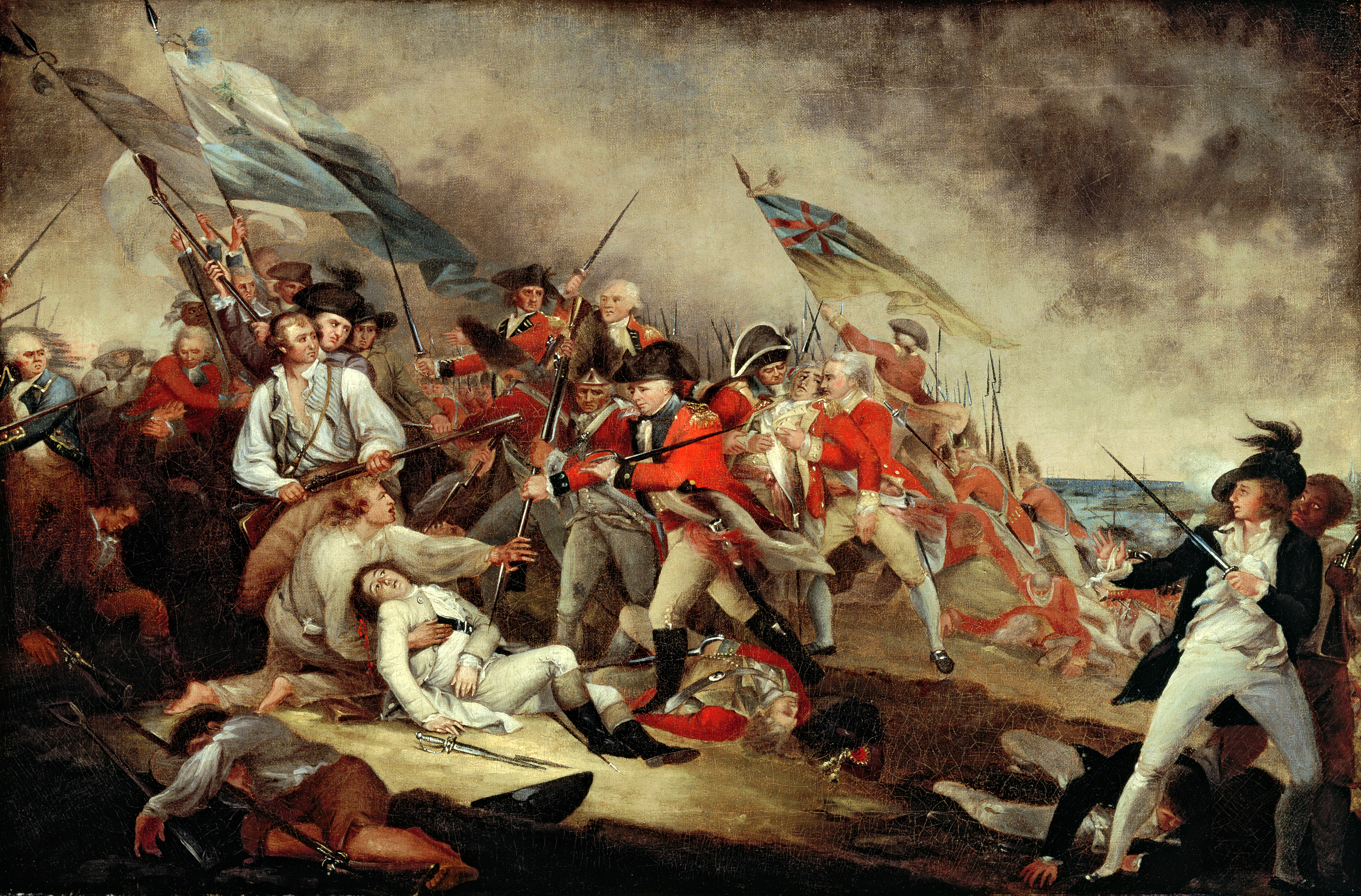
The Death of General Warren at the Battle of Bunker's Hill, June 17, 1775. Warren is shown lying at center-left.

Warren was commissioned into the Continental Army at the rank of major general by the Massachusetts Provincial Congress on June 14, 1775. Three days later, he arrived at Charlestown just before the Battle of Bunker Hill began and made his way to where Patriot militiamen were forming. Upon meeting General Israel Putnam, Warren asked where he thought the heaviest fighting would be; Putnam responded by pointing to Breed's Hill. Warren subsequently volunteered to join the militia at the rank of private against the wishes of both Putnam and Colonel William Prescott, both of whom unsuccessfully requested that he serve as their commander instead. Warren declined their request due to the fact that Putnam and Prescott had military experience.

During the early stages of the battle, Warren repeatedly stated that "These fellows say we won't fight! By Heaven, I hope I shall die up to my knees in blood!" Defending the Patriot redoubt against two failed attacks by British troops, he kept firing his gun until running out of ammunition. During the third and final assault, Warren was shot in the head below his left eye 60 yards from the redoubt and died instantly; the man who killed him was possibly a British officer's servant, an assertion supported by a forensic analysis conducted in 2011.

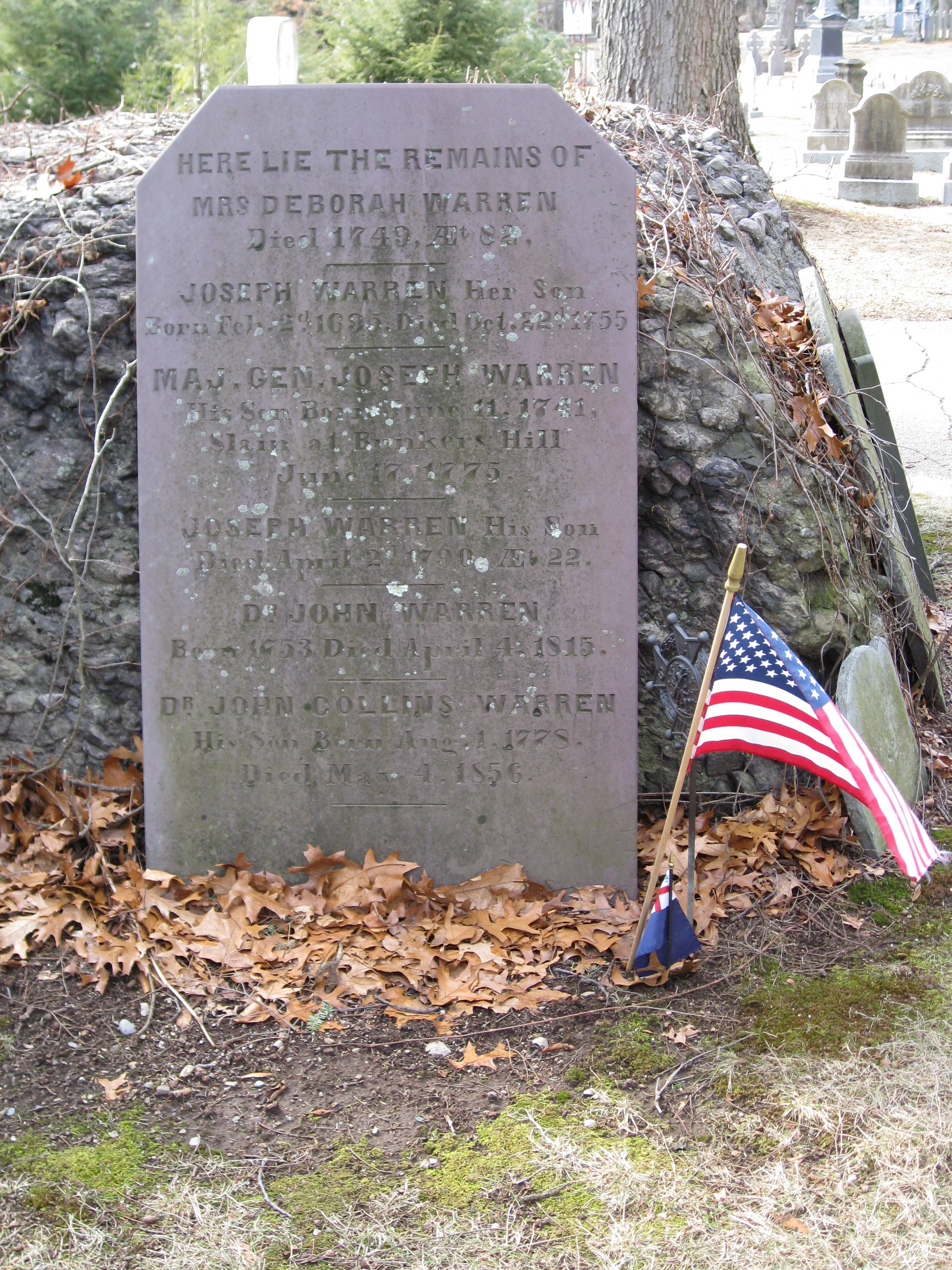
Warren's grave in Forest Hills Cemetery

Following the battle, Warren's body was discovered by a burial party of the 43rd Regiment of Foot, which buried him in a shallow ditch. Captain Walter Laurie, who oversaw the burial party, wrote that he "found [Warren] among the slain, and stuffed the scoundrel with another rebel, into one hole, and there he, and his seditious principles may remain." Benjamin Hichborn, a Boston lawyer who had joined the Continental Army, wrote a letter to John Adams on December 10, 1775 noting he heard he heard a rumor from "two gentlemen" who claimed that Lieutenant James Drew, the commander of the sloop-of-war HMS Scorpion, went to Breed's Hill "a day or two" after the battle and exhumed Warren's corpse, "spit in his face, jumped on his stomach, and at last cut off his head and committed every act of violence upon his body... In justice to the officers in general I must add, that they despised Drew for his Conduct."

Warren's body was exhumed 10 months after his death by his brothers and Paul Revere, who identified the remains by an artificial tooth Warren had installed in his jaw. He was given a Masonic funeral and his body was interred in the Granary Burying Ground. In 1825, it was exhumed and reinterred in St. Paul's Church in Boston before being moved one final time in 1855 to his family's vault in Boston's Forest Hills Cemetery.

== Personal life ==
Warren married 18-year-old heiress Elizabeth Hooten on September 6, 1764. She died in 1773, leaving him with four children: Elizabeth, Joseph, Mary, and Richard. Before his death in 1775, some sources say he was engaged to Mercy Scollay, although others suggest that she was only the children's nanny.

At the time of Warren's death, his children were staying with Mercy Scollay in Worcester as refugees from the Siege of Boston. She continued to look after them, gathering support for their education from Benedict Arnold, and later the Continental Congress. John Hancock, Samuel Adams, and Mercy Otis Warren also provided support.

Joseph's youngest brother and apprentice in medicine, John Warren, served as a surgeon during the Battle of Bunker Hill and the rest of the war, and afterwards founded Harvard Medical School and co-founded the Massachusetts Medical Society.

== Legacy ==
British General Gage is rumored to have said that Warren's death was equal to the death of 500 ordinary colonials. It was viewed by many Americans as an act of martyrdom.

=== Places ===
Fourteen states have a Warren County named after him. Additionally, Warren, Pennsylvania; Warren, Michigan; Warren, New Jersey; Warrenton, Missouri; Warrenton, Virginia; Warren, Maine; Warren, Massachusetts; Warrenton, North Carolina; Warren, Connecticut; Warrenton, Georgia and 30 Warren Townships as well as Warrensville, Eldred Township, Lycoming County, Pennsylvania are also named in his honor.

Warren County in New York is named after him, but the town of Warrensburg within that county is not; the town is in fact named after James Warren, a prominent early settler.

Fort Warren on George's Island in Boston harbor, started in 1833, was named in his honor.

Warren Township is a township in Marion County in Indiana. It was named in honor of Joseph Warren in 1822.

Warren Square in Savannah, Georgia, is also named for him, as well as Warren Street in Trenton, New Jersey.

Warren Avenue in Detroit is named after Joseph Warren.

=== Schools ===
In 1840, the first Warren School was built on Salem Street in Charlestown, Massachusetts near Bunker Hill. It relocated to School and Summer Streets in 1868, and later merged with the Prescott School to form the Warren-Prescott School.

Warren Central High School, the sole high school of Warren Township on the far eastside of Indianapolis, Indiana, is named after Joseph Warren. Warren Township is a township in Marion County in Indiana.

=== Freemasonry ===
In 1807, Warren Lodge No. 32, a Masonic lodge of the Grand Lodge of New York that now meets in Schultzville, New York was founded and was named in memory of Joseph Warren.

In 1930, the Grand Lodge of Massachusetts created the Joseph Warren Distinguished Service Medal for Masons who served the fraternity, the country, or humanity with distinction.

=== Other ===
Five ships in the Continental Navy and United States Navy were named Warren in his honor.

In 2022, the Dr. Joseph Warren Robotics and Research Center located at the Phillipsburg Campus of Warren County Community College.

=== In popular culture ===
Joseph Warren is referenced in the 1859 A. W. Burns and George W. Hewitt song "America Shall Aye Be Free".

Walter Coy portrayed Warren in the 1957 film Johnny Tremain. Warren also appeared in episodes 5 and 9 of the 2002 animated television show Liberty's Kids.

Ryan Eggold was cast as Warren in the 2015 miniseries Sons of Liberty.

Warren is featured in the song "Wildfire" by the band Mandolin Orange (renamed Watchhouse) on their 2016 album Blindfaller.

In 2020, Jeffrey J. McKenna wrote Saving Dr. Warren . . . "A True Patriot", a book about a 21st-century teenage boy who travels back in time and meets Warren and other Founding Fathers.

=== Statues ===
There are at least five statues of Joseph Warren on public display. Three are in Boston. The first statue of Joseph Warren was completed by Henry Dexter in 1857 and is located adjacent to the Bunker Hill Monument. A second, completed in 1904, is located on the grounds of the Roxbury Latin School, and the third atop the puddingstone at his grave site at the Forest Hills Cemetery. This statue was commissioned by the 6th Masonic District, and dedicated in a ceremony by the Grand Master of Masons in Massachusetts on October 22, 2016. The fourth is in a small park on the corner of Third and Pennsylvania avenues in Warren, Pennsylvania, a city, borough, and county all named after the general. The fifth, and newest, is in Lebanon, Ohio, located in Warren County and was unveiled on June 17, 2025, the 250th anniversary of Warren's death.

=== Image gallery ===
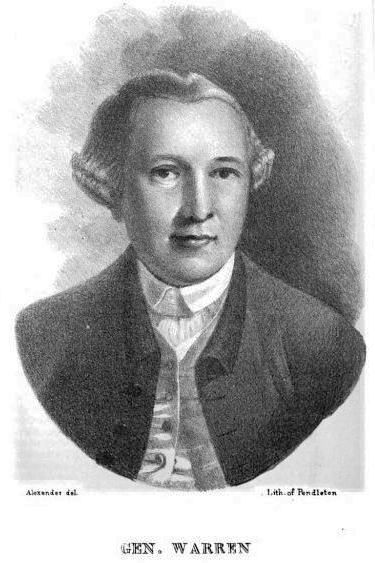
An 1826 portrait of Warren published in Boston Monthly Magazine

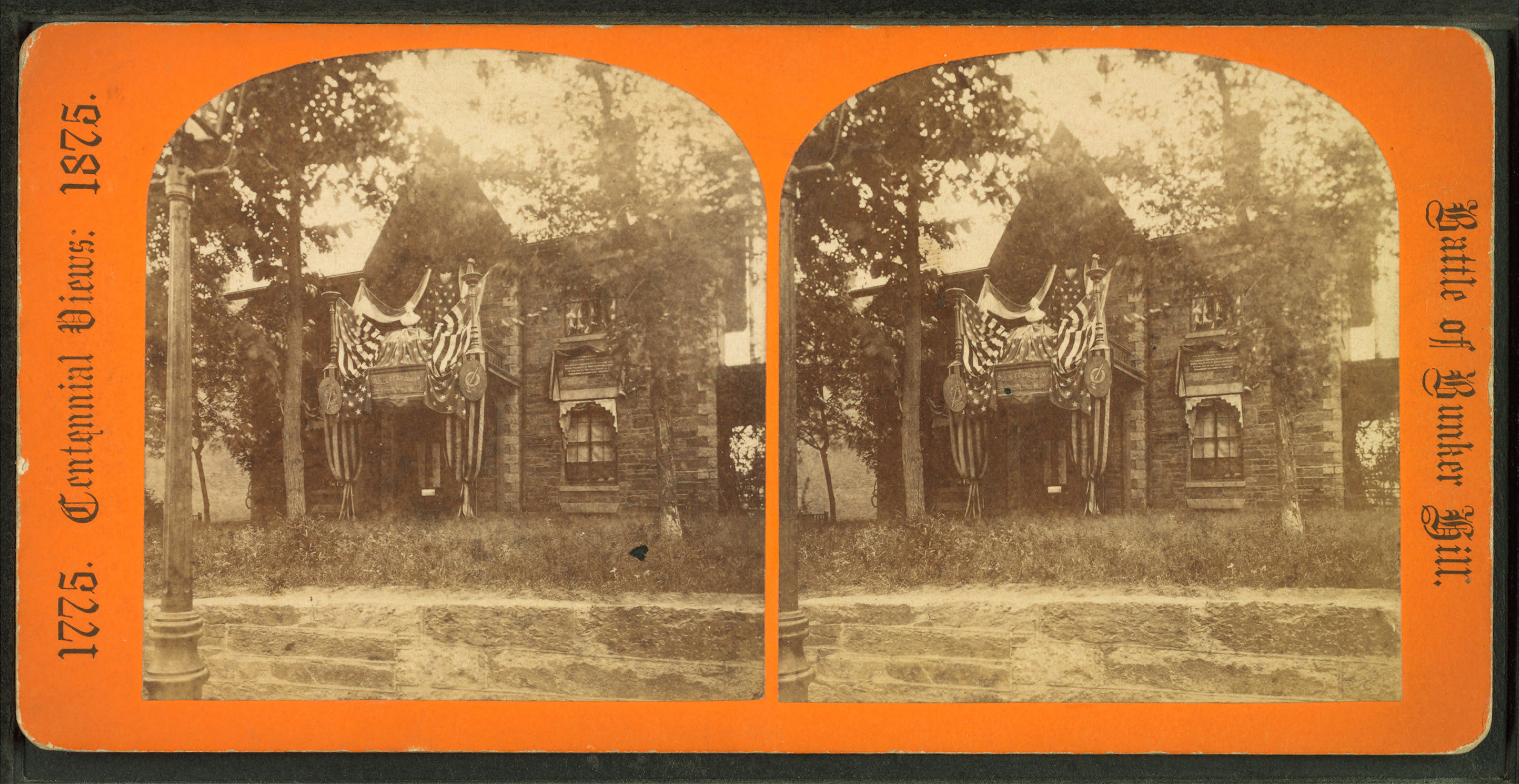
Gothic Revival building built in 1846 by Warren's nephew John Collins Warren to serve as a memorial to his Roxbury, Massachusetts birthplace home.

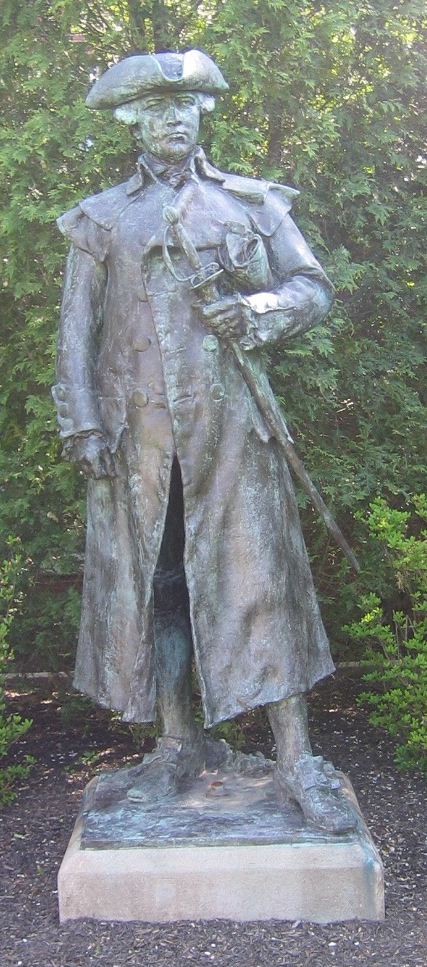
Warren's statue by Paul Wayland Bartlett (1904) in front of the Roxbury Latin School

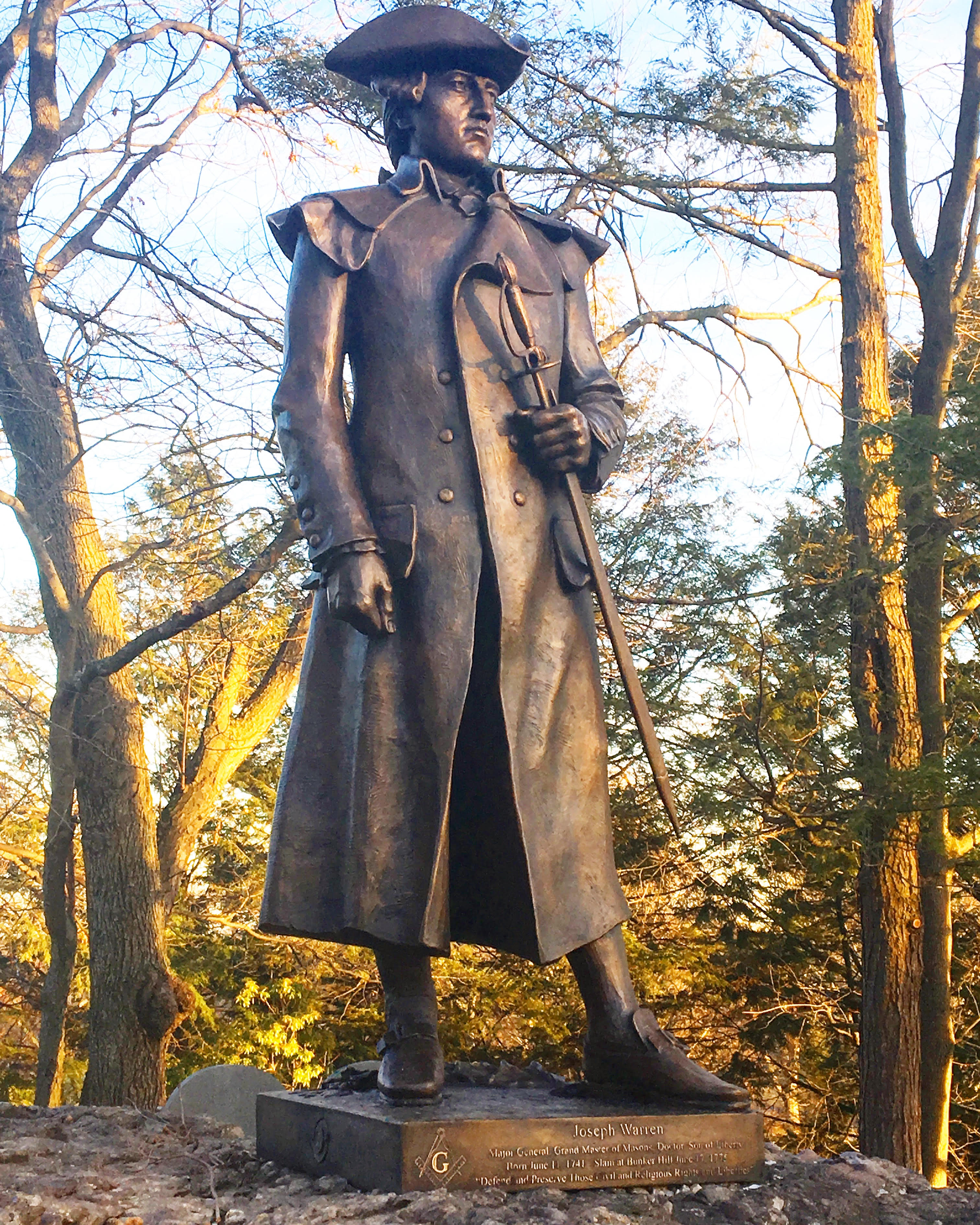
Joseph Warren Statue (2016) located at Forest Hills Cemetery in Boston

== See also ==
- List of Freemasons

== Bibliography ==
- Cary, John (1961). Joseph Warren: Physician, Politician, Patriot. University of Illinois Press. Crown Publishing.
- Di Spigna, Christian (2018). Founding Martyr: The Life and Death of Dr. Joseph Warren, the American Revolution's Lost Hero. Crown. ISBN 9780553419320.
- Fischer, David Hackett (1994). Paul Revere's Ride. Oxford University Press. ISBN 9780195088472.
- Forman, Samuel A. (2012). Dr. Joseph Warren: The Boston Tea Party, Bunker Hill, and the Birth of American Liberty. Pelican Publishing. ISBN 978-1-4556-1474-5.
- Frothingham, Richard (1865). Life and Times of Joseph Warren. Boston: Little, Brown, & Company. Life and Times of Joseph Warren public domain audiobook at LibriVox
- Hardman, Ron; Hardman, Jessica (2010). Shadow Fox: Sons of Liberty. Fox Run Press. ISBN 978-0-9819607-0-8.
- Warren, Joseph, ed. (1928–1936). Dictionary of American Biography Base Set. American Council of Learned Societies. Farmington Hills, MI: Gale Group.
- Tourtellot, Arthur Bernon (1959). Lexington and Concord: The Beginning of the War of the American Revolution. Doubleday. ISBN 978-0-393-32056-5.
- Wilson, James Grant; Fiske, John, eds. (1887–1889). Appleton's Cyclopedia of American Biography. New York: D. Appleton and Company. Bibcode:1887acab.book.....W.
