= Old Town, Indiana =

- Ghost town
- Location in Warren County
- Coordinates: 40°15′29″N 87°23′12″W
- Country: United States
- State: Indiana
- County: Warren
- Township: Pike
- Elevation: 686 ft (209 m)
- Time zone: UTC-5 (Eastern (EST))
  - Summer (DST): UTC-4 (EDT)
- ZIP code: 47991
- Area code: 765
- GNIS feature ID: 440606

Old Town is an extinct town located in Pike Township in Warren County, Indiana, and the original site of what is now the town of West Lebanon.

It was platted in the fall of 1830 by Ebenezer Purviance, John G. Jemison and Andrew Fleming, and was originally named Lebanon. When the Wabash Railroad was built through the area in 1856, it passed about a mile north of the community, and so most of the town shifted to be nearer the station. When the town incorporated in 1869 (under the name West Lebanon) it was at the new location by the railroad, and the original site came to be known as Old Town.

A number of buildings are still in and around Old Town, and it is still cited by the USGS.

== Geography ==
Old Town is located at 40°15′29″N 87°23′12″W, near the intersection of what is now Old Highway 63 and County Road 400 South.
