= Black Rock, Indiana =

- Ghost town
- Location in Warren County
- Coordinates: 40°22′04″N 87°05′49″W
- Country: United States
- State: Indiana
- County: Warren
- Township: Warren
- Elevation: 525 ft (160 m)
- Time zone: UTC-5 (Eastern (EST))
  - Summer (DST): UTC-4 (EDT)
- ZIP code: 47970
- Area code: 765
- GNIS feature ID: 431141

Black Rock is an extinct community located in Warren Township in Warren County, Indiana, near the border with Tippecanoe County. The site, which is still listed as a populated place by the USGS, is mostly forested and is part of the Black Rock Nature Preserve administered by NICHES Land Trust.

== Geography ==
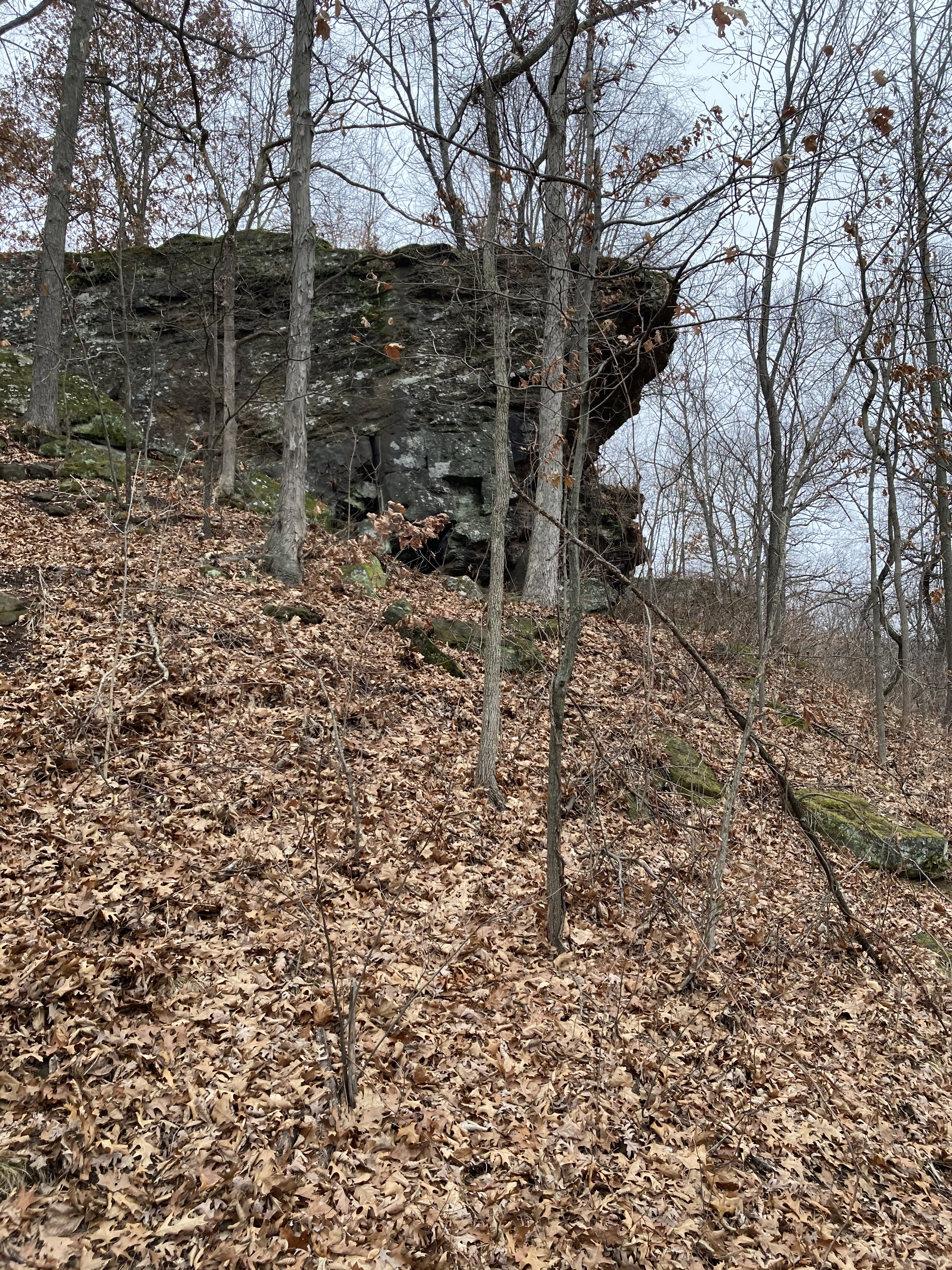
Black Rock Nature Preserve

Black Rock is located along Warren County Road 350 North. The site occupies a prominent outcropping of Mansfield sandstone that overlooks the Wabash River.
