= P. K. Spencer =

American politician

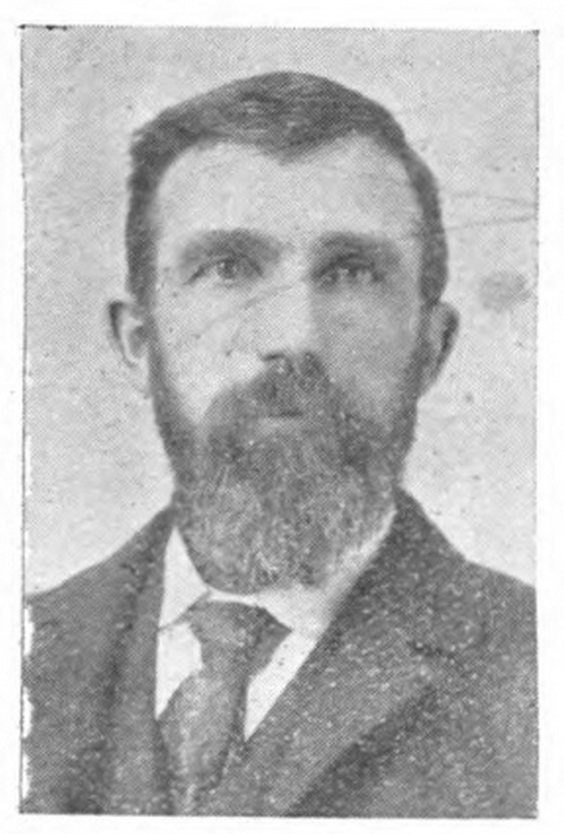
- Spencer in 1895

Member of the Washington House of Representatives for the 15th district
- In office 1889; 1895–1897

Personal details
- Born: July 14, 1848 Williamsport, Indiana, United States
- Died: October 21, 1910 (aged 62) Oklahoma, United States
- Party: Populist

Perrin Kent Spencer (July 14, 1848 – October 21, 1910) was an American politician in the state of Washington. He served in the Washington House of Representatives from 1895 to 1897 and in 1889.
