= Glen Cliff, Indiana =

- Ghost town
- Location in Warren County
- Coordinates: 40°18′59″N 87°14′56″W
- Country: United States
- State: Indiana
- County: Warren
- Township: Warren
- Elevation: 574 ft (175 m)
- Time zone: UTC-5 (Eastern (EST))
  - Summer (DST): UTC-4 (EDT)
- ZIP code: 47918
- Area code: 765
- GNIS feature ID: 435101

Glen Cliff is an extinct town that was located in Warren Township in Warren County, Indiana, north of the city of Attica in Fountain County.

A few buildings in the community exist, and it is still cited by the USGS.

== Geography ==
Glen Cliff was located near the intersection of Independence Road and Milligan Hill Road, about a ½-mile from the Wabash River and 1½ miles north of Attica.
