= Williamsport-Washington Township Public Library =

Public library in Williamsport, Indiana

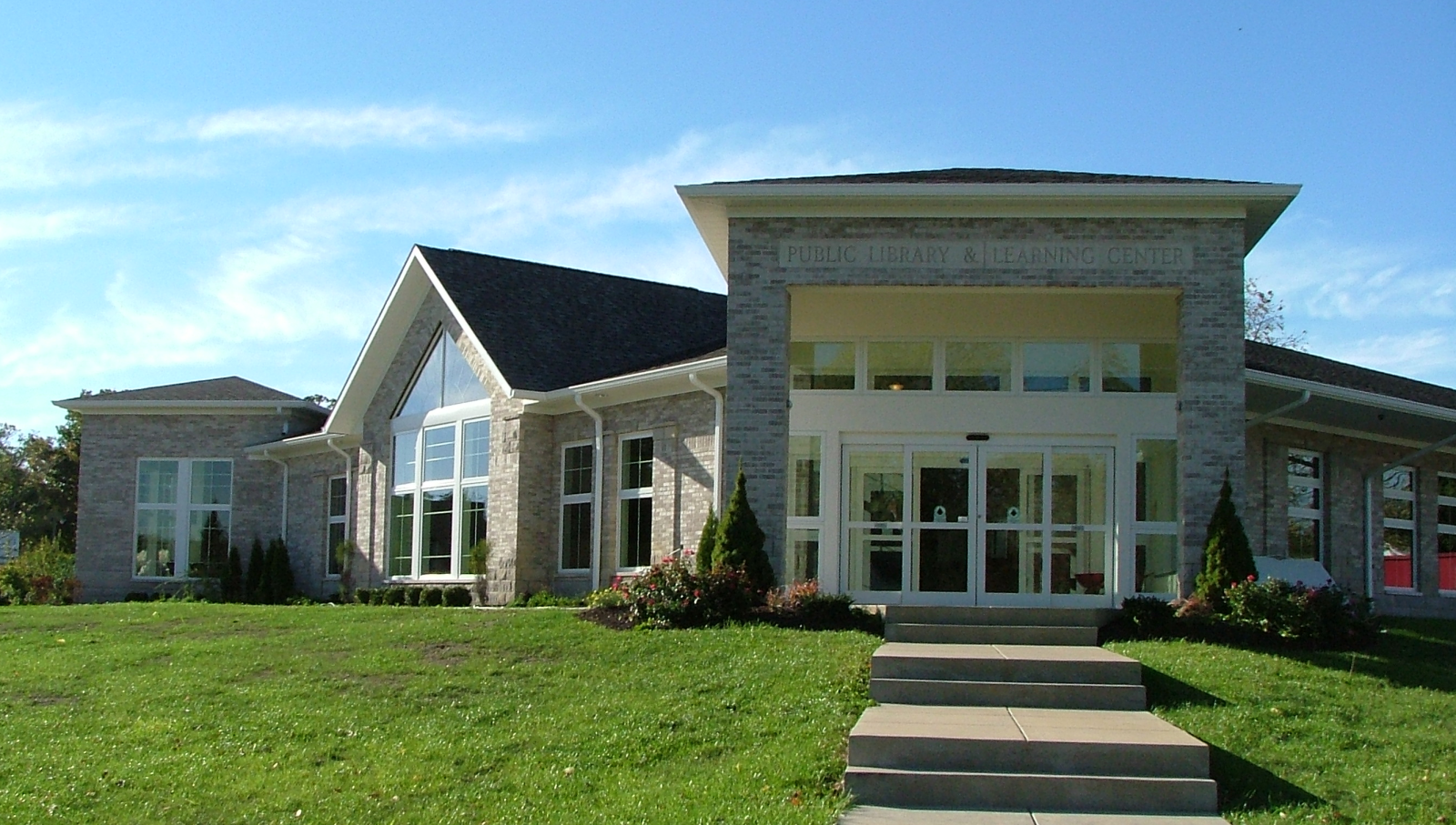
- The new library building, built in 2002
- 40°17′19.17″N 87°17′37.40″W
- Location: Williamsport, Indiana, United States
- Established: 1917

Other information
- Website: http://www.wwtpl.lib.in.us/

The Williamsport-Washington Township Public Library in Williamsport, Washington Township, Warren County, Indiana, was established in 1914 in a borrowed space in a downtown office building. It opened as a Carnegie library in 1917 on Fall Street.

A new library building was completed in 2002 at 28 East Second Street, across State Road 28 from the Warren County Court House and County Jail buildings. This new building was funded primarily with the support of the Warren County Community Foundation (WCCF) and the Community Alliance to Promote Education (CAPE).

In 2006, the new building was heavily damaged by fire. The restored building opened in late 2007.
