= Warrenton, Indiana =

- Ghost town
- Location in Warren County
- Coordinates: 40°18′17″N 87°15′30″W
- Country: United States
- State: Indiana
- County: Warren
- Township: Warren
- Time zone: UTC-5 (Eastern (EST))
  - Summer (DST): UTC-4 (EDT)
- ZIP code: 47918
- Area code: 765

Warrenton is an extinct town in Warren Township, Warren County, in the U.S. state of Indiana. It was the county's original county seat.

== History ==
Warrenton was selected as the Warren County seat in March 1828 by commissioners appointed under the act forming the county. It was laid out "on the east fraction of the southwest quarter of Section 31, Township 22 north, Range 7 west," which today is in the extreme southwestern corner of Warren Township, a little over two miles (3 km) northeast of the current county seat of Williamsport. The site overlooks the confluence of Big Pine Creek with the Wabash River.

The town was surveyed by Perrin Kent and platted by County Agent Luther Tillotson on July 8, 1828, on a tract of land which had been donated to the county by a local landowner named Hollingsworth. Tillotson laid out seven full blocks of eight lots each, four half blocks of four lots each, and a public square of 1.8 acres (7,300 m^{2}). On August 5, 1828, the lots were sold at public auction for between $10 and $20 each, during which free whiskey was served at the county's expense, "probably to loosen the tongue of the auctioneer or 'crier' and the generosity of the buyers".

Warrenton's status as county seat was short-lived. An act approved on January 22, 1829, ordered a relocation of the county seat, and in June 1829 it was moved to nearby Williamsport. Not all the reasons for the move are clear, but an 1883 history cites concerns that "donations" to the county from Warrenton landowners were less than expected, and that much better sums had been received from William Harrison (founder of Williamsport) and Thomas Gilbert. Consequently, "this induced the citizens to wish a re-location of the county seat where the county could receive much greater benefit, or a re-establishment of it at Warrenton if the proprietors of that town would come down, in a handsome manner, with satisfactory donations."

Very few improvements were ever made to the lots at Warrenton and it quickly faded away. No evidence of the town remains at the site.
