= Statue of Joseph Warren (Charlestown, Boston) =

Statue in Boston, Massachusetts, U.S.

- Artist: Henry Dexter
- Year: 1857
- Subject: Joseph Warren
- Location: Boston, Massachusetts, U.S.; 42.376°N 71.060°W

A statue of Joseph Warren is installed in a lodge adjacent to the Bunker Hill Monument in Charlestown, Boston, in the U.S. state of Massachusetts.

== Description and history ==
The statue was sculpted by Henry Dexter based on a portrait of Warren by John Singleton Copley. It was commissioned during the 1850s, unveiled and dedicated on June 17, 1857, and originally housed in a temporary structure. A permanent granite lodge to house the sculpture was built by the Monument Association at the start of the 20th century.
