= Kent and Hitchens Houses =

Historic houses in Indiana, United States

- Kent House and Hitchens House
- U.S. National Register of Historic Places
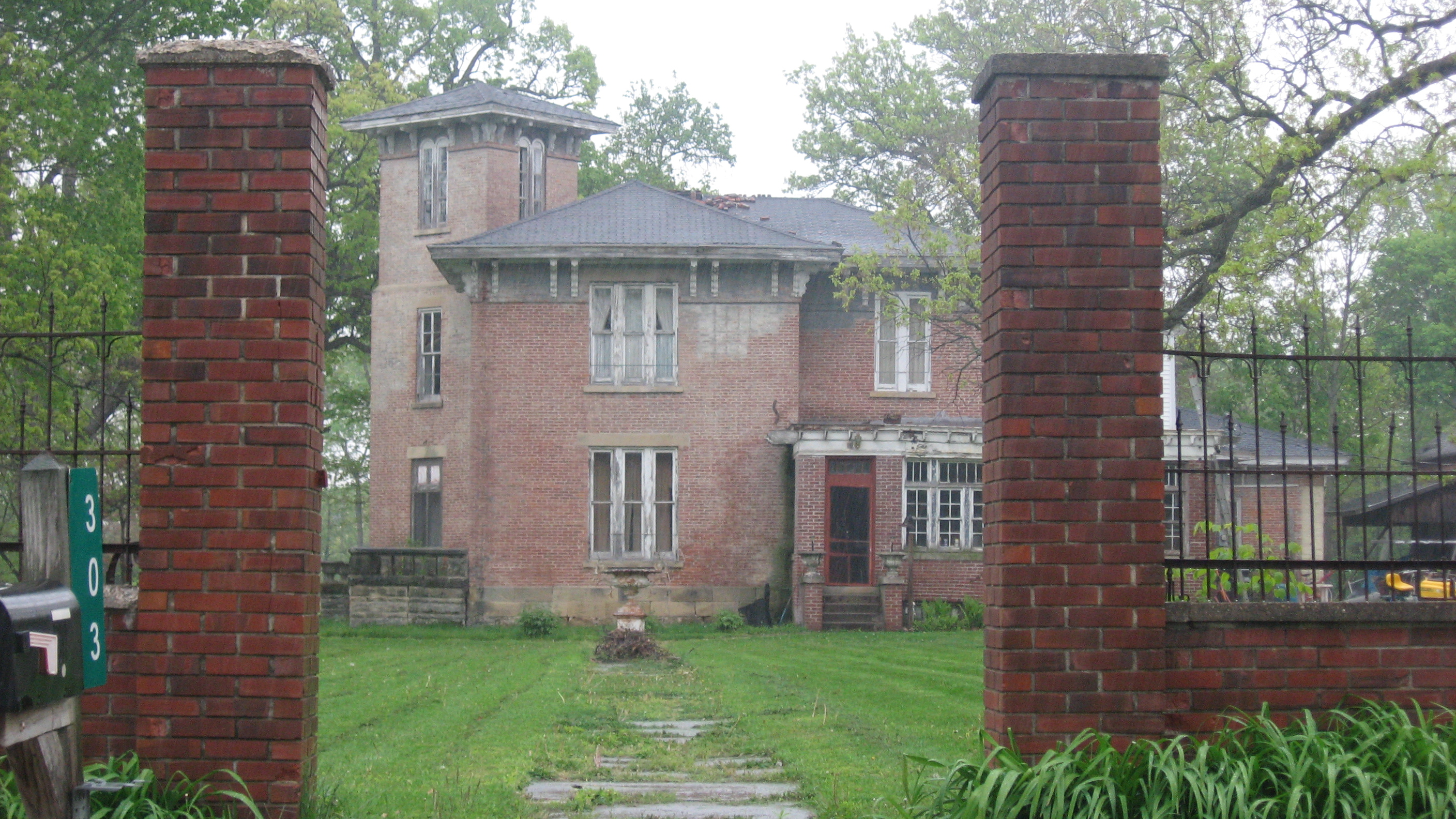
- Hitchens House, April 2012

- Location within Warren County, Indiana Location within Indiana Location within the United States
- Location: 500 Main and 303 Lincoln Sts., Williamsport, Indiana
- Coordinates: 40°16′54″N 87°17′20″W
- Area: 3.5 acres (1.4 ha)
- Built: 1854
- Architectural style: Italian Villa
- NRHP reference No.: 84001719
- Added to NRHP: March 1, 1984

Kent and Hitchens Housese were a matched pair of historic homes located at Williamsport, Indiana. They were built in 1854, and are two-story, Italian Villa style brick dwellings. Each features a three-story corner tower set at an angle to the main part of the building. The houses were originally mirror images of each other. The house at 500 Main was destroyed by a fire in the 1990s.

It was listed on the National Register of Historic Places in 1984.
