= West Lebanon-Pike Township Public Library =

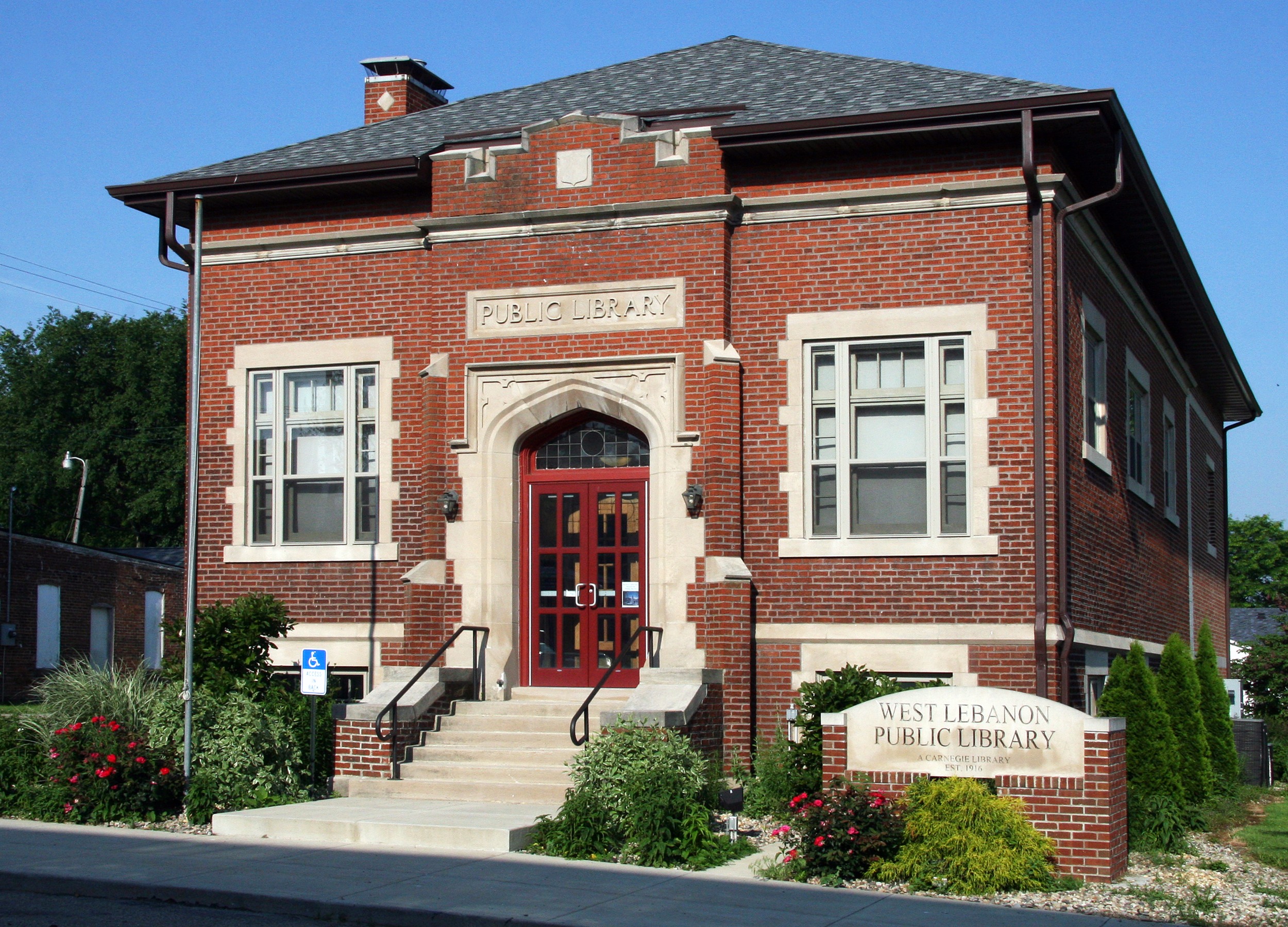
- The front (east) face along High Street
- 40°16′22.00″N 87°23′12.69″W
- Location: West Lebanon, Indiana, United States
- Established: 1916

Other information
- Website: https://westlebanon.lib.in.us/

The West Lebanon-Pike Township Public Library in West Lebanon, Indiana, United States, is a Carnegie library serving southwestern Warren County. Its original 3,060-square-foot (284 m^{2}) brick-and-limestone building was constructed in 1916 using a $7,500 gift from Andrew Carnegie. A $610,000 renovation in 2006 added 1,768 square feet (164.3 m^{2}) of floor space, plus better access for handicapped patrons, more shelf space and a multi-purpose children's activity room. The library's collection contains approximately 12,000 books.
