= Warren County =

Warren County is the name of fourteen counties in the USA. Some are named after General Joseph Warren, who was killed in the Battle of Bunker Hill in the American Revolutionary War:

- Warren County, Georgia
- Warren County, Illinois
- Warren County, Indiana
- Warren County, Iowa
- Warren County, Kentucky
- Warren County, Mississippi
- Warren County, Missouri
- Warren County, New Jersey
- Warren County, New York
- Warren County, North Carolina
- Warren County, Ohio - The most populated county with the name.
- Warren County, Pennsylvania
- Warren County, Tennessee
- Warren County, Virginia
