= Warren Township =

Warren Township may refer to:

== Illinois ==
- Warren Township, Jo Daviess County, Illinois
- Warren Township, Lake County, Illinois

== Indiana ==
- Warren Township, Clinton County, Indiana
- Warren Township, Huntington County, Indiana
- Warren Township, Marion County, Indiana
- Warren Township, Putnam County, Indiana
- Warren Township, St. Joseph County, Indiana
- Warren Township, Warren County, Indiana

== Iowa ==
- Warren Township, Bremer County, Iowa
- Warren Township, Keokuk County, Iowa
- Warren Township, Lucas County, Iowa
- Warren Township, Poweshiek County, Iowa
- Warren Township, Story County, Iowa
- Warren Township, Wayne County, Iowa

== Michigan ==
- Warren Township, Macomb County, Michigan, defunct
- Warren Township, Michigan, in Midland County

== Minnesota ==
- Warren Township, Winona County, Minnesota

== Missouri ==
- Warren Township, Camden County, Missouri
- Warren Township, Marion County, Missouri

== New Jersey ==
- Warren Township, New Jersey

== North Dakota ==
- Warren Township, Cass County, North Dakota, in Cass County, North Dakota

== Ohio ==
- Warren Township, Belmont County, Ohio
- Warren Township, Jefferson County, Ohio
- Warren Township, Trumbull County, Ohio
- Warren Township, Tuscarawas County, Ohio
- Warren Township, Washington County, Ohio

== Pennsylvania ==
- Warren Township, Bradford County, Pennsylvania
- Warren Township, Franklin County, Pennsylvania

== South Dakota ==
- Warren Township, Clark County, South Dakota, in Clark County, South Dakota
- Warren Township, Sanborn County, South Dakota, in Sanborn County, South Dakota

== Utah ==
- Warren Township, Weber County, Utah, in Weber County, Utah

== See also ==
- Warren (disambiguation)
