= Warren Run =

Stream in Noble County, Ohio, U.S.

Coordinates: 39°40′3″N 81°29′6″W

Warren Run is a stream in the Noble County, Ohio.

Warren Run was named for William Warren, a pioneer who settled there in the late 1810s.

== See also ==
- List of rivers of Ohio
