= West Lebanon, Indiana =

- Town
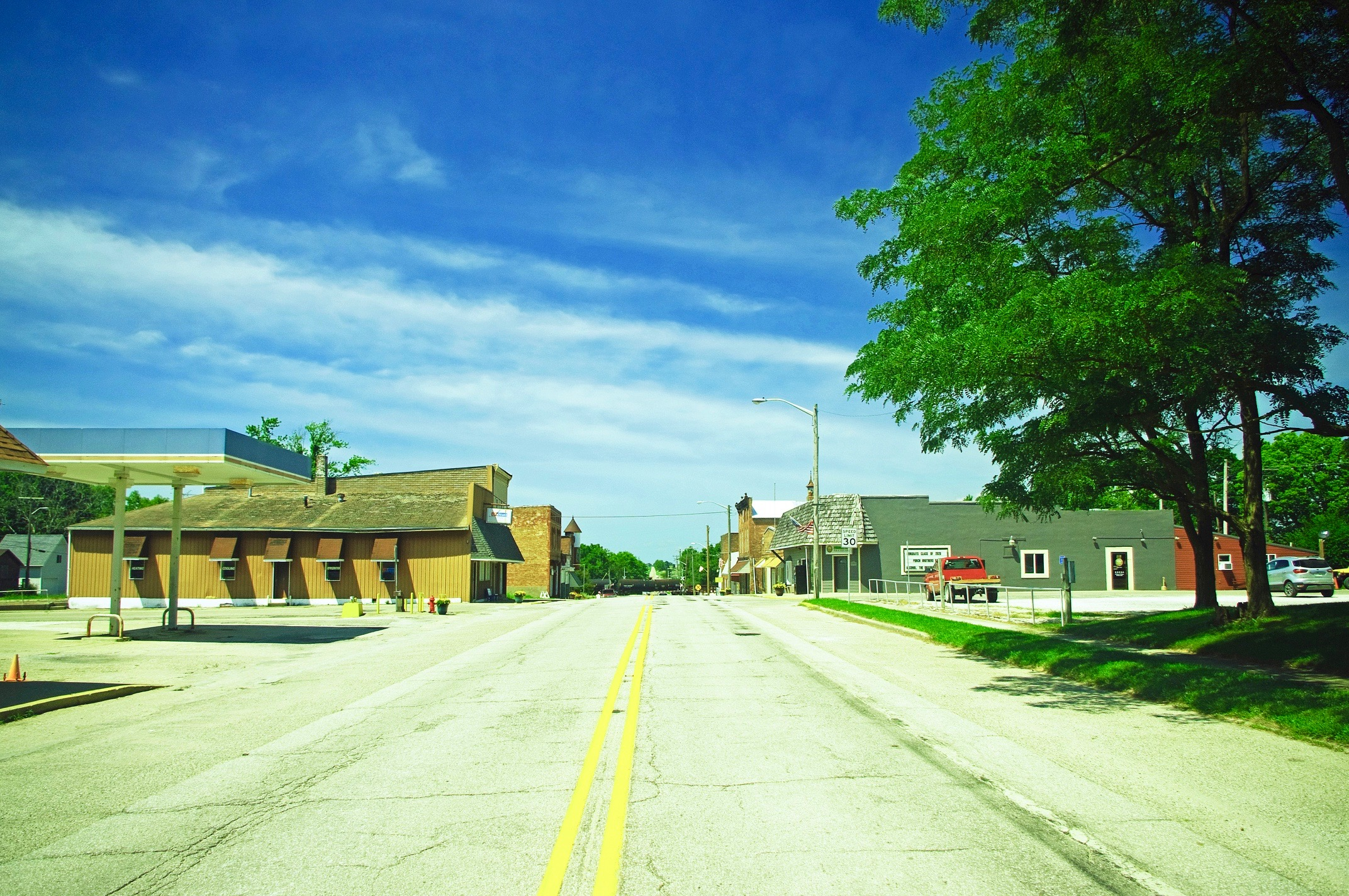
- High Street (SR 263)

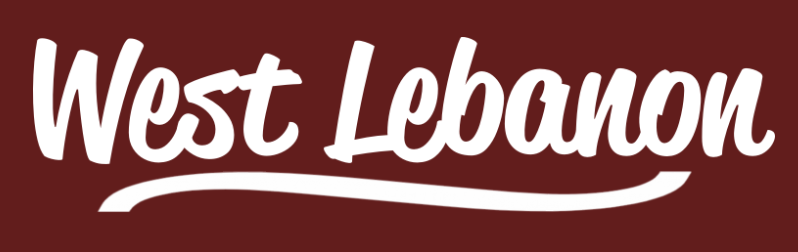
- Logo

- Location within Warren County, Indiana Location within Indiana Location within the United States
- Coordinates: 40°16′21″N 87°23′10″W
- Country: United States
- State: Indiana
- County: Warren
- Township: Pike
- Founded: 1830
- Incorporated: 1869

Area
  - Total: 0.61 sq mi (1.59 km^{2})
  - Land: 0.61 sq mi (1.59 km^{2})
  - Water: 0 sq mi (0.00 km^{2})
- Elevation: 705 ft (215 m)

Population (2020)
  - Total: 678
  - Density: 1,101.6/sq mi (425.34/km^{2})
- Time zone: UTC-5 (Eastern (EST))
  - Summer (DST): UTC-4 (EDT)
- ZIP code: 47991
- Area code: 765
- FIPS code: 18-82934
- GNIS feature ID: 2397733
- Website: westlebanonindiana.com

West Lebanon is a town in Pike Township, Warren County, in the U.S. state of Indiana. The population was 678 at the 2020 census.

== History ==
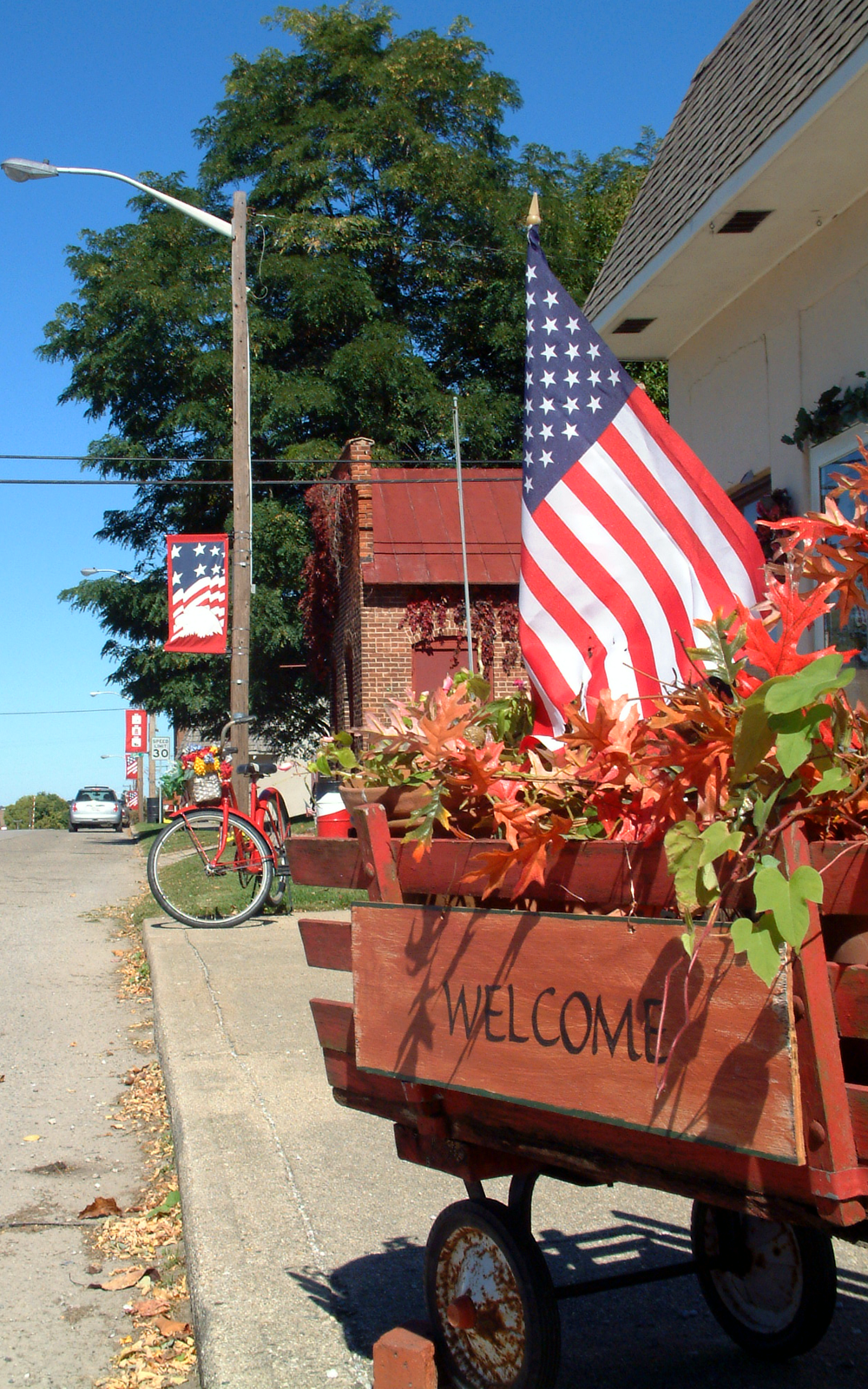
Decorations on High Street

West Lebanon was laid out and platted in the fall of 1830 by Ebenezer Purviance, John G. Jemison and Andrew Fleming, and consisted of 64 lots. Originally named Lebanon, the name was changed to West Lebanon in 1869 when the town was incorporated, possibly in deference to the Boone County community of the same name which established its post office on December 15, 1832, just eleven days before their own.

Not being close to any waterways, West Lebanon's early growth was relatively slow and for many years had no more than 20 families. However, with the completion of the Wabash Railroad line one mile north of town in 1856, the community's fortunes improved and led to most of the town relocating closer to the station. The original settlement area became known as Old Town.

A Carnegie library was built at the corner of High Street and North Street in 1916 and continues to operate as the West Lebanon-Pike Township Public Library.

Fire destroyed part of West Lebanon's business district the evening of January 26, 2011, destroying a row of buildings along the west side of High Street between First and North streets.

== Geography ==
Map of West Lebanon

West Lebanon is located just south of State Road 28 about 7.5 miles (12.1 km) east of the Illinois border and about 5 miles (8.0 km) west of Williamsport. State Road 263 is concurrent with High Street and intersects State Road 28 at the north edge of town. A line of the Norfolk Southern Railway also passes through the north edge of the town. Rock Creek, east of town, flows south toward the Wabash River and forms the township's eastern border; it is fed by the small Johnson Branch which crosses the north edge of town.

According to the 2010 census, West Lebanon has a total area of 0.62 square miles (1.61 km^{2}), all land.

== Demographics ==
Historical population
Census	Pop.	Note	%±
1880	665		—
1890	644		−3.2%
1900	688		6.8%
1910	642		−6.7%
1920	637		−0.8%
1930	595		−6.6%
1940	581		−2.4%
1950	642		10.5%
1960	720		12.1%
1970	899		24.9%
1980	946		5.2%
1990	760		−19.7%
2000	793		4.3%
2010	723		−8.8%
2020	678		−6.2%
U.S. Decennial Census

As of the 2010 United States census, there were 723 people, 287 households, and 192 families residing here. The population density was 1,174.7 inhabitants per square mile (453.6/km^{2}). There were 327 housing units at an average density of 531.3 per square mile (205.1/km^{2}). The racial makeup was 99.2% white, 0.3% Asian, 0.1% American Indian, 0.1% from other races, and 0.3% from two or more races. Those of Hispanic or Latino origin made up 0.1% of the population. In terms of ancestry, 19.8% were German, 8.4% were Irish, and 6.6% were American.

Of the 287 households, 34.8% had children under the age of 18 living with them, 46.3% were married couples living together, 13.2% had a female householder with no husband present, 33.1% were non-families, and 25.8% of all households were made up of individuals. The average household size was 2.52 and the average family size was 2.98. The median age was 37.4 years.

The median income for a household was $49,226 and the median income for a family was $53,708. Males had a median income of $42,500 versus $34,063 for females. The per capita income for was $19,388. About 1.4% of families and 4.1% of the population were below the poverty line, including 3.3% of those under age 18 and 16.3% of those age 65 or over.

== Economy ==
There are more than 25 businesses in West Lebanon. Industry includes Tru-Flex Metal Hose, which has made stripwound and corrugated flexible metal hose since 1962, and Dyna-Fab, which specializes in metal stampings and weldments.

== Education ==
It is in the Metropolitan School District of Warren County. Warren Central Elementary School and Seeger Memorial Junior-Senior High School are both located about a mile-and-a-half north of town.

The town is served by the West Lebanon-Pike Township Public Library, one of two public libraries in Warren County.

== Arts and culture ==
Each year on the last weekend of September the town holds the West Lebanon Patriot Festival, an event named for the Patriot mascot of nearby Seeger High School. The festival features flea market vendors, a parade, cake walks, live music, fireman's water ball competition, outhouse races and other attractions. The festival was previously known as West Lebanon Fun Days.
