= Williamsport Falls =

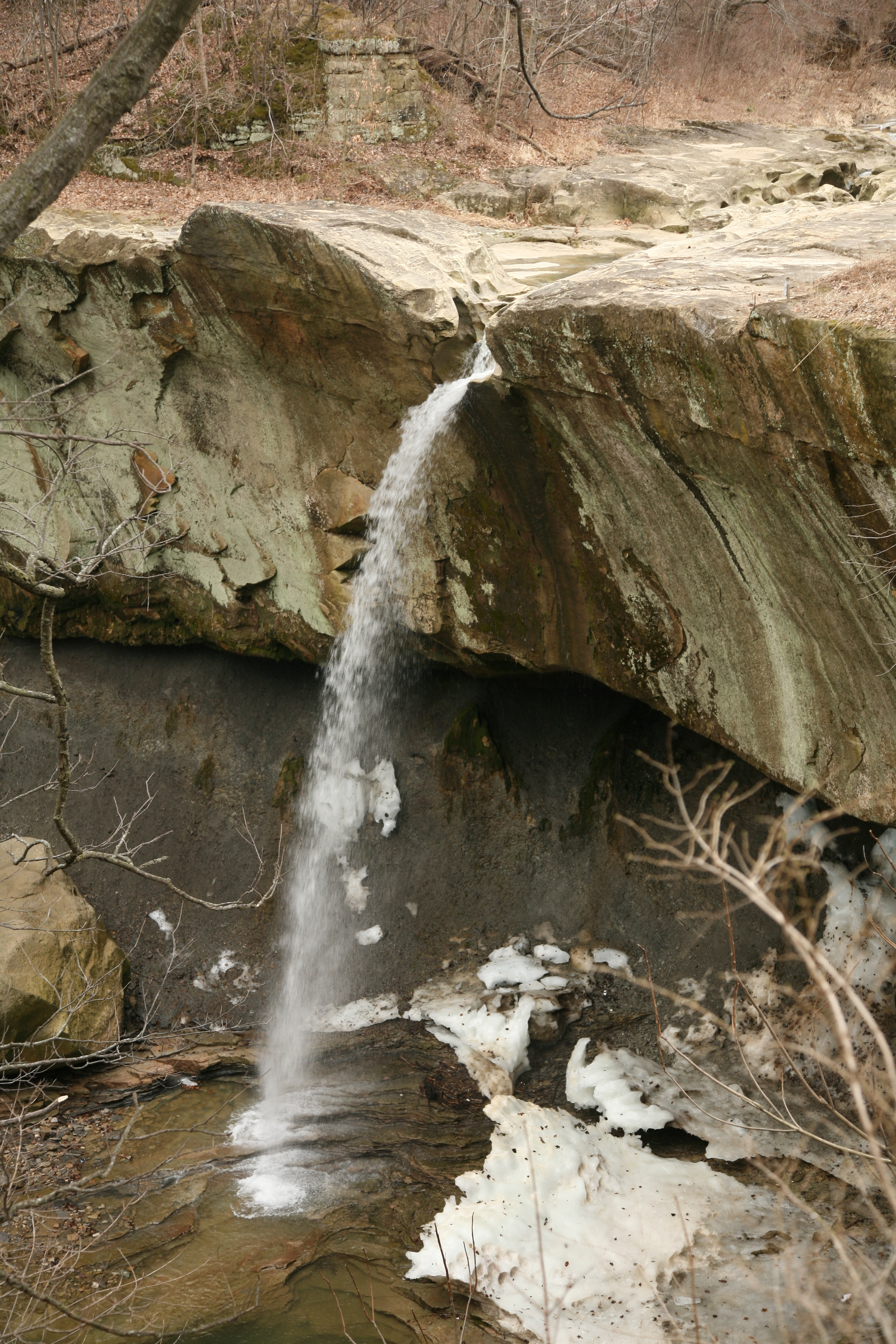
- The falls in March 2009
- Interactive map of Williamsport Falls
- Location: Warren County, Indiana
- Coordinates: 40°17′10″N 87°17′33″W
- Type: plunge
- Total height: 90 feet (27 m)

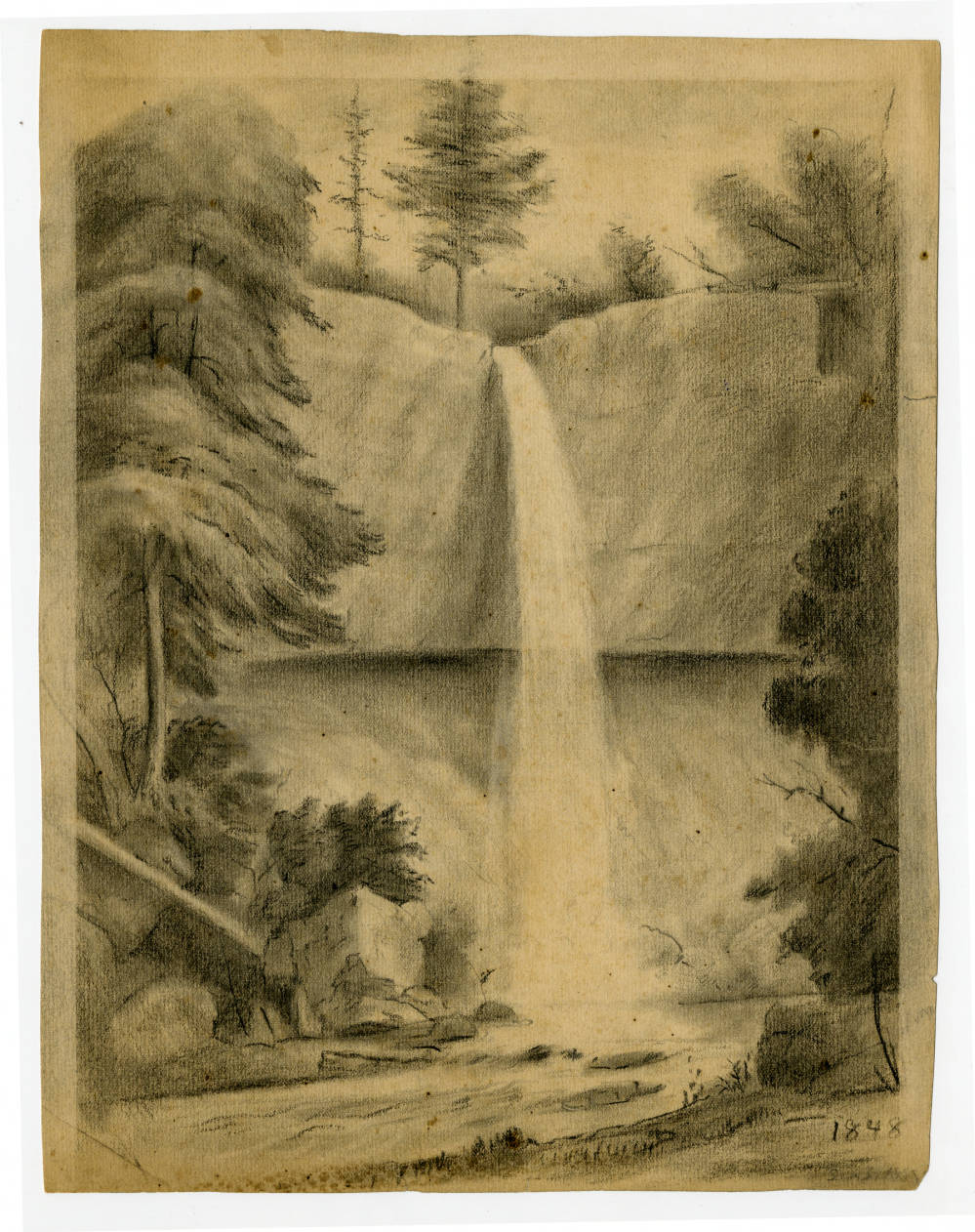
Drawing of Williamsport Falls in Warren County

Williamsport Falls is a waterfall near the center of the town of Williamsport, the county seat of Warren County, Indiana. With a height of 90 feet (27 m), it is the tallest waterfall in Indiana.

Fall Branch flows through the town between the old part of the town (nearer the river) and the newer part (established when the railroad was constructed through the area). Near the point where Monroe Street crosses the railroad, the creek falls over a sandstone ledge. The actual height of the waterfall has changed somewhat over the years, as pieces of the ledge have sheared off and fallen to the bottom of the falls. Below the falls, sandstone used to be quarried and was used to build the foundations of many local buildings.

The water flow was sufficiently substantial in the 19th century to support a mill located below the falls; but the flow is less consistent now, and the falls are frequently quiet. This is due to the conversion of woodlands and grasslands to intensive mechanized farming and the diversion of natural water flows to impoundments used to provide reliable water supplies for irrigation and other purposes. A feasibility study on providing a steady flow of water was conducted, but the expense was determined to be too great.

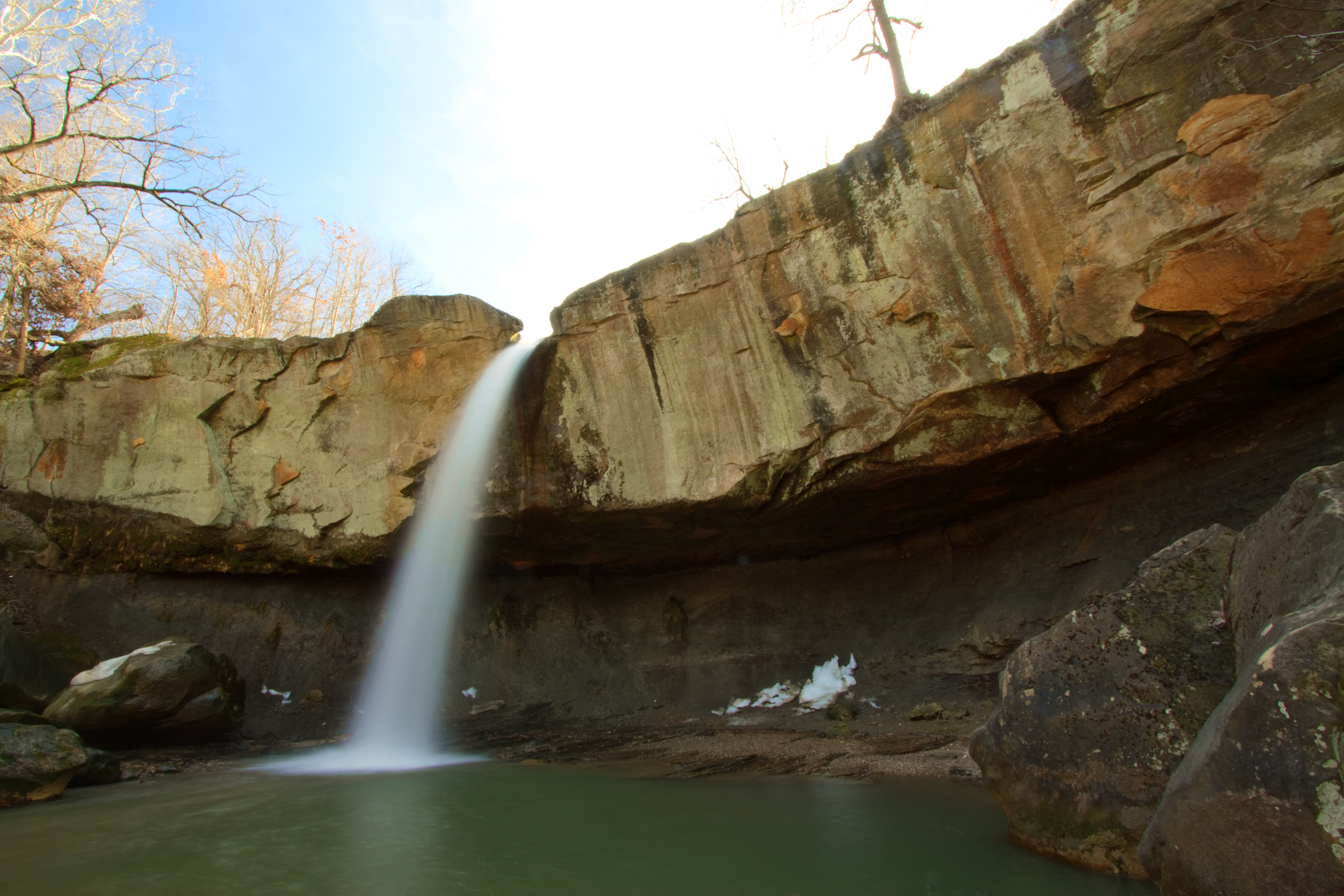
Williamsport Falls in the early Spring

== See also ==
- List of waterfalls
