= Williamsport, Indiana =

- Town
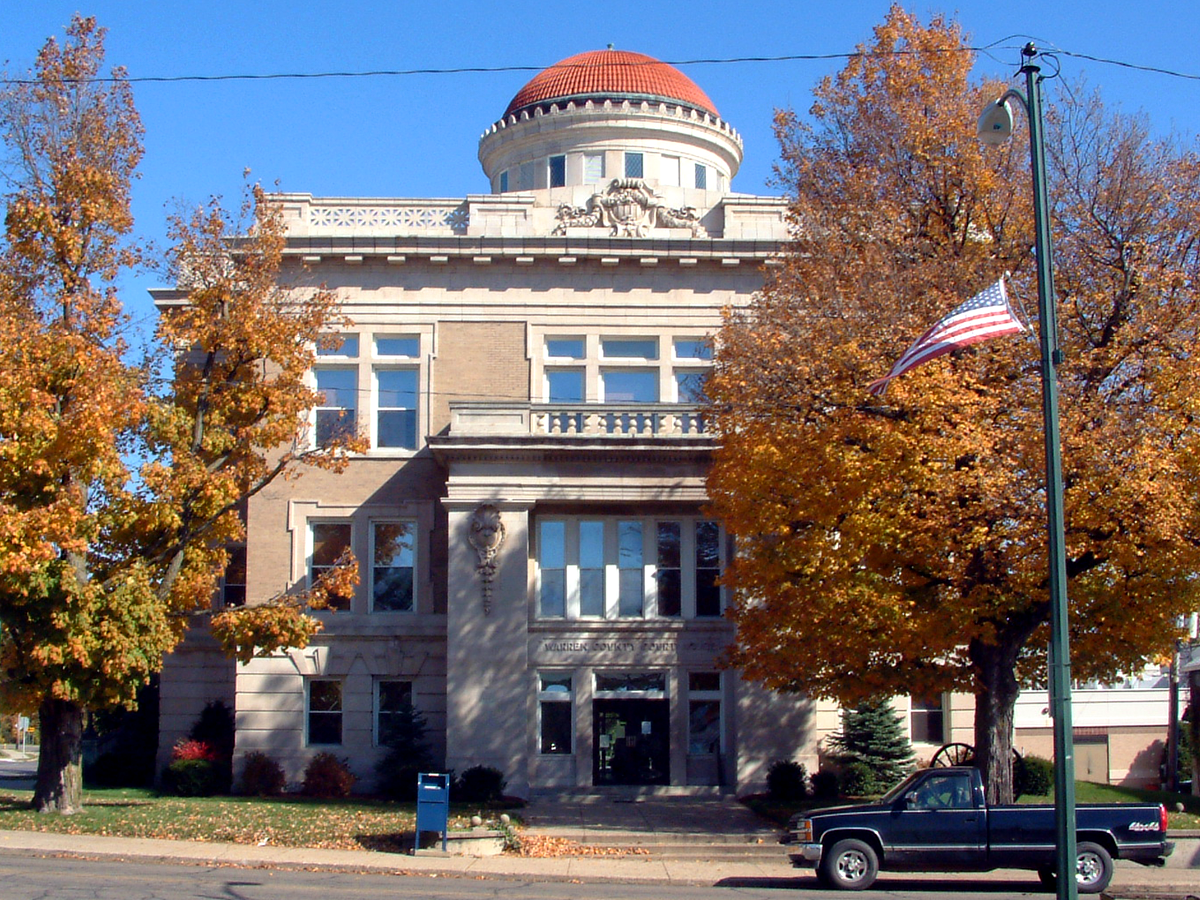
- Warren County courthouse in Williamsport

- Location within Warren County, Indiana Location within Indiana Location within the United States
- Coordinates: 40°17′18″N 87°17′32″W
- Country: United States
- State: Indiana
- County: Warren
- Township: Washington
- Founded: 1828
- Incorporated: 1854
- Founder: William Harrison

Area
  - Total: 1.31 sq mi (3.38 km^{2})
  - Land: 1.31 sq mi (3.38 km^{2})
  - Water: 0 sq mi (0.00 km^{2})
- Elevation: 627 ft (191 m)

Population (2020)
  - Total: 1,950
  - Density: 1,494.7/sq mi (577.11/km^{2})
- Time zone: UTC-5 (Eastern (EST))
  - Summer (DST): UTC-4 (EDT)
- ZIP code: 47993
- Area code: 765
- FIPS code: 18-84410
- GNIS feature ID: 2397746
- Website: www.townofwilliamsport.com

Williamsport is a town in Washington Township, Warren County, Indiana, United States. The population was 1,950 at the 2020 census. It is the county seat of Warren County and is the largest of the four incorporated towns in the county. Williamsport Falls is located in downtown Williamsport.

== History ==
Williamsport was platted by (and named for) William Harrison on December 11, 1828, on the south end of the eastern fractional part of the northeast quarter of section 11, township 21, range 8. Harrison was the first to occupy the town in the fall of 1828; he built a log house at the east end of Main Street near the river and operated a ferry crossing there for several years. Though located on the opposite side of the river from the Wabash and Erie Canal, Williamsport sought to draw shipping traffic by constructing a short cut-off canal. Finished around 1852, the project led to the nickname "Side-Cut City".

Williamsport became the county seat in June 1829, taking the title away from short-lived Warrenton. Its post office was the first in the county and has operated since September 28, 1829. The town was incorporated in March 1854, at which time its population was 552.

James Frank Hanly, who was the Governor of Indiana from 1905 to 1909, lived and practiced law here from 1879 to 1896; he is buried at Hillside Cemetery, on the northeast side of town.

The Williamsport-Washington Township Public Library opened in 1917 as a Carnegie library, and moved to a new facility in 2002.

=== Historic places ===
The Williamsport Presbyterian Church at 15 Fall Street, built in 1889, appears on the Indiana Register of Historic Sites and Structures. It was closed in 1964 and stood vacant until 1991, when a non-profit corporation was set up to support the restoration effort. It was listed in 1998 after having received a new slate roof and other repairs. The building contains the original stained glass windows, bell, pulpit, and pews.

The "Tower House" can be found at 303 Lincoln Street and was constructed in 1854. The house was nicknamed due to its three-story tower on the northeast corner of the building. The house was originally constructed as a mirrored twin; the twin house was destroyed by a fire in the 1990s. The house has changed from its original construction. An enclosed front porch and side porch has been retooled to serve as the current family's kitchen area. The house originally contained two large rooms upstairs, and three rooms downstairs. What appears to be the summer kitchen and original carriage house still stand. The house now has five bedrooms, one bath upstairs and seven rooms, an enclosed porch, and a bath downstairs. They were listed on the National Register of Historic Places in 1984 as the Kent and Hitchens Houses.

The Warren County Courthouse at 125 North Monroe Street was built in 1907-1908 and is on the United States National Register of Historic Places. It is the fourth purpose-built court house in the county's history.

Map of Williamsport

== Geography ==
Williamsport is located along State Road 28 near the shores of the Wabash River which forms the eastern border of the county. Its most striking natural feature is Williamsport Falls, a 90-foot waterfall near the center of town and Indiana's tallest. Williamsport's original section ("Old Town") is in bottom land next to the river; "New Town" was built on the hill above it to be closer to the railroad. The rail line through town is currently operated by Norfolk Southern Railway.

According to the 2010 census, Williamsport has a total area of 1.3 square miles (3.37 km^{2}), all land.

== Demographics ==
Historical population
Census	Pop.	Note	%±
1850	279		—
1860	520		86.4%
1870	988		90.0%
1880	913		−7.6%
1890	1,027		12.5%
1900	1,245		21.2%
1910	1,243		−0.2%
1920	1,088		−12.5%
1930	1,053		−3.2%
1940	1,222		16.0%
1950	1,241		1.6%
1960	1,353		9.0%
1970	1,661		22.8%
1980	1,747		5.2%
1990	1,798		2.9%
2000	1,935		7.6%
2010	1,898		−1.9%
2020	1,950		2.7%
U.S. Decennial Census

=== 2020 census ===
As of the 2020 census, Williamsport had a population of 1,950. The median age was 40.7 years. 23.1% of residents were under the age of 18 and 21.2% of residents were 65 years of age or older. For every 100 females there were 93.3 males, and for every 100 females age 18 and over there were 92.4 males age 18 and over.

0.0% of residents lived in urban areas, while 100.0% lived in rural areas.

There were 755 households in Williamsport, of which 29.8% had children under the age of 18 living in them. Of all households, 48.1% were married-couple households, 18.3% were households with a male householder and no spouse or partner present, and 27.8% were households with a female householder and no spouse or partner present. About 32.5% of all households were made up of individuals and 17.2% had someone living alone who was 65 years of age or older.

There were 839 housing units, of which 10.0% were vacant. The homeowner vacancy rate was 2.1% and the rental vacancy rate was 13.1%.

Racial composition as of the 2020 census
Race	Number	Percent
White	1,850	94.9%
Black or African American	5	0.3%
American Indian and Alaska Native	0	0.0%
Asian	9	0.5%
Native Hawaiian and Other Pacific Islander	1	0.1%
Some other race	8	0.4%
Two or more races	77	3.9%
Hispanic or Latino (of any race)	26	1.3%

=== 2010 census ===
As of the 2010 United States census, there were 1,898 people, 766 households, and 513 families residing here. The population density was 1,457.6 inhabitants per square mile (562.8/km^{2}). There were 852 housing units at an average density of 654.3 per square mile (252.6/km^{2}). The racial makeup was 98.3% white, 0.5% Asian, 0.3% black or African American, 0.2% Pacific islander, 0.1% American Indian, 0.3% from other races, and 0.4% from two or more races. Those of Hispanic or Latino origin made up 1.0% of the population. In terms of ancestry, 22.0% were German, 10.4% were American, 9.2% were Irish, and 5.7% were English.

Of the 766 households, 31.5% had children under the age of 18 living with them, 49.5% were married couples living together, 12.3% had a female householder with no husband present, 33.0% were non-families, and 29.6% of all households were made up of individuals. The average household size was 2.37 and the average family size was 2.90. The median age was 42.5 years.

=== Income and poverty ===
The median income for a household was $37,969 and the median income for a family was $48,026. Males had a median income of $41,719 versus $28,875 for females. The per capita income was $17,487. About 16.3% of families and 19.2% of the population were below the poverty line, including 29.0% of those under age 18 and 9.2% of those age 65 or over.

== Education ==
It is in the Metropolitan School District of Warren County.

The town is served by the Williamsport-Washington Township Public Library, one of two public libraries in Warren County.

== Economy ==
Industry in Williamsport includes TMF Center, which manufactures parts for construction equipment and trucking; GL Technologies, which procures industrial tooling; and Kuri-Tec, which manufactures industrial hoses and accessories.

The town includes the county's single hospital, St. Vincent Williamsport Hospital, a 16-bed acute care facility operated by Indianapolis-based St. Vincent Health. The hospital includes a 24-hour emergency medical service and ambulance service. Williamsport also has a nursing home, "Williamsport Nursing and Rehabilitation", that provides health care and rehabilitation services primarily for seniors. These are important local employers, as 9.8% of Warren County's jobs relate to health care and social services.

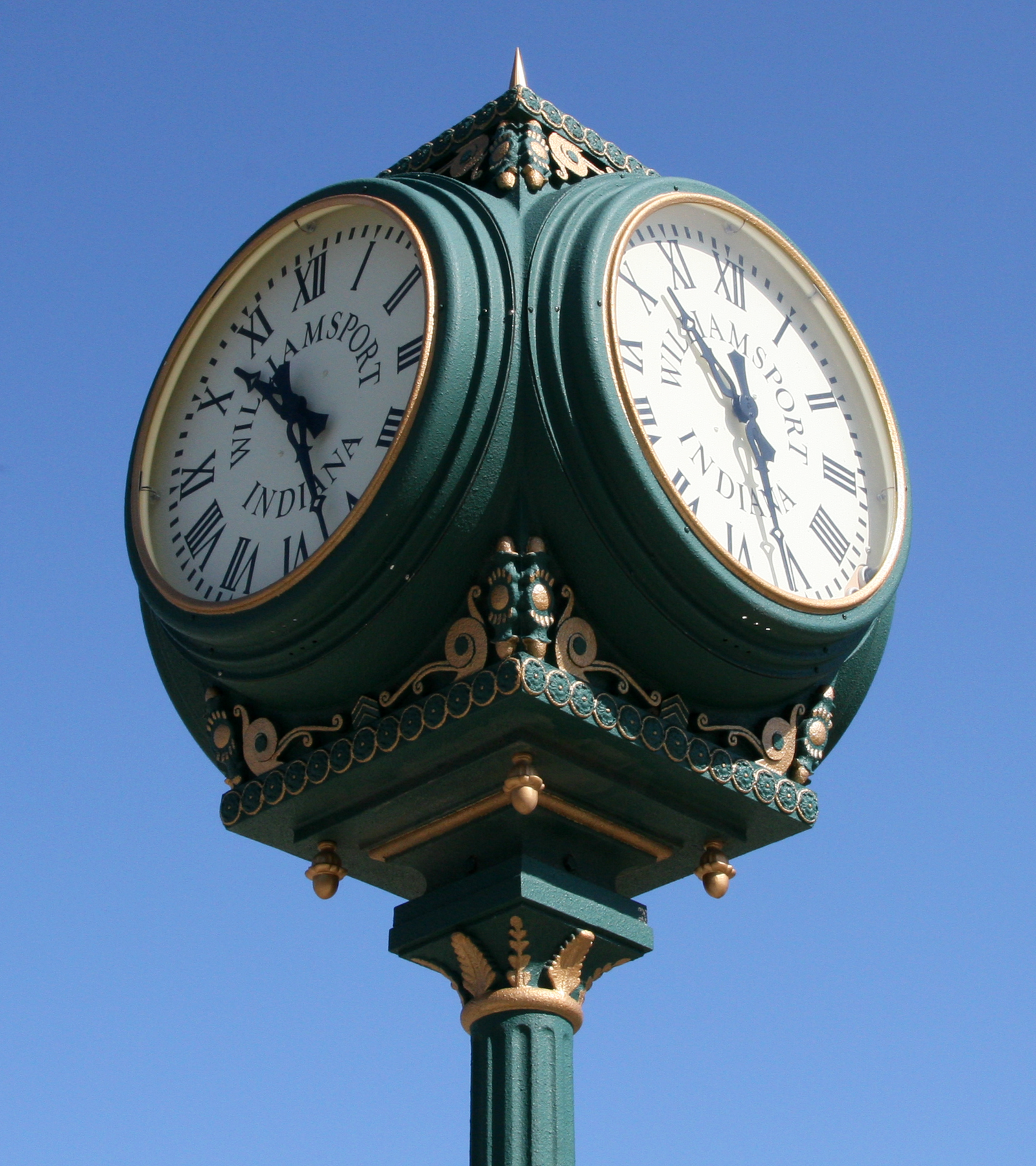
The town clock

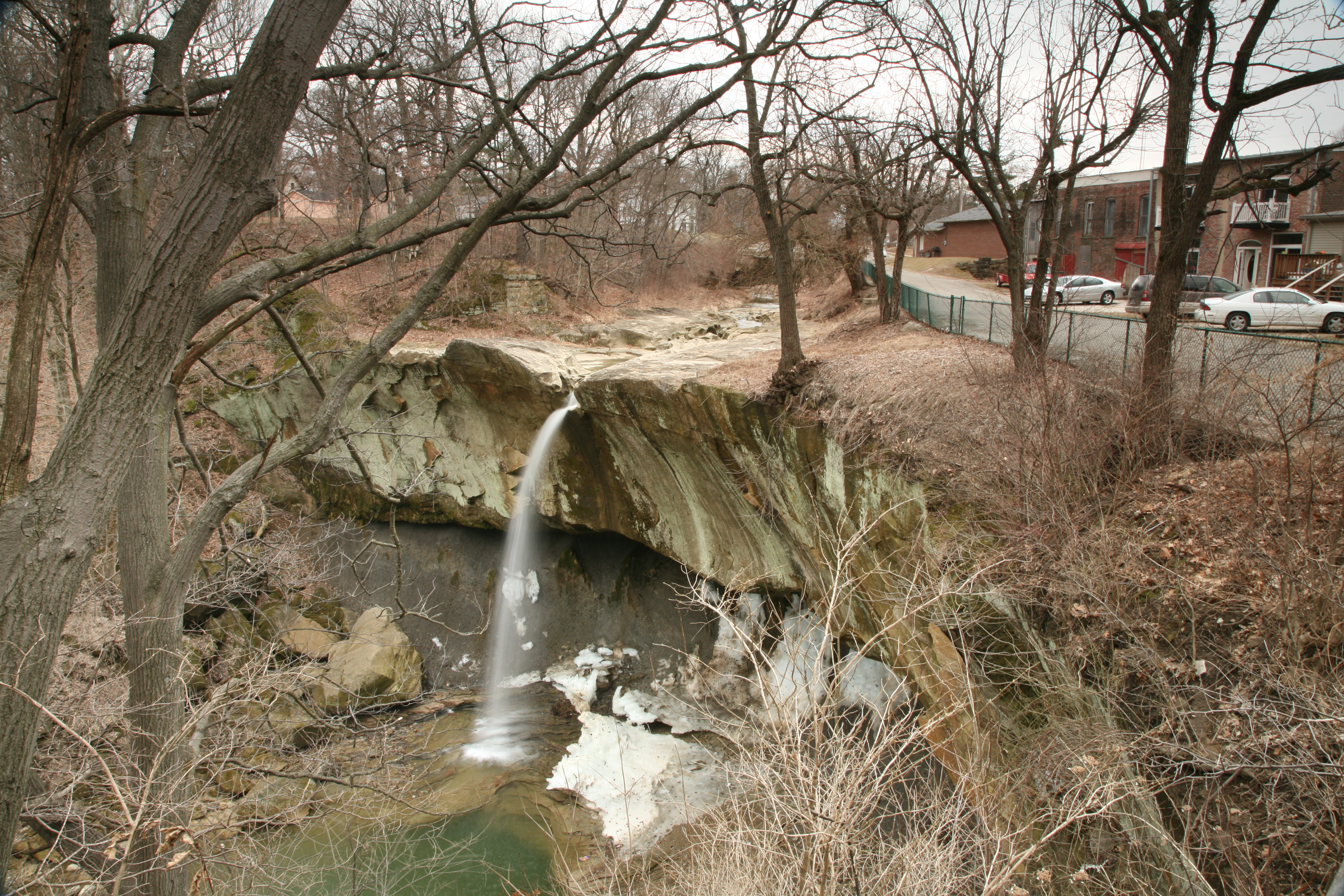
Williamsport Falls

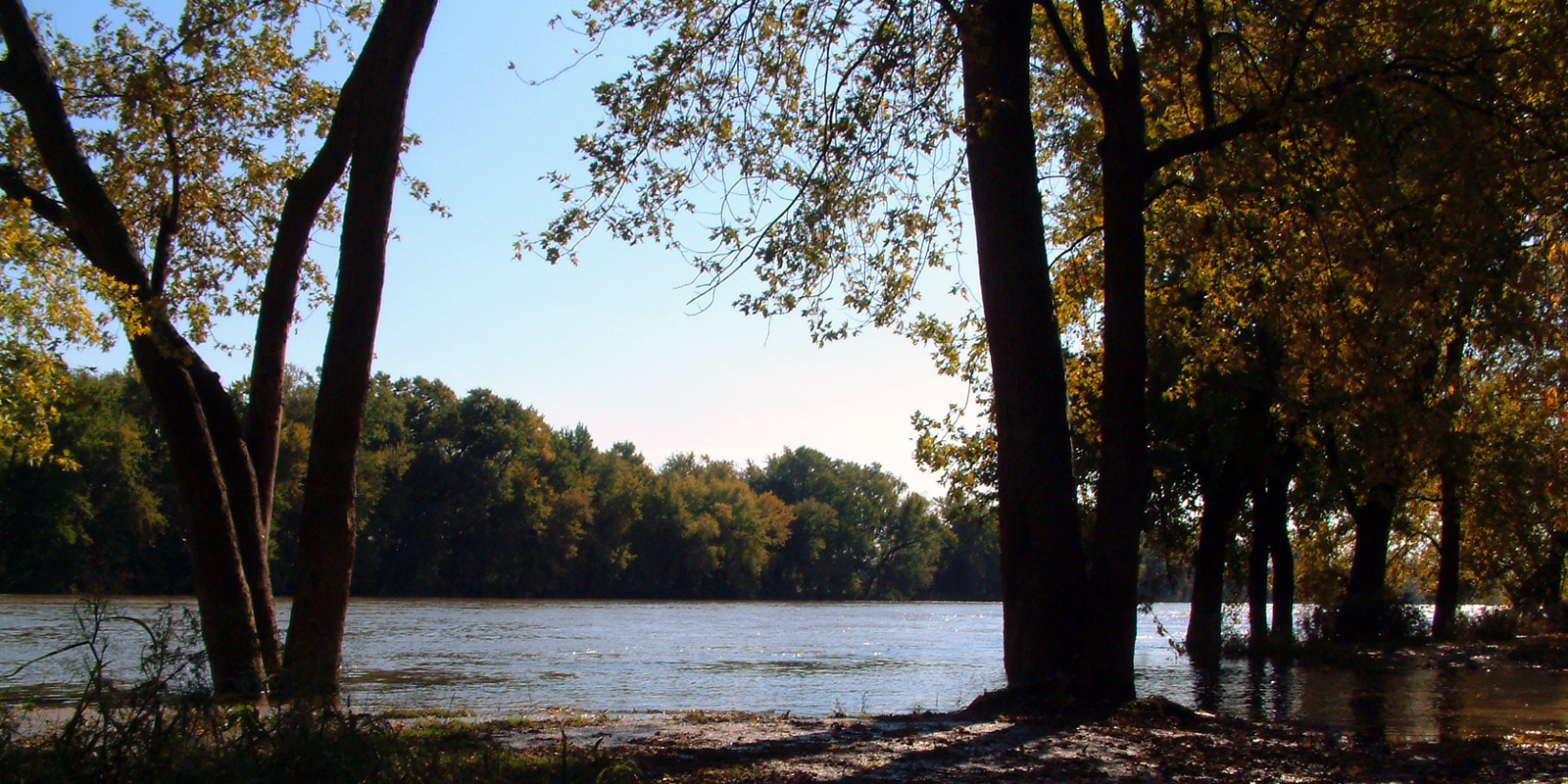
The Wabash River as seen from Old Town

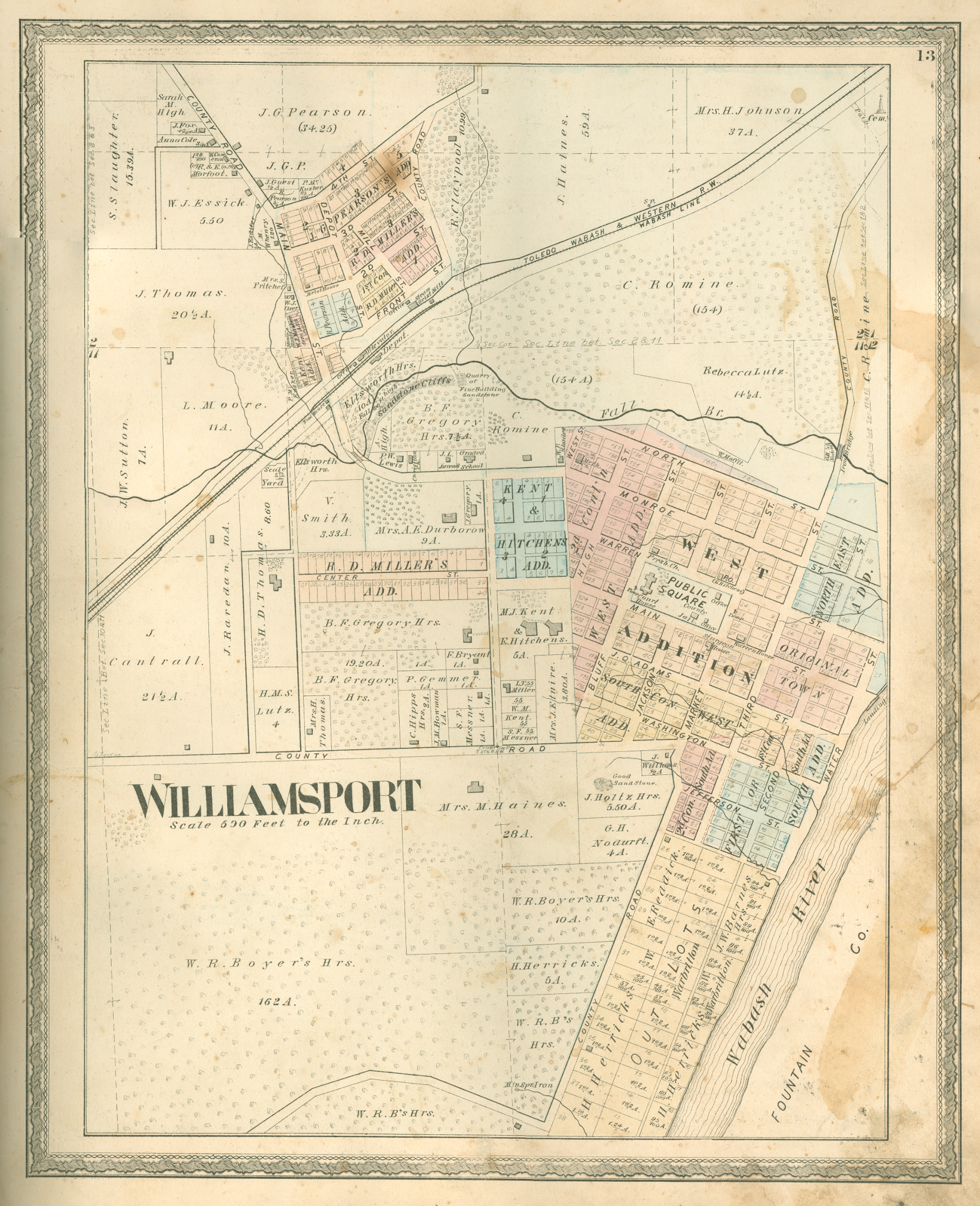
1877 map of Williamsport

== Notable people ==
- Matt Commons, Indiana State Representative
- Emily Caroline Chandler Hodgin (1838–1907), temperance reformer
- P. K. Spencer (1848–1910), state representative
- Ele Stansbury (born 1861), 23rd Indiana Attorney General
