= Warren Township, Jo Daviess County, Illinois =

Warren Township
- Township
- Location in Jo Daviess County

- Jo Daviess County's location in Illinois
- Coordinates: 42°28′57″N 90°01′15″W
- Country: United States
- State: Illinois
- County: Jo Daviess
- Established: November 2, 1852

Government
  - Supervisor: Laura Busch

Area
  - Total: 19.71 sq mi (51.0 km^{2})
  - Land: 19.71 sq mi (51.0 km^{2})
  - Water: 0 sq mi (0 km^{2}) 0%
- Elevation: 997 ft (304 m)

Population (2020)
  - Total: 1,487
  - Density: 75.44/sq mi (29.13/km^{2})
- Time zone: UTC-6 (CST)
  - Summer (DST): UTC-5 (CDT)
- ZIP codes: 61001, 61087
- FIPS code: 17-085-78864

Warren Township is one of twenty-three townships in Jo Daviess County, Illinois, United States. As of the 2020 census, its population was 1,487, and it contained 733 housing units. Its name changed from Courtland Township in 1865.

== Geography ==
According to the 2021 census gazetteer files, Warren Township has a total area of 19.71 square miles (51.05 km^{2}), all land.

=== Cities, towns, villages ===
- Village of Warren

=== Cemeteries ===
The township contains two cemeteries: Elmwood and Saint Annes Catholic.

=== Major highways ===
- Illinois Route 78

== Demographics ==
As of the 2020 census there were 1,487 people, 580 households, and 383 families residing in the township. The population density was 75.44 inhabitants per square mile (29.13/km^{2}). There were 733 housing units at an average density of 37.19 per square mile (14.36/km^{2}). The racial makeup of the township was 95.29% White, 0.00% African American, 0.13% Native American, 0.00% Asian, 0.00% Pacific Islander, 1.34% from other races, and 3.23% from two or more races. Hispanic or Latino of any race were 2.29% of the population.

There were 580 households, out of which 21.40% had children under the age of 18 living with them, 50.86% were married couples living together, 14.14% had a female householder with no spouse present, and 33.97% were non-families. 27.80% of all households were made up of individuals, and 14.30% had someone living alone who was 65 years of age or older. The average household size was 2.23 and the average family size was 2.74.

The township's age distribution consisted of 21.1% under the age of 18, 4.9% from 18 to 24, 15.5% from 25 to 44, 29% from 45 to 64, and 29.5% who were 65 years of age or older. The median age was 50.5 years. For every 100 females, there were 87.4 males. For every 100 females age 18 and over, there were 95.4 males.

The median income for a household in the township was $50,735, and the median income for a family was $66,016. Males had a median income of $45,263 versus $27,188 for females. The per capita income for the township was $27,802. About 6.3% of families and 9.5% of the population were below the poverty line, including 7.8% of those under age 18 and 9.4% of those age 65 or over.

Historical population
Census	Pop.	Note	%±
2000	1,688		—
2010	1,601		−5.2%
2020	1,487		−7.1%
U.S. Decennial Census

== School districts ==
- Warren Community Unit School District 205

== Political districts ==
- Illinois' 16th congressional district
- State House District 89
- State Senate District 45
