= Warren Township, Warren County, Indiana =

Warren Township
- Township
- Location of Warren Township in Warren County

- Location of Indiana in the United States
- Coordinates: 40°20′56″N 87°11′22″W
- Country: United States
- State: Indiana
- County: Warren
- Established: 1827

Government
  - Type: Indiana township

Area
  - Total: 36.4 sq mi (94 km^{2})
  - Land: 35.9 sq mi (93 km^{2})
  - Water: 0.51 sq mi (1.3 km^{2}) 1.40%
- Elevation: 630 ft (192 m)

Population (2020)
  - Total: 717
  - Density: 20.0/sq mi (7.71/km^{2})
- Time zone: UTC-5 (Eastern (EST))
  - Summer (DST): UTC-4 (EDT)
- Area code: 765
- GNIS feature ID: 453979

Warren Township is one of twelve townships in Warren County, Indiana, United States. According to the 2020 census, its population was 717 and it contained 322 housing units.

Historical population
Census	Pop.	Note	%±
1890	1,312		—
1900	1,270		−3.2%
1910	1,076		−15.3%
1920	977		−9.2%
1930	805		−17.6%
1940	852		5.8%
1950	759		−10.9%
1960	746		−1.7%
1970	756		1.3%
1980	711		−6.0%
1990	699		−1.7%
2000	754		7.9%
2010	806		6.9%
2020	717		−11.0%
Source: US Decennial Census

== History ==
Warren Township was one of the original four created when the county was organized in 1827.

== Geography ==
According to the 2010 census, the township has a total area of 36.4 square miles (94 km^{2}), of which 35.9 square miles (93 km^{2}) (or 98.63%) is land and 0.51 square miles (1.3 km^{2}) (or 1.40%) is water. Kates Pond is in this township, and the streams of Dry Branch, Kickapoo Creek, Little Pine Creek, Middle Branch and West Fork Kickapoo Creek run through it.

The small town of Independence is on the shores of the Wabash River in the southeastern part of the township. Winthrop is in the northwest portion of the township.

The original county seat of Warrenton was located in the far southwestern corner of what is now Warren Township, though at that time the township had not yet been created; no trace of Warrenton now exists. Other towns in this township that have ceased to exist include Black Rock, and Glen Cliff.

Map of Warren Township

=== Cemeteries ===
The township contains these three cemeteries: Bethel, Independence and James.

=== Transportation ===
U.S. Route 41 passes through the far southwestern tip of the township on its way to Attica. Indiana State Road 55 runs along the western border of the township, connecting Attica with Pine Village to the north in neighboring Adams Township. The township contains Smith Brothers Airport.

== Education ==
Warren Township is part of the Metropolitan School District of Warren County.

== Government ==
Warren Township has a trustee who administers rural fire protection and ambulance service, provides relief to the poor, manages cemetery care, and performs farm assessment, among other duties. The trustee is assisted in these duties by a three-member township board. The trustees and board members are elected to four-year terms.

Warren Township is part of Indiana's 8th congressional district, Indiana House of Representatives District 26, and Indiana State Senate District 23.
