= Galena–Chicago trail =

The Galena–Chicago trail was a stagecoach route located in northern Illinois that ran from the mid-to-late 1830s until 1854 (172 years ago). As indicated by its name, the route linked Chicago, located in the northeast of the state, with Galena which was located in the lead mining district of the northwest. The Chicago-Galena trail includes the "Stagecoach Trail" that runs between Galena and Lena, Illinois. East of Lena the stage route follows U.S. Route 20 and Business U.S. Route 20 through Eleroy, Freeport and Rockford to Belvidere. This road began as the old State Road number 2 established on 15 January 1836 and laid out by June 1837.

Early inns were log structures similar to the houses in the area. They were soon replaced by wood frame, brick or stone buildings with better accommodations. Several historic stone stagecoach inns remain along the trail in Jo Daviess and Stephenson Counties. These include the Old Stone Hotel (1851) now the Warren Community Building; the Thomas S. French house, a residence southeast of Waddams Grove; Dodd's Inn (1848) a residence on Lena Street in Lena; the Stage Inn east of Eleroy; and Tisdel Inn (1852) a residence west of Freeport.

== History ==
The line traced its beginnings to as early as 1835 as a series of smaller trails, all operated by distinct stagecoach owners. A single trail linking Chicago to Galena was formally established in 1839 by John Frink and Martin Walker, who later established Frink, Walker & Company in 1840. Frink & Walker expanded their pre-existing trail from Chicago to Galena, putting a competing Chicago-Freeport stagecoach line run by J.D. Winters out of business. Frink & Walker ran two daily coaches that carried mail, passengers and small parcels from Chicago to Galena. A published sketch of the Frink, Walker & Company General Stage Office in Chicago shows a Concord style coach with a four−horse hitch. Concord coaches were brightly painted and attracted a lot of attention when the stage arrived in town. The stage office, located at Lake and Dearborn Streets as early as 1833, appeared on a map of Chicago landmarks from that year.

Naperville, a crossroad of several stage routes in the 1830s, was the first major stop west of Chicago. After 1848 coaches could travel on the Southwestern Plank Road (now Ogden Avenue), a toll road made of wooden planks laid crosswise on long timbers to form a roadbed on what had been an old Indian trail. The stage traffic on this road was so successful that Naperville businessmen rejected the Galena and Chicago Union Railroad's request for a right–of–way because they feared the competition. The railroad went to Wheaton instead.

Rockford was named in 1837 for the rock bottomed ford across the Rock River that enabled stagecoaches to safely cross. It was earlier known as Midway, the midpoint on the trail between Galena and Chicago. A 1968 historical map of Rockford shows the site of the stagecoach barn at the north end of Kishwaukee Street, with a dam on the old ford site. East State Street, now Business U.S. Route 20, is labeled ″part of original stagecoach road″.

The long–vanished Vanceborough post office was in Twelve–Mile Grove, a stop in western Winnebago County. Postage for letters brought by the stage was 25 cents each, paid by the recipient. Twelve–Mile Grove Cemetery south of the village of Pecatonica has permanent wheel ruts from the stagecoach road near a utility building.

Martha Malvina Snow (Mrs. Oscar Taylor) of Freeport rode the Frink & Walker stagecoach from Chicago to join her parents in eastern Stephenson County in September 1839. She reported that the coach left Chicago at 2:00 a.m. and stopped at an inn for breakfast at daybreak. With a break for lunch the coach continued on until it arrived in Rockford at dusk. Following a supper of prairie chickens the passengers again boarded the stage at midnight and crossed the Rock River by ferry in the dark. They climbed the sandy riverbank on foot to lighten the load for the horses pulling the coach. In the early dawn they arrived in Stephenson County, and Miss Snow left the coach at her family's log cabin several miles east of Freeport.

Millville, now an empty site along Apple River in Apple River Canyon State Park, was subject to devastating floods and was completely washed away in June 1892.

On 1 April 1854 M.O. Walker's stage stable on Commerce Street in Galena caught fire. The fire eventually burned 32 buildings in the Galena business district.

Completion of the Illinois Central Railroad from Freeport to Galena in 1854, along with the Galena and Chicago Union Railroad between Chicago and Freeport made this stagecoach route obsolete. The Galena and Chicago Union was the first railroad built out from Chicago. The tracks moved westward, reaching Elgin in 1850, Rockford in 1851 and ending in Freeport in 1853. Passengers who formerly took the stagecoach all the way from Chicago to Galena could take the train partway and transfer to the stage for the rest of the trip. The rail line, now Canadian National, parallels the old stage road between Galena and Rockford.

== Stagecoach Stops ==
These stops were active sometime between 1839 and 1854. The stagecoach inns also provided food and lodging to other travelers on the road.

- Chicago, Illinois (Frink, Walker & Company General Stage Office, Lake and Dearborn Streets)
- Oak Park, Illinois (Oak Ridge, Cicero. Joseph and Betty Kettlestrings′ house)
- Maywood, Illinois
- Hillside, Illinois
- Oak Brook, Illinois
- Lisle, Illinois
- Naperville, Illinois (Pre–Emption House)
- Aurora, Illinois
- Elburn, Illinois
- Virgil, Illinois
- Genoa, Illinois (approximately the midpoint of the trail) (Pacific Hotel, Main Street)
- Garden Prairie, Illinois
- Belvidere, Illinois (Belvidere Company hotel)
- Cherry Valley, Illinois
- Rockford, Illinois (Stage barn, Third and State Streets east of the Rock River ferry and ford; Rockford House, State Street; Log Tavern Stage House)
- Twelve–Mile Grove (Vanceborough), Seward Township, Winnebago County, Illinois
- Ridott Township, Stephenson County, Illinois (Thomas Hunt's Tavern)
- Freeport, Illinois (Mansion House, Walnut and Spring Streets)
- Harlem Township, Stephenson County, Illinois (Tisdel Inn)
- Eleroy, Illinois (Stage Inn and barn)
- Lena, Illinois (Buckhorn Inn; Dodd's Inn, Lena Street)
- Waddams Grove, Illinois (Thomas S. French house and barn)
- Nora, Illinois (One Mile House)
- Millville, Illinois (Eldridge Howard Tavern)
- Warren, Illinois (Tisdel Hotel—Warren House—Old Stone Hotel)
- Apple River, Illinois
- Scales Mound, Illinois (Samuel H. Scales′ public house)
- Gratiot's Grove, Lafayette Co. Wisconsin (Fortunatus Berry Tavern)
- Galena, Illinois (Stage stable on Commerce Street)
