= Stagecoach Trail =

Historic route in Illinois, USA

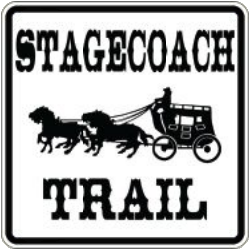
Stagecoach Trail

Route information
- Length: 40 mi (64 km)
- Existed: 1837–present

Major junctions
- East end: Lena, Illinois
- West end: Galena, Illinois

Location
- Country: United States

Highway system
- Scenic route

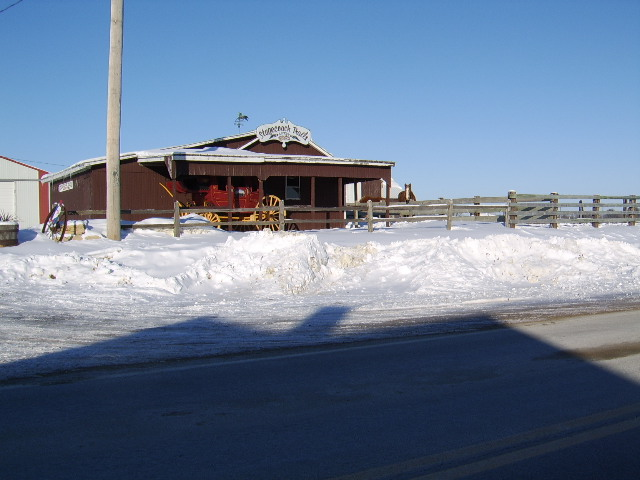
Horsefarm with stagecoach rental on the Stagecoach Trail (the road in the front) in Apple River Township, somewhat west of the village of Apple River (January, 2008)

Stagecoach Trail is a historic route through northern Jo Daviess County and western Stephenson County, in the northwest of Illinois. The trail was a part of the larger Galena–Chicago trail that crossed almost the entire state.

Stagecoach Trail connects Galena and Lena through the communities of Scales Mound, Apple River, Warren and Nora. Stagecoach Trail runs through the third highest point in Illinois, Waddams Hill. It also runs close to the highest point in Illinois, Charles Mound, and the Illinois-Wisconsin border.

The route can be used as an alternative for U.S. Route 20 between Lena and Galena, through picturesque communities and landscapes. Stagecoach rides are offered at several points along the trail. Late 20th century, the communities on the Stagecoach Trail, from Lena through Scales Mound, held an annual Stagecoach Trail Festival in June.

Section and road numbers are:

- County Road 6 in Stephenson County, Illinois, between the U.S. Route 20 and the County Divide Road.
- County Road 13 in Jo Daviess County, Illinois, between the County Divide Road and Central Warren.
- Illinois Route 78 in Central Warren
- County Road 3 in Jo Daviess County, Illinois, between Warren and Galena.

== See also ==
- Old Stagecoach Trail in California
