= Pepoon =

Pepoon is an English surname. Notable people with the surname include:

- Herman Silas Pepoon (1860–1941), American botanist
- Percy Pepoon (1861–1939), American politician
- Steve Pepoon (1956–2025), American television writer
- Theodore Pepoon (1836–1910), American politician and publisher
