= Scales Mound =

Scales Mound is a village and a township in Jo Daviess County, Illinois, in the United States:

- Scales Mound, Illinois
- Scales Mound Township, Jo Daviess County, Illinois
