= Rush Township, Illinois =

Rush Township
- Township
- Location in Jo Daviess County

- Jo Daviess County's location in Illinois
- Coordinates: 42°24′40″N 90°02′20″W
- Country: United States
- State: Illinois
- County: Jo Daviess
- Established: November 2, 1852

Government
  - Supervisor: Janice Toay

Area
  - Total: 36.77 sq mi (95.2 km^{2})
  - Land: 36.77 sq mi (95.2 km^{2})
  - Water: 0 sq mi (0 km^{2}) 0%
- Elevation: 981 ft (299 m)
- Highest elevation: 1,204 ft (367 m)

Population (2020)
  - Total: 359
  - Density: 9.76/sq mi (3.77/km^{2})
- Time zone: UTC-6 (CST)
  - Summer (DST): UTC-5 (CDT)
- ZIP codes: 61001, 61085, 61087
- FIPS code: 17-085-66326

Rush Township is one of 23 townships in Jo Daviess County, Illinois, United States. As of the 2020 census, its population was 359 and it contained 180 housing units.

== Geography ==
According to the 2021 census gazetteer files, Rush Township has a total area of 36.77 square miles (95.23 km^{2}), all land.

Benton Mound is located in Rush township, and is the second highest peak in Illinois, at 1,204 feet (367 m).

=== Cemeteries ===
The township contains four cemeteries:

- Millville
- Oakland (also known as Puckett)
- Townsend
- Robinson

=== Landmarks ===
- Apple River Canyon State Park
- Millville Ghost Town (in Apple River Canyon State Park)

== Demographics ==
As of the 2020 census there were 359 people, 140 households, and 113 families residing in the township. The population density was 9.76 inhabitants per square mile (3.77/km^{2}). There were 180 housing units at an average density of 4.90 per square mile (1.89/km^{2}). The racial makeup of the township was 98.61% White, 0.00% African American, 0.00% Native American, 0.00% Asian, 0.00% Pacific Islander, 0.00% from other races, and 1.39% from two or more races. Hispanic or Latino people of any race were 2.23% of the population.

There were 140 households, out of which 55.00% had children under the age of 18 living with them, 75.00% were married couples living together, 5.71% had a female householder with no spouse present, and 19.29% were non-families. 19.30% of all households were made up of individuals, and 15.00% had someone living alone who was 65 years of age or older. The average household size was 2.89 and the average family size was 3.35.

The township's age distribution consisted of 34.1% under the age of 18, 6.7% from 18 to 24, 35.8% from 25 to 44, 14.1% from 45 to 64, and 9.4% who were 65 years of age or older. The median age was 33.1 years. For every 100 females, there were 128.8 males. For every 100 females age 18 and over, there were 151.9 males.

The median income for a household in the township was $54,259, and the median income for a family was $54,926. Males had a median income of $36,827 versus $19,130 for females. The per capita income for the township was $22,132. None of the population was below the poverty line.

Historical population
Census	Pop.	Note	%±
2000	462		—
2010	380		−17.7%
2020	359		−5.5%
U.S. Decennial Census

== School districts ==
- Stockton Community Unit School District 206
- Warren Community Unit School District 205

== Political districts ==
- Illinois' 16th congressional district
- State House District 89
- State Senate District 45
