= Senator Pepoon =

Senator Pepoon may refer to:

- Percy Pepoon (1861–1939), Missouri State Senate
- Theodore Pepoon (1836–1910), Nebraska State Senate
