= Scales Mound Historic District =

Historic district in Illinois, United States

- U.S. National Register of Historic Places
- U.S. Historic district
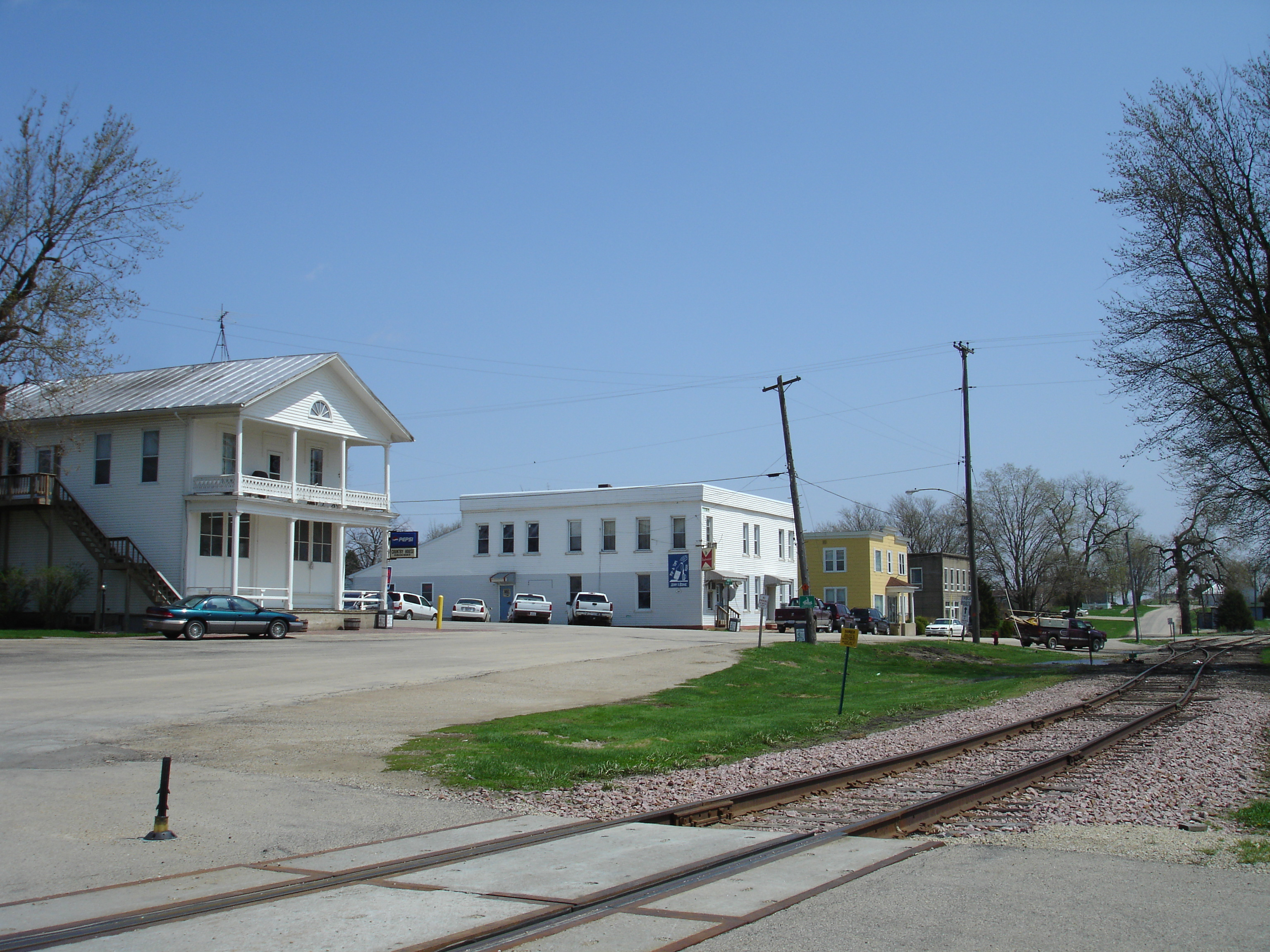
- A view of North Railroad Street, including the William Allan Store

- Location within Illinois Location within the United States
- Location: Roughly bounded by village corporate limits, Scales Mound, Illinois
- Coordinates: 42°28′55″N 90°15′10″W
- Area: 96 acres (39 ha)
- Built: various
- Architect: various builders
- Architectural style: Vernacular, Queen Anne
- NRHP reference No.: 90001199
- Added to NRHP: September 5, 1990

The Scales Mound Historic District is a historic district in the small Illinois village of Scales Mound. The district encompasses the entire corporate limit of the village and has more than 200 properties within its boundaries. The district was added to the U.S. National Register of Historic Places in 1990.

== History and boundaries ==
Scales Mound has always been a small, agricultural community and development of the village and the buildings in the historic district was closely tied to the arrival of the railroad. Most of the few commercial businesses in Scales Mound were concentrated around the railroad right-of-way. The Scales Mound Historic District is roughly bounded by the corporate limits of the village itself. The district includes the original 1854 limits of the village plus three additions to the village that were platted later.

== Properties ==
=== General ===
Properties within the historic district include residential, commercial, civic, and a few industrial buildings. There is also one structure, a fire siren, that is considered a contributing resource to the district. There is a total of 290 properties within the boundaries of the Scales Mound Historic District; 185 of those are considered historic, and thus, contributing properties.

Of those properties considered part of the district there are 89 houses, 52 garages, two barns, 15 commercial buildings, eight wash houses/sheds, seven churches, four privies. Only outbuildings of special interest were included in the district, others were ignored.

=== Non-contributing ===
The 105 non-contributing buildings include, 57 houses, 25 garages, 20 commercial buildings, three civic buildings and one apartment building. Some of the non-contributing buildings are 19th-century structures that have lost their integrity due to alterations. Some of these would be contributing if alterations, such as siding, were removed. Most of the non-contributing buildings in Scales Mound are less than 50 years old.

== Specific historic properties ==
=== Allan Warehouse ===
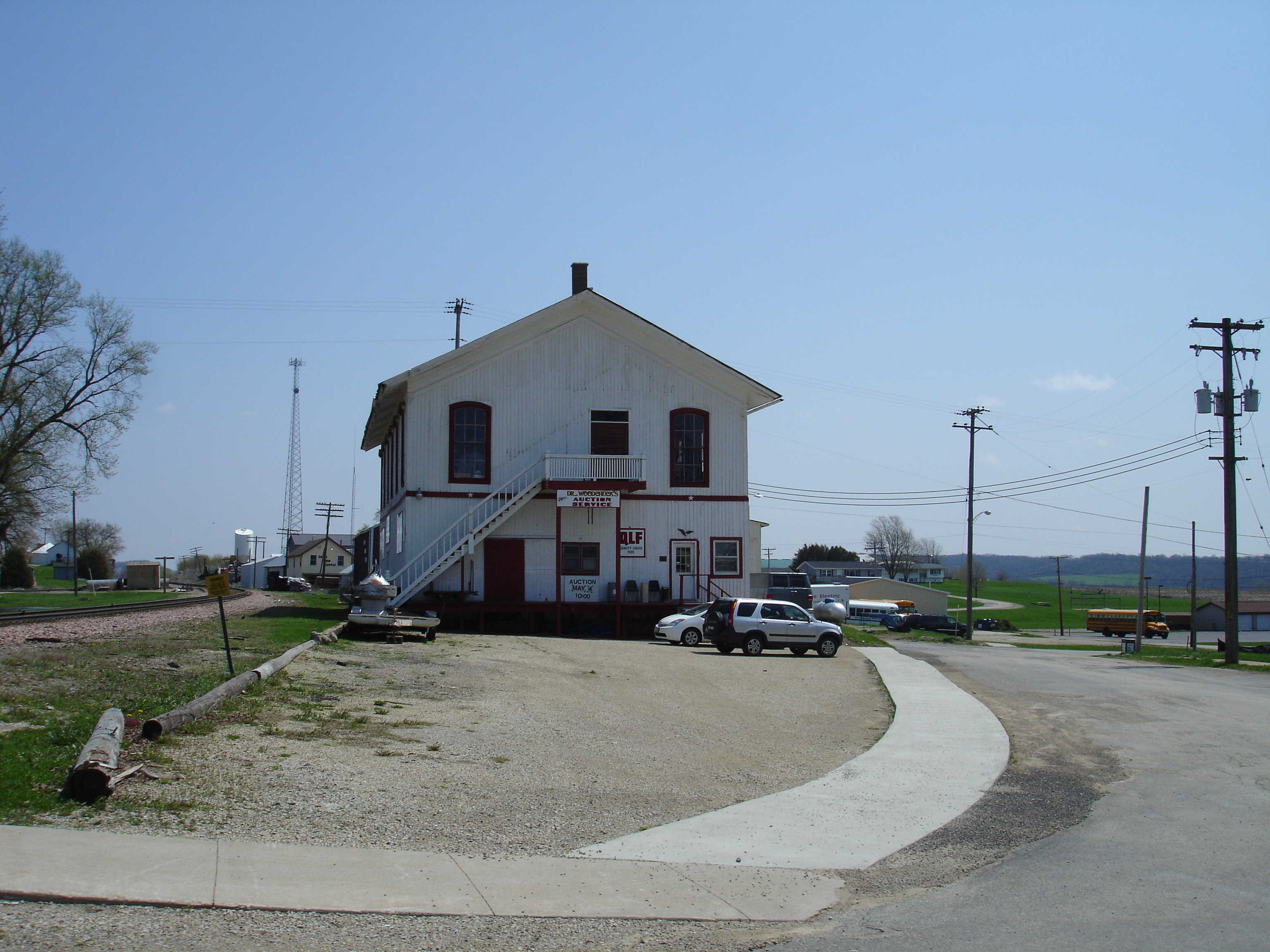
C. 1864 Allan Warehouse

The Allan Warehouse is located near the railroad tracks and is a wood-framed two-story building with board and batten siding. The warehouse sits on a stone pier foundation and has large double hung sash windows with curved window hoods. It was constructed around 1864.

=== Commercial buildings ===
Scales Mound has always been, largely, an agricultural community. What little industry that did spring up in town has been concentrated on the railroad tracks' south side. The more upscale commercial enterprises were always located along North Railroad Street. Through the years Scales Mound has been home to such businesses as: grain and produce warehouses, stock yards, lumber yards, a creamery, three hotels and a bank.

=== Churches ===
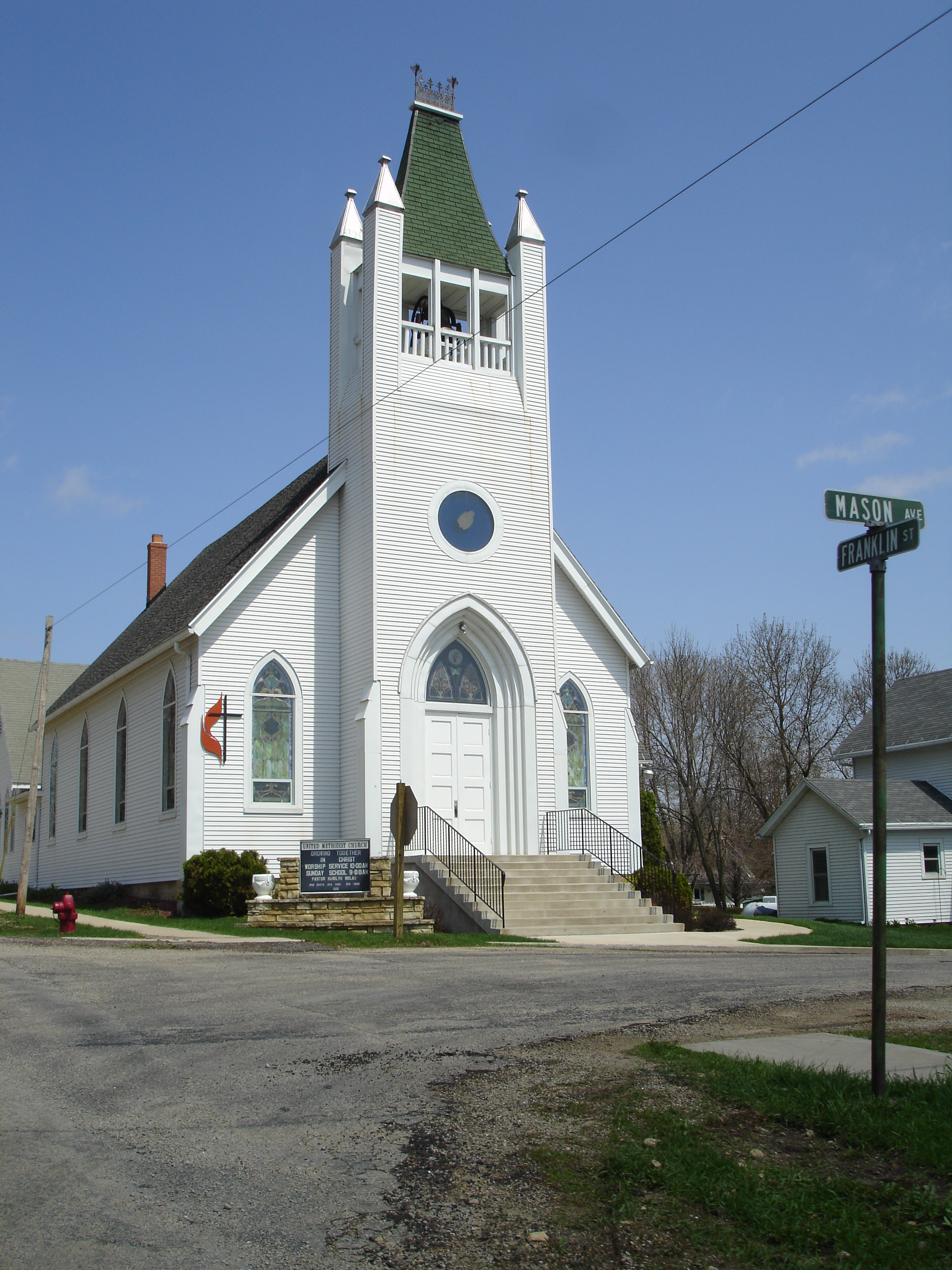
The 1883 United Methodist Church

The 1883 United Methodist Church is built in rectangular plan and has a large spire on its front elevation. The building has a stone foundation and an attached parsonage. The windows are a Gothic style and feature stained glass. Scales Mound Holy Trinity Catholic Church has had two additions, the first altered the front facade c. 1915 and the second was a large rear addition in c. 1970. The building, a contributing property despite its alterations, is a gable-front design with a side tower. The church is of brick construction and has stained glass windows with curved window hoods. The First Presbyterian church is another example of a gable-front church in Scales Mound. It was built between 1875–90 and features an offset tower. Its foundation is of stone and rusticated block. It has Gothic style stained glass windows and was added onto the rear one time.

=== Residential ===
The majority of the houses in Scales Mound were constructed between 1880 and 1925 and most are painted white. The houses are mostly moderated-sized, one and one half to two story homes with spacious yards. Some houses have common alterations, which include the addition of shed dormers and various types of siding. Very few houses built after 1930 are present within the historic district, there are some but they are mostly concentrated in clusters.

=== Public Square ===
The Public Square is a city park that houses a pavilion and the village hall. It is located in the heart of the village's residential district. The Scales Mound Village Hall was built around 1875–90. It has a false front design and stands one and one half stories tall. It sits on a stone and concrete foundation and has an early-20th-century addition at the rear. The Scales Mound Village Hall is now available to rent for events.

Also in the public square is one of Scales Mounds' many outbuildings. A gable roof shed within the park was declared neither contributing or non for the purpose of the historic district. The park has a pavilion/bandstand that was erected between c. 1900–25. It is of steel-frame construction, has a pyramidal roof and a concrete pier foundation. The pavilion was declared a contributing property to the district.

=== Outbuildings ===
There are a large number of extant, original outbuildings associated with the various houses in Scales Mound. Gable and hip roof garages are commonly found in the village. In addition there are several extant carriage houses and stables, privies, and barns still standing around town. The architectural survey undertaken in 1989 concurrent with the National Register nomination noted dozens of such outbuildings. Even then, there were a large number of outbuildings that were declared neither contributing or non-contributing properties and simply not documented.

=== Rail Corridor ===
Along the railroad tracks through Scales Mound are five properties, four of them historic in nature. There are two shed/pump houses, both dating from c. 1910–40. One is a gable roof building with a concrete foundation and the other has a flat roof and metal siding. A rectangular feed warehouse dating from c. 1915–20 is also located along the rail corridor. The one story, gable roof feed warehouse stands on a concrete pier foundation. A pyramidal roof garage/warehouse, built c. 1915–25, stands on concrete foundations near the tracks as well. Associated with the garage are bulk oil storage tanks and a pump shed constructed by Trachte Brothers Company of Madison, Wisconsin. The only one of the five buildings not considered contributing to the district is a c. 1949–50 rail loading platform of pole construction.

=== William Allan House ===
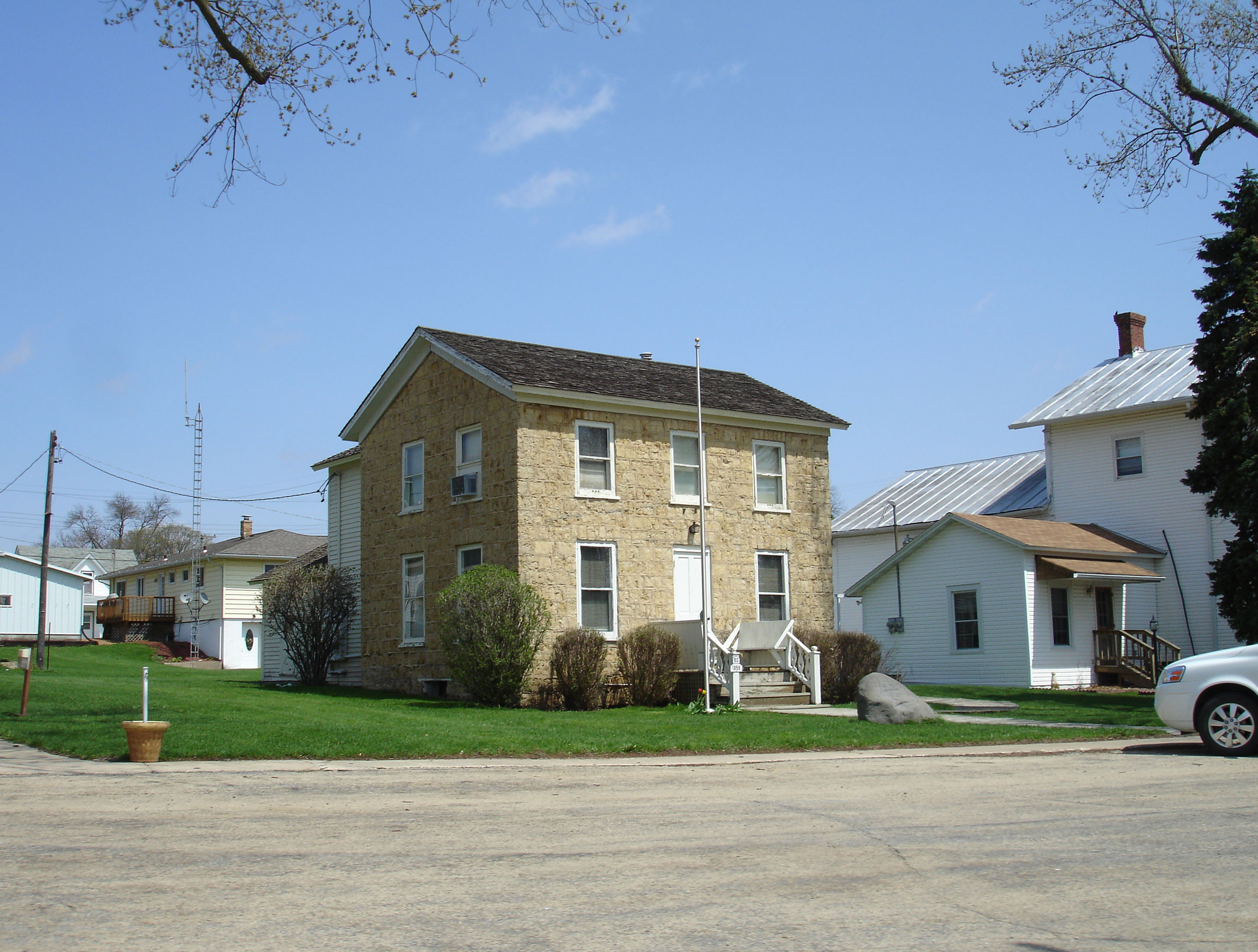
C. 1859 William Allan House

The William Allan House is located along North Railroad Street in the middle of the central business district in Scales Mound. The Allan House is an I-house of stone construction, built upon a stone foundation around 1859. The two-story house has a rear addition and features double hung sash windows.

=== William Allan Store ===
The William Allan Store has long been one of the focuses of the Scales Mound central business district. It is located along North Railroad Street immediately adjacent the railroad tracks that pass through the village. The Allan Store stands next to the Allan House and is a two-story gable-front structure. Wood-framed, like nearly all buildings in Scales Mound, the store is fronted by a two-story porch with a pedimented roof. There is a fanlight in the gable front and a one-story addition to the side of the structure. The William Allan Store was built around 1859.

== Architecture ==
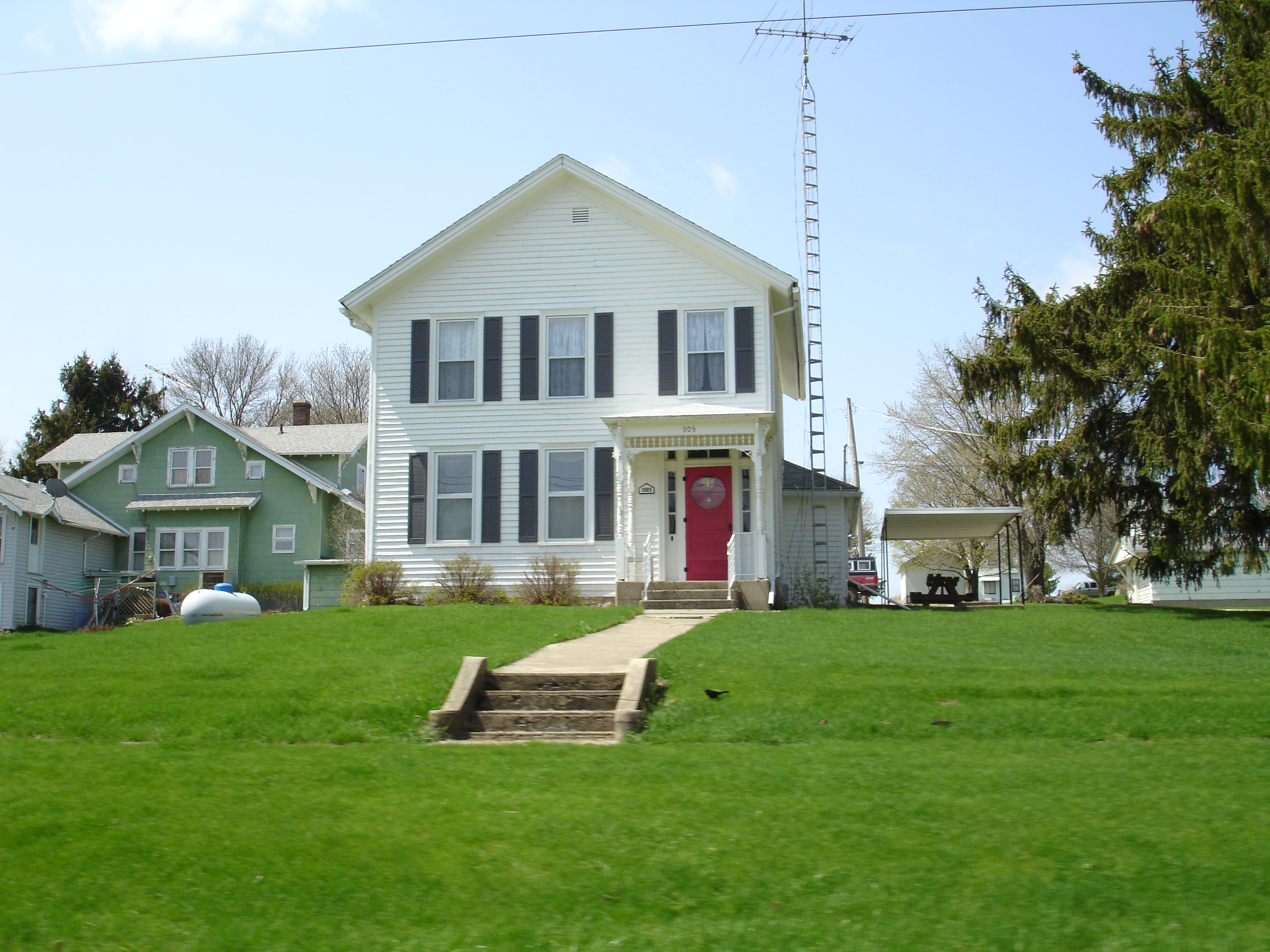
The c. 1880 William Atkinson House, an example of a gable-front design

Most of the residential architecture in Scales Mound is of traditional 19th-century forms: I-house, gable-front, cottages or T- and L-shaped plans. Homes from the early 20th century also adhere to traditional forms with American Foursquare style being prevalent. None of the houses in Scales Mound appear to be architect-designed and generally contain scaled down elements of Stick style, Eastlake and Queen Anne styles, often on the same house. The most ornamented and architecturally impressive houses are found on North Main Street and are classified as Queen Anne style.

Concrete construction is prevalent among the homes and buildings in Scales Mound. Adam Rittweger constructed numerous distinctive concrete porches, garages, and foundations between 1908 and his death in 1933. There are several surviving examples of poured concrete constructed buildings in Scales Mound including the 1923 one story electrical generating plant, and Lewis Richard's 1911 restaurant. There is one surviving example in Scales Mound of a stucco clad and poured concrete construction combination, Louis Durrstein's implement dealership. It is presumed that Rittweger also introduced stucco finishes to Scales Mound between the late 1900s and early 1910s.

== Historic significance ==
The district is interesting because of the large number of wood-framed outbuildings still remaining from the district's main period of significance (1855–1930). The district is also significant for the large number of mid-19th-century vernacular homes and commercial buildings which remain intact and retain a large amount of their architectural integrity. The buildings contribute to the understanding of the agricultural, social, and commercial history of late-19th-century and early-20th-century northern Illinois. Together the structures and their lots convey the feeling of a small and active pre-Great Depression farming community. The Scales Mound Historic District was added to the National Register of Historic Places on September 5, 1990.

== See also ==
- Charles Mound
- Scales Mound Township
