= Nora Township, Illinois =

Nora Township
- Township
- Location in Jo Daviess County

- Jo Daviess County's location in Illinois
- Coordinates: 42°26′08″N 89°57′22″W
- Country: United States
- State: Illinois
- County: Jo Daviess
- Established: November 2, 1852

Government
  - Supervisor: Donna P. Paige

Area
  - Total: 25.35 sq mi (65.7 km^{2})
  - Land: 25.35 sq mi (65.7 km^{2})
  - Water: 0 sq mi (0 km^{2}) 0%
- Elevation: 981 ft (299 m)

Population (2020)
  - Total: 344
  - Density: 13.6/sq mi (5.24/km^{2})
- Time zone: UTC-6 (CST)
  - Summer (DST): UTC-5 (CDT)
- ZIP codes: 61048, 61059, 61085, 61087, 61089
- FIPS code: 17-085-53208

Nora Township is one of 23 townships in Jo Daviess County, Illinois, United States. As of the 2020 census, its population was 344 and it contained 151 housing units.

== Geography ==
According to the 2021 census gazetteer files, Nora Township has a total area of 25.35 square miles (65.66 km^{2}), all land.

=== Cities, towns, villages ===
- Nora

=== Cemeteries ===
The township contains three cemeteries:

- East Chelsea
- West Chelsea
- Nora

=== Major highways ===
- Illinois Route 78

== Demographics ==
As of the 2020 census there were 344 people, 181 households, and 114 families residing in the township. The population density was 13.57 inhabitants per square mile (5.24/km^{2}). There were 151 housing units at an average density of 5.96 per square mile (2.30/km^{2}). The racial makeup of the township was 95.93% White, 0.00% African American, 0.00% Native American, 0.00% Asian, 0.00% Pacific Islander, 0.87% from other races, and 3.20% from two or more races. Hispanic or Latino people of any race were 2.62% of the population.

There were 181 households, out of which 32.60% had children under the age of 18 living with them, 55.25% were married couples living together, 1.66% had a female householder with no spouse present, and 37.02% were non-families. 9.90% of all households were made up of individuals, and 5.50% had someone living alone who was 65 years of age or older. The average household size was 2.37 and the average family size was 2.90.

The township's age distribution consisted of 27.0% under the age of 18, 13.8% from 18 to 24, 22.8% from 25 to 44, 24.5% from 45 to 64, and 11.9% who were 65 years of age or older. The median age was 32.1 years. For every 100 females, there were 142.4 males. For every 100 females age 18 and over, there were 148.4 males.

The median income for a household in the township was $65,089, and the median income for a family was $71,250. Males had a median income of $28,125 versus $38,487 for females. The per capita income for the township was $25,189. About 2.6% of families and 2.8% of the population were below the poverty line, including none of those under age 18 and 3.9% of those age 65 or over.

Historical population
Census	Pop.	Note	%±
2000	404		—
2010	370		−8.4%
2020	344		−7.0%
U.S. Decennial Census

== School districts ==
- Lena Winslow Community Unit School District 202
- Stockton Community Unit School District 206
- Warren Community Unit School District 205

== Political districts ==
- Illinois' 16th congressional district
- State House District 89
- State Senate District 45
