= Terrence Ingram =

American author and activist

Terrence Neale Ingram was an American author and activist, who lived in Apple River, Illinois.

He is best known for his books on the bald eagle, the Eagle Nature Foundation, and his work in rebuilding the bald eagle population to remove it from the threatened species lists.

He was also active as a bee keeper, apiary instructor and bee researcher, as well as a columnist with the American Bee Journal.

== Life and Education ==
Terrence Ingram was born in Shullsburg, Wisconsin on November 21st, 1939. Growing up, Ingram lived on his family's dairy farm in Apple River, where he would spend nearly every Sunday afternoon birdwatching in the woods. Ingram graduated from the University of Wisconsin–Platteville in 1961 with degrees in mathematics and physics, and a minor in biology. In 1981, Ingram married Nancy Laun. He passed away on May 18, 2025 at the age of 85.

== Eagles ==
Ingram volunteered as an amateur bird bander for the United States Fish and Wildlife Service for over fifty years, beginning in college. His widespread interest in birds, particularly bald eagles, led him to found the Eagle Nature Foundation in 1995, which he served as president and executive director for. He and the foundation are credited as a large influence in removing the bald eagle from the American endangered species list. Ingrams efforts are believed to have saved roughly 10,000 acres of bald eagle habitat in the midwest.

For his accomplishments, he was awarded the Albert Nelson Marquis Lifetime Achievement Award in 2018.

His book, Eagle (ISBN 9781567995589), which he wrote, edited, and shot the photography for, was published by Metro Books in 1998. He also published numerous articles on the recovery of the bald eagle population.

== Bees ==
Ingram did research on the effects of Monsanto's herbicide, Roundup, as a proposed cause of colony collapse disorder in honey bees.

In March 2012, his bees were seized by the Illinois Department of Agriculture, with a claim that they were infected by American foulbrood. The hives were destroyed prior to the hearing, and therefore he could not present evidence of infection, or lack of infection of his hives. He has asserted that his 15 years of research regarding the effects of a herbicide on bees was the cause of the seizure.
