= Herman Silas Pepoon =

American physician

Herman Silas Pepoon (1860–1941), often known simply as H.S. Pepoon, was a prominent early botanist in the Chicago region. His 1927 Annotated Flora of the Chicago Region remains a classic of Chicago botany.

== Early life and education ==
Born in Warren, Illinois on January 21, 1860, Pepoon was the son of George and Mary Pepoon, and nephew of Nebraska politician Theodore Pepoon. He received his BS from the University of Illinois at Urbana–Champaign in 1881, where his thesis was on "The flora of upper Michigan". He went on to study medicine and received an MD in 1883 from Hahnemann Medical College of Chicago.

On April 25, 1883, he married Alma Marie Wilcox. She died in 1893, and he remarried seven years later to Helen Sophia Foberg.

== Career ==
After receiving his MD, Pepoon initially practiced medicine, in Nebraska and in Lewistown, Illinois. In 1892, however, he changed careers, choosing instead to teach at Chicago's Lake View High School, where he became head instructor for botany and agriculture. Over the course of his time there, from 1892 to 1930, he taught more than 10,000 students. He was also instrumental in the creation of Apple River Canyon State Park.

== Books ==
- Studies of Plant Life (1900)
- Representative Plants (1912)
- An Annotated Flora of the Chicago Region (1927)
- Essays on ecology 1904-1933 (published 2011)

== See also ==
- Henry Chandler Cowles

== Sources ==
- Greenberg, Joel (2010). Of Prairie, Woods, and Water: Two Centuries of Chicago Nature Writing. University of Chicago Press.
- Swink, Floyd; Wilhelm, Gerould (1994). Plants of the Chicago region. Indiana Academy of Science. ISBN 1-883362-01-6.
