= Old Stone Hotel =

- Old Stone hotel
- U.S. National Register of Historic Places
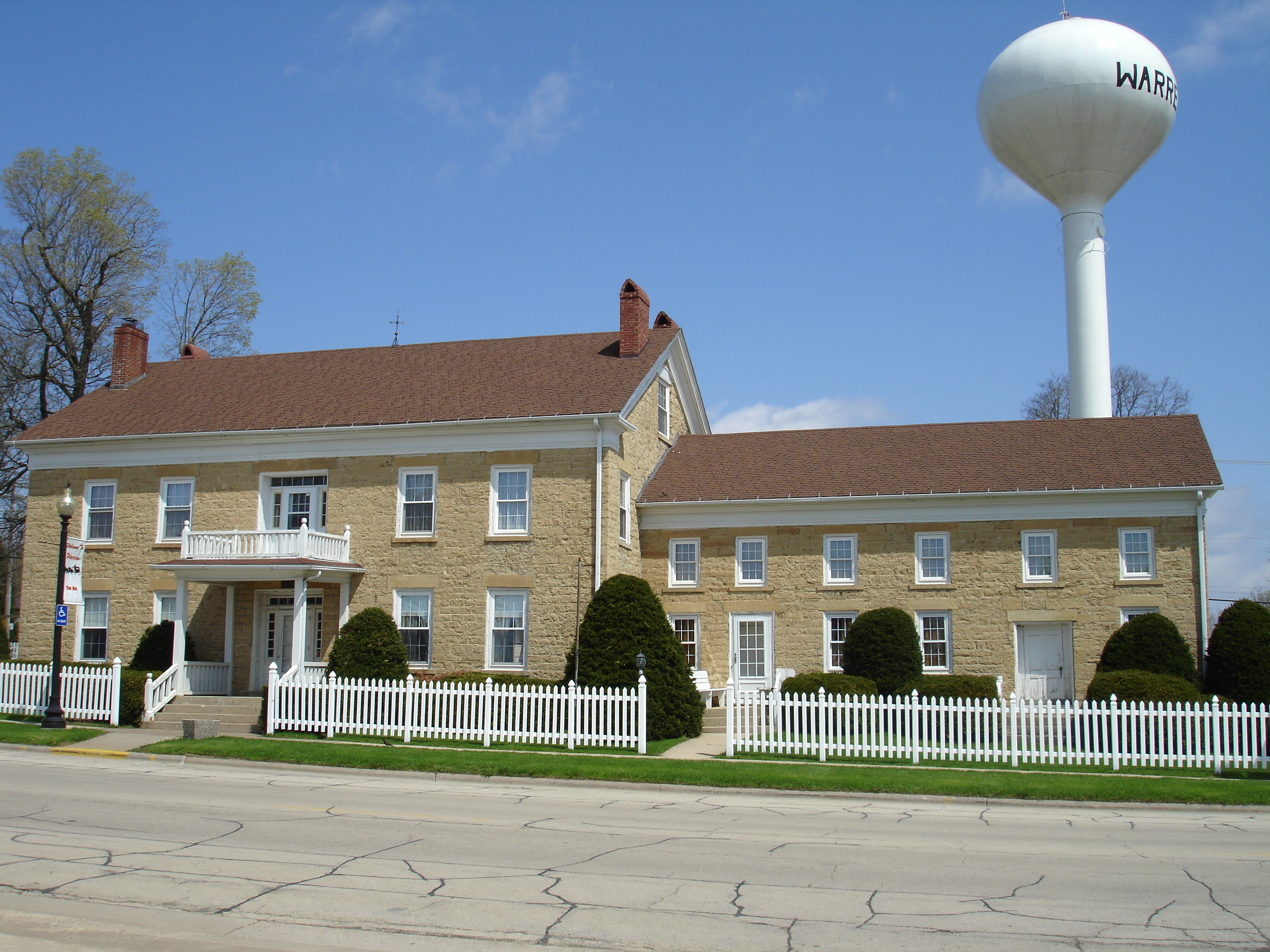

- Location within Illinois Location within the United States
- Location: 110 W. Main St., Warren, Illinois
- Coordinates: 42°29′50″N 89°59′28″W
- Area: 1 acre (0.40 ha)
- Built: 1851
- Architect: F. Tisdall (builder)
- Architectural style: early Georgian style/Federal style
- NRHP reference No.: 75000665
- Added to NRHP: April 16, 1975

The Old Stone Hotel, also known as the Warren Community Building or Warren House Hotel, was constructed in 1851 as a stagecoach station. It was located closely to the crossing of two stagecoach routes near the Illinois-Wisconsin border in the village of Warren, Illinois, United States. The building was added to the U.S. National Register of Historic Places in 1975.

== History ==
The Old Stone Hotel, or Warren House Hotel, was built as a stagecoach station in 1851 by F. Tisdall. The current building maintains its historic appearance down to the white picket fence surrounding the structure. When the building was constructed two stagecoach trails crossed near Warren. The Chicago-Galena Trail and the Sucker Trail, which went from St. Louis to the lead smelting operations in Wiota, Wisconsin.

== Architecture ==
The Old Stone Hotel was built in the early Georgian style and constructed from block limestone; the building's exterior remains unaltered from its original form and appearance. The east wing of the first floor was altered into a large ballroom but much of the rest of the first floor remains unaltered. Upstairs, is the building caretaker's apartment, which served as the station owner's apartment when the building was used as a stagecoach stop. The former third floor ballroom serves a similar purpose as offices for village administration.

== Historic significance ==
The hotel was a stop along the crossing of two major stagecoach routes and hosted prominent visitors such as Ulysses S. Grant, a resident of nearby Galena, on multiple occasions. The building was restored and used as the Warren Community Building in recent years. On April 16, 1975 the U.S. National Register of Historic Places and its Keeper of the Register approved the listing of the Old Stone Hotel.
