= Millville, Illinois =

Archaeological site in Illinois, United States

- Millville Town Site
- U.S. National Register of Historic Places
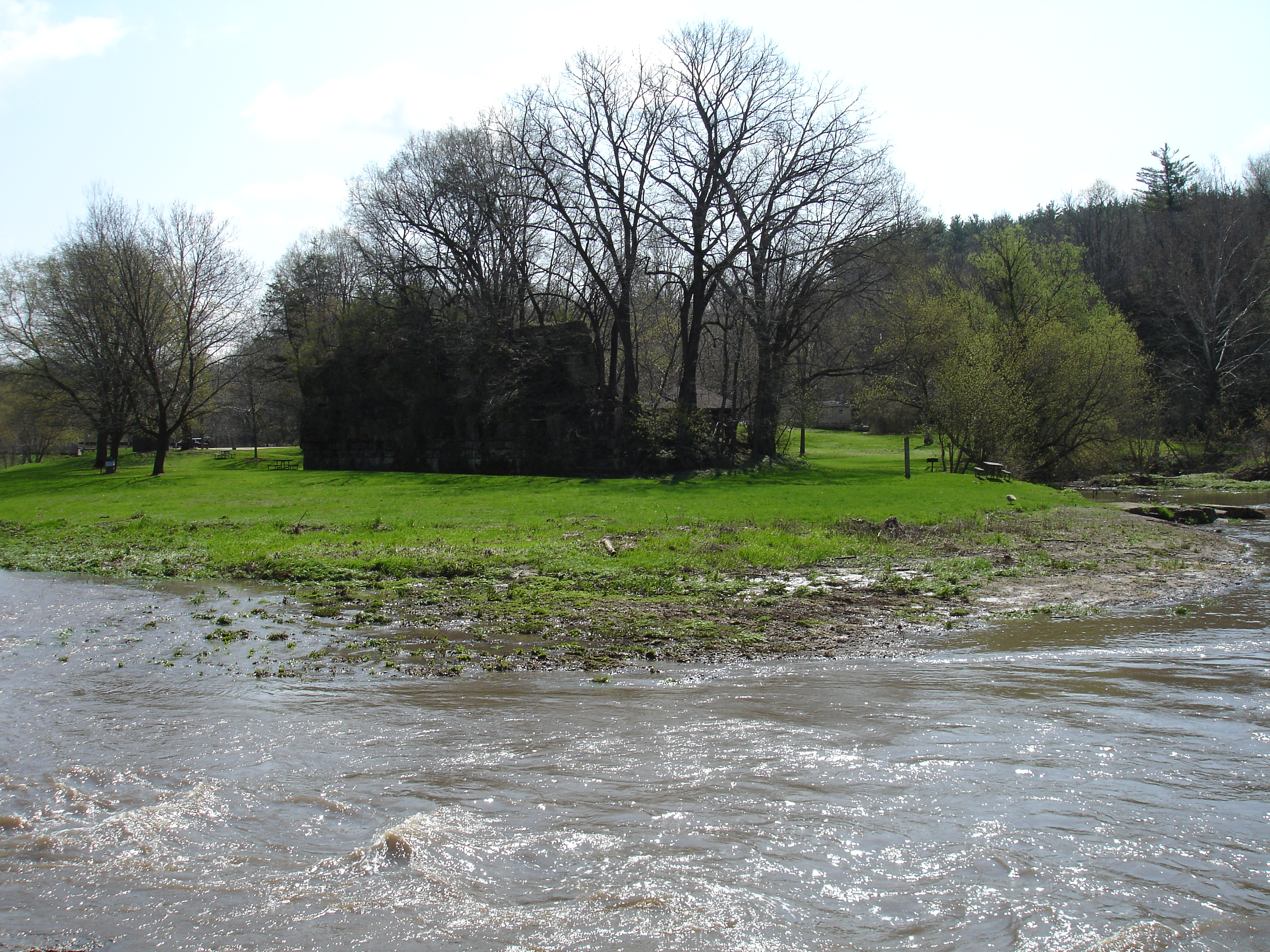
- Millville was located at the confluence of the Apple River and the South Fork Apple River.
- Location: Apple River, Rush Township, Jo Daviess County, Illinois
- Coordinates: 42°26′56″N 90°03′05″W
- Area: 25 acres (10 ha)
- Built: 1835
- NRHP reference No.: 03000066
- Added to NRHP: March 3, 2003

Millville is a defunct settlement in Jo Daviess County, Illinois, United States, located within the boundaries of Apple River Canyon State Park. Founded in 1835 and platted in 1846, the community was washed away completely by a flood in 1892. No visible remnants of its structures remain today. The site of Millville was added to the U.S. National Register of Historic Places as the Millville Town Site in 2003.

== Location ==
Millville was located in what is today the Apple River Canyon State Park; its physical address is within the village of Apple River. The canyon is a deep gorge carved by the Apple River when its course was diverted during the Illinoian Stage, 132,000–300,000 years ago. The old river channel eventually filled and became the South Fork Apple River. Millville was located at the confluence of these two rivers; the site is marked by a large rock formation and two plaques.

== History ==
Millville was initially established in 1835 along the northern Chicago-Galena stagecoach route, a roadway today known as the Stagecoach Trail. John R. Smith and the Burbridge family were responsible for the village's first buildings and a saw mill was erected between 1835–36. It developed as an important rural service stop along that stagecoach route. Millville was significant in the early history of Jo Daviess County, serving as a civic and commercial hub from 1838–53. According to 1878's The History of Jo Daviess County, Illinois, the town itself was platted on April 14, 1846, within Rush Township by John R. Smith.

Millville faced decline after the railroads entered Jo Daviess County during the 1850s. Still, the town served as a minor commercial center for several decades after. In 1853–54 the Illinois Central Railroad bypassed Millville relegating it to a future as a "backwater town". Despite this, two prominent commercial operations remained in business into the late 19th century, the grist mill and a blacksmith shop. The blacksmith shop, eight buildings, two homes and a school are shown in town maps as late as 1872.

The town's fate was sealed by a June 1892 flood which reportedly swept away all of the town's remaining buildings, leaving no trace of Millville in its wake. Heavy rains swelled the pond at the Cox Mill, ¼ mile from Millville, causing the mill dam to burst. The mill pond waters tore down Clear Creek and poured into the South Fork Apple River, rushing toward Millville. The town's buildings, unable to withstand the deluge, were swept away by the violent river.

== Demographics and cityscape ==
By 1847 a large grist mill was constructed in the town, replacing the earlier saw mill. Other businesses were established in what had become a thriving wayside stop with the stagecoach line running directly through it. A Mr. Dean owned a blacksmith shop, a John W. Marshall started a dry goods store, another resident, Eldridge Howard built a large house and opened a tavern within it. At its height, Millville was the only settlement of significance between Freeport and Galena.

The most concentrated part of town was laid out on the flood plain at the rivers' confluence, other structures were built along the bluffs flanking the river. Millville covered 25 acres (100,000 m^{2}) and consisted of about 10 blocks, approximately laid out in a north–south grid. 1840 census figures show a population of 62, though local historians have given estimates for the late 1830s at 330, a number that likely included surrounding rural farms.

The 1850 census provides little illumination about the number of people in Millville. Through the census information, however, 27 households can be derived, as well as the place of origin for many of those heads of households as well as their occupations. Settlers in Millville originated in 11 different states with Kentucky and New York being the most common, only three were native Illinoisians, and one was foreign-born. Of the 1850 population of Millville, 19 people were engaged in commercial or trade occupation, 17 were farmers or laborers and at least 6 were involved in lead mining.

== Archaeological investigation ==
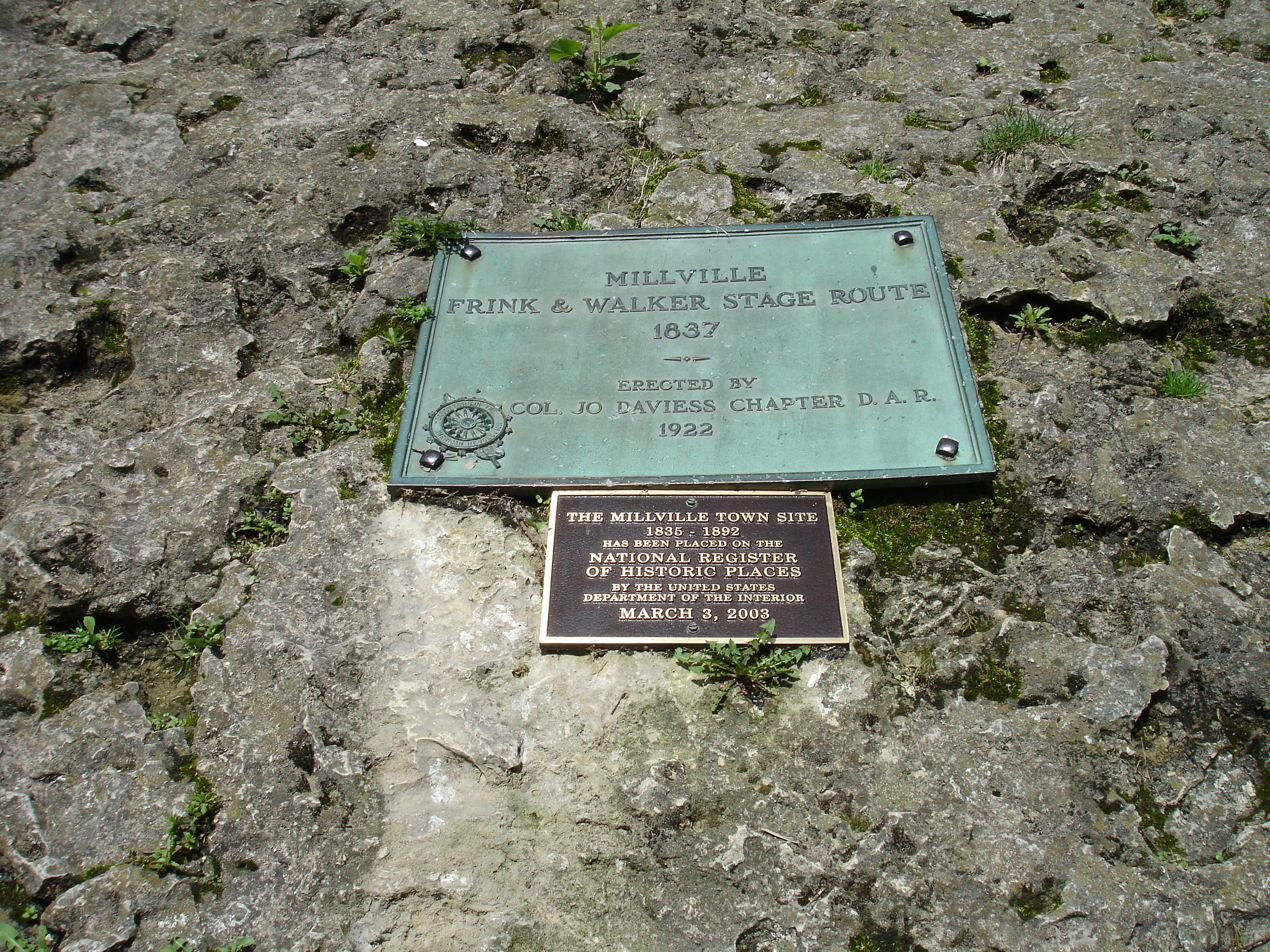
The Milleville Town Site is marked by two plaques.

Multiple archaeological surveys have taken place at the Millville site. One such survey occurred when the Illinois Department of Transportation (IDOT) prepared to replace an old bridge across the South Fork Apple River within the state park. An archaeological team, from the Resource Investigation Program at the University of Illinois, reported a buried layer of top soil about 70–80 cm beneath the surface with extensive 19th century ceramics and mortar as well as an area of stone that may have been part of a building foundation. The team determined that the building of the bridge would disturb the site and recommended further survey, no other work was done at the right-of-way, and IDOT approved the project in December 1991.

Today, the site is open to the public and marked by a plaque; visitors to Apple River Canyon are allowed to walk about the site and even picnic. However, metal detectors and artifact removal are not allowed, and the town site is protected by state and federal law.

== Significance ==
Millville was an important town along the stagecoach route from Chicago to Galena, and played an important early role in the history of Jo Daviess County. The town site is an archaeologically important site that surveys have shown to be in good condition. Artifact recovery at the site in the future has the potential to yield new information about the day-to-day habits of those living in Millville. For these reasons, the Millville Town Site was added to the National Register of Historic Places on March 3, 2003.

== See also ==
- Ghost town
