= Falls City Journal =

Newspaper in Falls City, Nebraska

- Type: Weekly newspaper
- Owner(s): Richard L. Halbert
- Founded: 1868
- City: Falls City, Nebraska
- Website: fcjournal.net

The Falls City Journal is a newspaper serving Falls City, Nebraska and nearby communities.

== History ==
The Journal began as the Nemaha Valley Journal in 1868. It replaced an earlier newspaper known as the Broadaxe. It changed its name to the Falls City Globe-Journal in 1875, after merging with the Falls City Little Globe, and adopted its current name ("Falls City Journal") in 1882. By this point, it was a daily newspaper, and remained so throughout much of the 20th century. However, it changed from a daily newspaper to a semiweekly newspaper in 1994, and launched a web edition in 2010.

Early publishers of the Journal included former Nebraska state senator Theodore Pepoon, who owned and operated the paper from 1881 to 1885. Under Pepoon, the paper was known for its promotion of Radical Republican politics.

The Falls City Journal was sold to Richard L. Halbert on September 1, 2017.
