= Angela Rose Canfield =

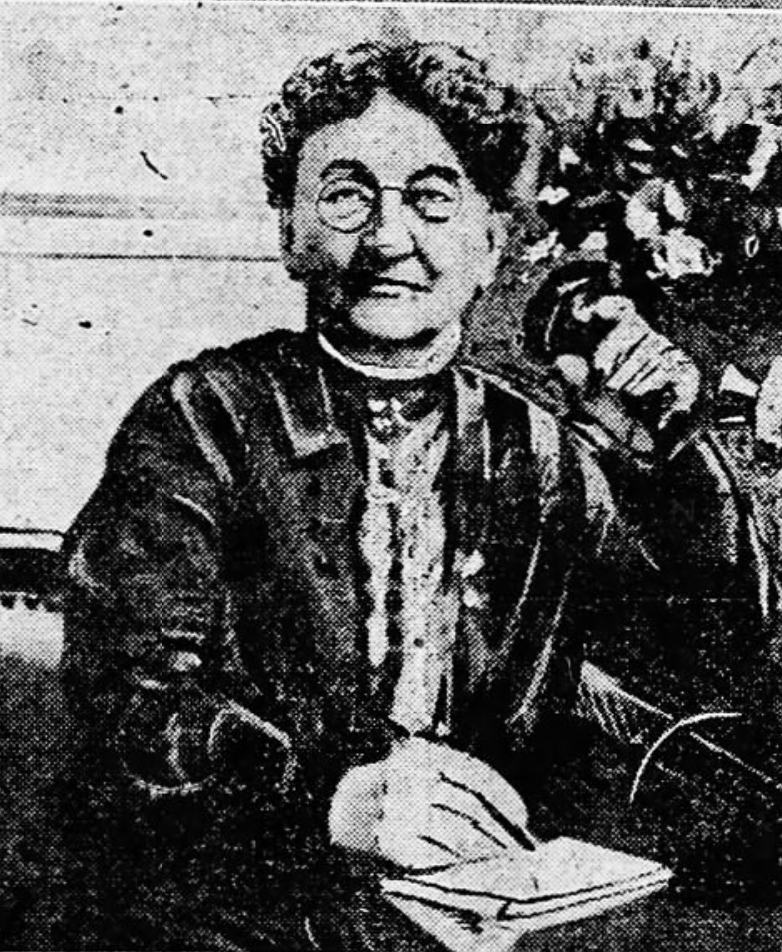
- Angela Rose Canfield after being elected mayor.
- Born: 1840; New York
- Died: August 23, 1925; McMinnville, Oregon
- Known for: First female mayor in Illinois

Angela Rose Canfield (1840 – August 23, 1925) was a politician, activist, and milliner in Illinois. In 1915, she was elected mayor of Warren, making her the first female mayor of the town as well as the first woman elected as a mayor statewide.

== Biography ==
Angela Rose Canfield was born in 1840 in New York State. Around the 1860s, she married O.J. Hildreth; she later remarried.

During the Civil War, she served as superintendent of the U.S. Army messhouse in Nashville. She then worked as a Pinkerton private police officer and combatted the Molly Maguires in Pennsylvania in the late 1800s.

Around 1881, Canfield settled in Warren, Illinois, where she became active in the statewide women's suffrage movement. She was also affiliated with the Woman's Christian Temperance Union and various other women's activism organizations. In the early 1890s, she established a milliner's shop in the town.

In April 1915, Canfield was elected mayor of Warren, Illinois. She defeated two other candidates by a plurality of four votes. On her election, at age 75, she became the first woman mayor in the town as well as across the entire state of Illinois.

Canfield took office on May 1 of that year and served a two-year term. She vowed to punish "boodlers and grafters," as well as law enforcement officers who didn't pull their weight. She stepped down after finishing her term in 1917.

Canfield died on August 23, 1925, in McMinnville, Oregon.
