= Apple River Township, Illinois =

Apple River Township
- Township
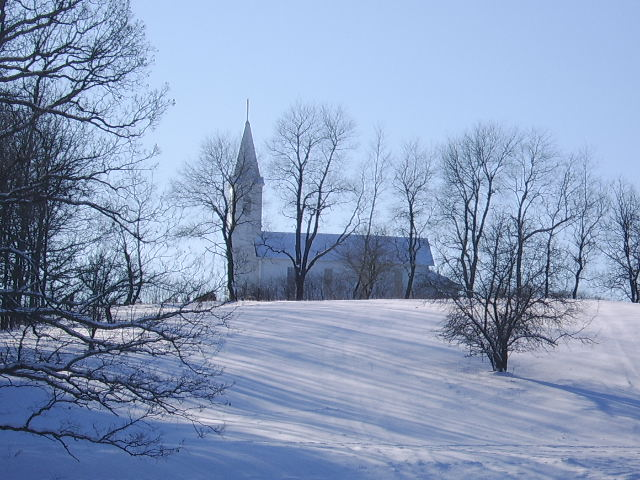
- St. John's Wedding Chapel is a church from the 1860s that has been moved to Oak Hill, an unincorporated hamlet in Apple River Township (January, 2008).

- Location in Jo Daviess County

- Jo Daviess County's location in Illinois
- Coordinates: 42°28′44″N 90°08′16″W
- Country: United States
- State: Illinois
- County: Jo Daviess
- Established: September 13, 1858

Government
  - Supervisor: James C. Goken

Area
  - Total: 18.52 sq mi (48.0 km^{2})
  - Land: 18.52 sq mi (48.0 km^{2})
  - Water: 0 sq mi (0 km^{2}) 0%
- Elevation: 958 ft (292 m)

Population (2020)
  - Total: 459
  - Density: 24.8/sq mi (9.57/km^{2})
- Time zone: UTC-6 (CST)
  - Summer (DST): UTC-5 (CDT)
- ZIP codes: 61001, 61075
- FIPS code: 17-085-01686

Apple River Township is one of 23 townships in Jo Daviess County, Illinois, United States. As of the 2020 census, its population was 459 and it contained 250 housing units. It was formed from Thompson Township on September 13, 1858.

== Geography ==
According to the 2021 census gazetteer files, Apple River Township has a total area of 18.52 square miles (47.97 km^{2}), all land.

=== Cities, towns, villages ===
- Apple River

=== Cemeteries ===
The township contains Saint Joseph Cemetery.

=== Airports and landing strips ===
- Foster Field (IL28)

== Demographics ==
As of the 2020 census there were 459 people, 197 households, and 136 families residing in the township. The population density was 24.79 inhabitants per square mile (9.57/km^{2}). There were 250 housing units at an average density of 13.50 per square mile (5.21/km^{2}). The racial makeup of the township was 94.99% White, 0.87% African American, 0.00% Native American, 0.00% Asian, 0.00% Pacific Islander, 0.65% from other races, and 3.49% from two or more races. Hispanic or Latino people of any race were 1.09% of the population.

There were 197 households, out of which 30.50% had children under the age of 18 living with them, 49.24% were married couples living together, 9.14% had a female householder with no spouse present, and 30.96% were non-families. 27.90% of all households were made up of individuals, and 14.70% had someone living alone who was 65 years of age or older. The average household size was 2.14 and the average family size was 2.49.

The township's age distribution consisted of 20.4% under the age of 18, 12.6% from 18 to 24, 16.8% from 25 to 44, 31.3% from 45 to 64, and 19.0% who were 65 years of age or older. The median age was 46.5 years. For every 100 females, there were 97.2 males. For every 100 females age 18 and over, there were 102.4 males.

The median income for a household in the township was $48,750, and the median income for a family was $48,409. Males had a median income of $30,125 versus $26,964 for females. The per capita income for the township was $28,466. About 9.6% of families and 14.9% of the population were below the poverty line, including 22.1% of those under age 18 and 2.5% of those age 65 or over.

Historical population
| Census | Pop. | Note | %± |
|---|---|---|---|
| 2000 | 517 | | — |
| 2010 | 498 | | −3.7% |
| 2020 | 459 | | −7.8% |
U.S. Decennial Census

== School districts ==
- Scales Mound Community Unit School District 211
- Warren Community Unit School District 205

== Political districts ==
- Illinois' 16th congressional district
- State House District 89
- State Senate District 45
