= Scales Mound, Illinois =

Scales Mound
- Village
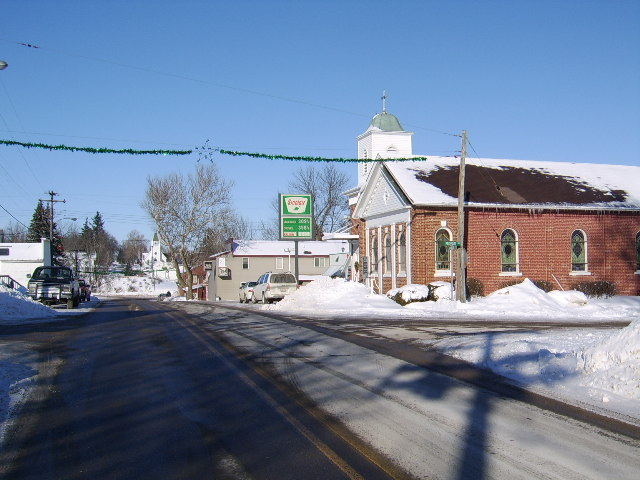
- Scales Mound - Franklin Street in winter 2008

- Seal
- Motto: At the Top of Illinois
- Location of Scales Mound in Daviess County, Illinois
- Coordinates: 42°28′31″N 90°15′02″W
- Country: United States
- State: Illinois
- County: Jo Daviess
- Township: Scales Mound

Area
  - Total: 0.63 sq mi (1.63 km^{2})
  - Land: 0.63 sq mi (1.63 km^{2})
  - Water: 0 sq mi (0.00 km^{2})
- Elevation: 951 ft (290 m)

Population (2020)
  - Total: 436
  - Density: 693.8/sq mi (267.89/km^{2})
- Time zone: UTC-6 (CST)
  - Summer (DST): UTC-5 (CDT)
- ZIP code: 61075
- Area code: 815
- FIPS code: 17-67925
- GNIS feature ID: 2399768
- Website: scalesmound.com

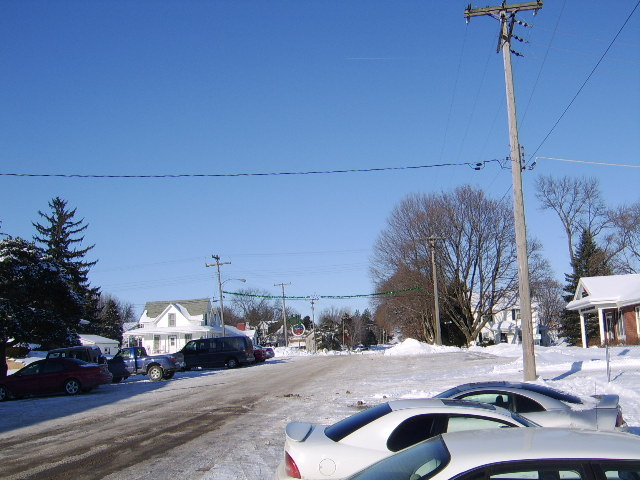
Scales Mound - Main Street in winter 2008

Scales Mound is a village in Jo Daviess County, Illinois, United States. The population was 436 at the 2020 census.

== History ==
The original town of Scales Mound was located at the base of an erosional remnant similar to Charles Mound, about a mile southwest of the present-day village. In 1830 Samuel Scales purchased the original village site from John Sole and built a tavern at the base of the mound along Sucker Trail, a major east–west corridor. The land that the present-day village of Scales Mound is on was purchased from the U.S. government in 1848 by a man named Dunning. Little is known about Dunning or the use of the land until the 1850s.

In 1851 the Illinois Central Railroad (ICRR) was established and it would become a major factor in the settlement of much of rural Illinois, including Scales Mound. In September 1853, anticipating the arrival of the railroad, the village of Scales Mound was platted by Josiah Conlee and B.B. Provost. During the summer of 1854 track crews from ICRR laid out 20 miles (32 km) of track between Scales Mound and Apple River and trains were running the line the day after completion. With the arrival of the railroad, Scales Mound's first building was constructed in the late fall of 1854, a store built by Sherman Eddy.

== Geography ==
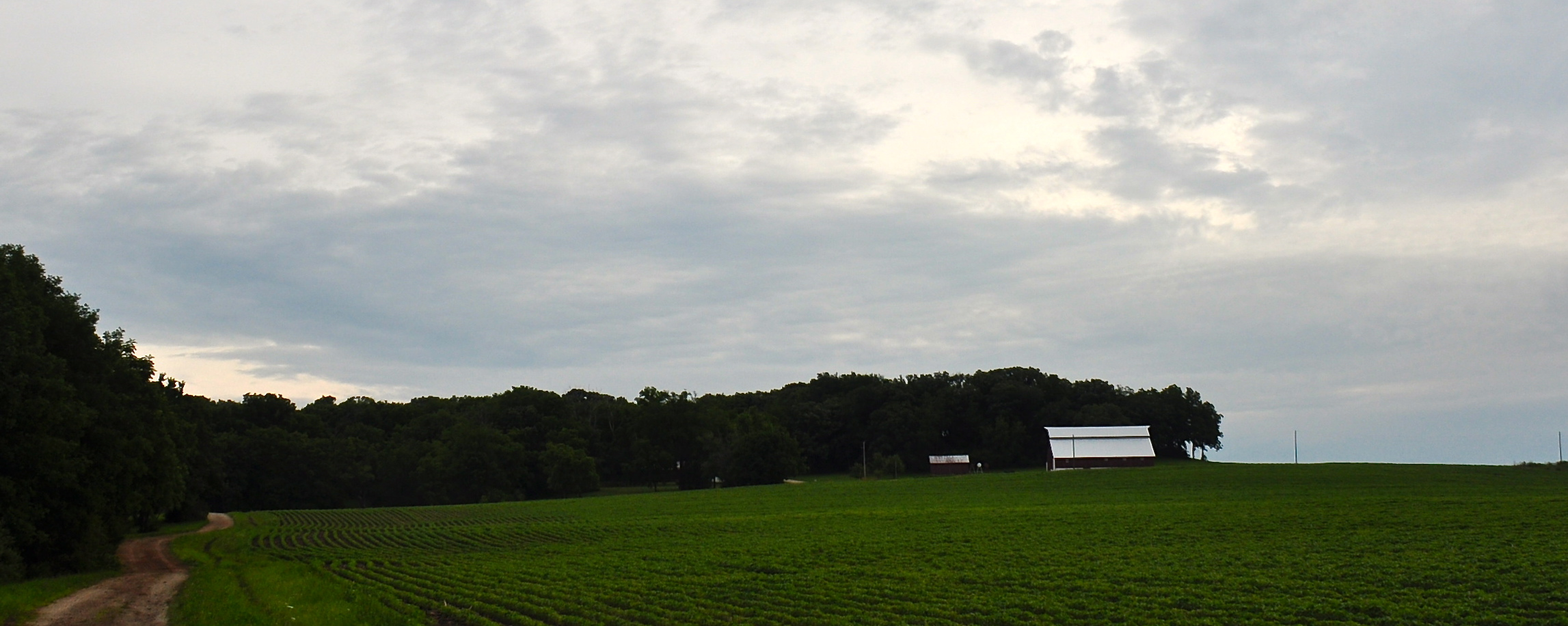
Charles Mound, at 1235 feet the highest natural point in Illinois, is located near Scales Mound, Illinois.

=== Location ===
Scales Mound lies at the northwestern tip of Illinois in Jo Daviess County, part of the Driftless Area. Scales Mound is located near the highest point in Illinois, Charles Mound, and on the Stagecoach Trail. It has an annual festival, Stagecoach Trail days.

According to the 2021 census gazetteer files, Scales Mound has a total area of 0.63 square miles (1.63 km^{2}), all land.

=== Topography ===
Scales Mound is located in a region of the U.S. Midwest known as the Driftless Area, so called because it escaped glaciation during the last ice age. It covers parts of Illinois, Wisconsin, Minnesota and Iowa. The Illinois section is mostly limited to Jo Daviess County and small parts of Whiteside and Carroll County in northwest Illinois. The topography of the area is characterized by hilly terrain and wooded ridges. Common features found in the Scales Mound area include canyons, bluffs, ravines and palisades. Near Charles Mound, the highest point in Illinois at 1235 feet, Scales Mound is said to be "At the Top of Illinois".

=== Climate ===
Climate data for Scales Mound, Illinois
Month	Jan	Feb	Mar	Apr	May	Jun	Jul	Aug	Sep	Oct	Nov	Dec	Year
Mean daily maximum °F (°C)	27 (−3)	34 (1)	45 (7)	59 (15)	72 (22)	81 (27)	84 (29)	81 (27)	73 (23)	63 (17)	46 (8)	34 (1)	58 (15)
Mean daily minimum °F (°C)	3 (−16)	10 (−12)	21 (−6)	32 (0)	43 (6)	54 (12)	57 (14)	55 (13)	46 (8)	34 (1)	25 (−4)	12 (−11)	33 (0)
Average precipitation inches (mm)	1.12 (28.4)	1.24 (31.5)	2.58 (65.5)	3.38 (85.9)	3.57 (90.7)	5.07 (128.8)	2.90 (73.7)	4.4 (113)	3.63 (92.2)	2.51 (63.8)	2.71 (68.8)	1.8 (45)	34.91 (887.3)
Source: weather.com

== Demographics ==
Historical population
Census	Pop.	Note	%±
1880	311		—
1900	418		—
1910	388		−7.2%
1920	356		−8.2%
1930	348		−2.2%
1940	354		1.7%
1950	385		8.8%
1960	399		3.6%
1970	382		−4.3%
1980	347		−9.2%
1990	388		11.8%
2000	401		3.4%
2010	376		−6.2%
2020	436		16.0%
U.S. Decennial Census

As of the 2020 census there were 436 people, 209 households, and 148 families residing in the village. The population density was 694.27 inhabitants per square mile (268.06/km^{2}). There were 189 housing units at an average density of 300.96 per square mile (116.20/km^{2}). The racial makeup of the village was 94.27% White, 0.46% African American, 1.83% Native American, 0.00% Asian, 0.00% Pacific Islander, 0.46% from other races, and 2.98% from two or more races. Hispanic or Latino of any race were 2.52% of the population.

There were 209 households, out of which 36.8% had children under the age of 18 living with them, 56.46% were married couples living together, 5.74% had a female householder with no husband present, and 29.19% were non-families. 19.14% of all households were made up of individuals, and 10.05% had someone living alone who was 65 years of age or older. The average household size was 2.81 and the average family size was 2.40.

The village's age distribution consisted of 26.1% under the age of 18, 7.0% from 18 to 24, 24% from 25 to 44, 21.4% from 45 to 64, and 21.7% who were 65 years of age or older. The median age was 37.9 years. For every 100 females, there were 111.8 males. For every 100 females age 18 and over, there were 107.3 males.

The median income for a household in the village was $57,292, and the median income for a family was $59,750. Males had a median income of $34,750 versus $30,833 for females. The per capita income for the village was $32,767. About 6.1% of families and 7.0% of the population were below the poverty line, including 10.0% of those under age 18 and 0.9% of those age 65 or over.

== Education ==
Scales Mound has one K-12 school (high school included). Its mascot is the Hornet.

== Culture ==
- Scales Mound Historic District
