= Apple River (Illinois) =

River in Illinois and Wisconsin, United States

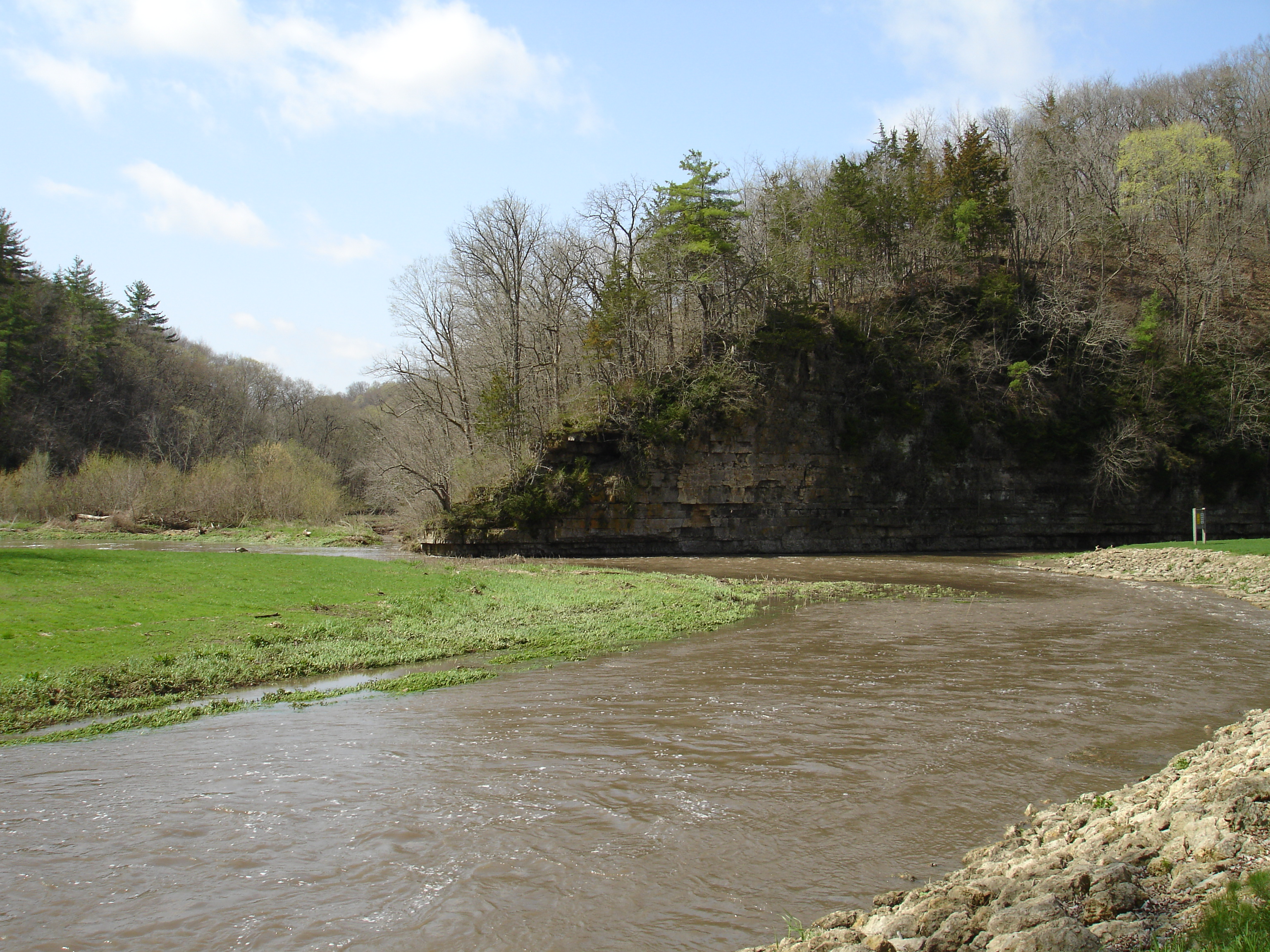
- The confluence of the South Fork Apple River and the Apple River within Apple River Canyon State Park

Location
- Country: United States
- State: Illinois, Wisconsin

Physical characteristics
- Source
  - location: East of Shullsburg, Lafayette County, Wisconsin
  - coordinates: 42°33′51″N 90°09′47″W
- Mouth: Mississippi River
  - location: Northwest of Savanna, Carroll County, Illinois
  - coordinates: 42°10′35″N 90°14′36″W
- Length: 55 mi (89 km)
- Discharge
  - location: Hanover, Illinois
  - average: 199 cu/ft. per sec.

The Apple River is a tributary of the Mississippi River, about 55 miles (89 km) long, in southwestern Wisconsin and northwestern Illinois in the United States. It rises in Lafayette County, Wisconsin, and flows for most of its length in Illinois, through Jo Daviess and Carroll Counties. Along its course it passes through Apple River Canyon State Park and the town of Hanover. It flows into the Mississippi River about 7 mi (11 km) northwest of Savanna.

In Jo Daviess County, it collects two short tributaries known as the West Fork Apple River and South Fork Apple River.

== Toponymy ==
Apple River was so named on account of the crabapple trees along its course. A folk etymology maintains the river derives its name from a German named Appel who fell near the river in the Black Hawk War.

== Geology ==
The river is part of the Driftless Area of Illinois, a region that was bypassed by the last ice age; "the glacial sweep which ironed out hills and filled valleys in other parts of the state left this area unscratched. During the Ice Age, the Apple River had its original course reversed. It once flowed to the Pecatonica River. It now flows southwest to the Mississippi River. The result is a deep canyon, part of which is preserved in Apple River Canyon State Park.

== See also ==
- List of tributaries of the Mississippi River
- List of Illinois rivers
- List of Wisconsin rivers
- Millville Town Site
