= Percy Pepoon =

American politician

Member of the Missouri Senate from the 30th district
- In office elected 1934 – ?

Personal details
- Born: November 11, 1861 Warren, Illinois
- Died: September 7, 1939 (aged 77) St. Louis, Missouri
- Party: Democratic
- Spouse: Beatrice Trenchard Viggers
- Children: 3
- Education: United States Military Academy

Percy Pepoon (November 11, 1861 - September 7, 1939) was an American politician who served in the Missouri Senate. He previously served as mayor of Hardy, Arkansas. Pepoon purchased the Hardy Herald newspaper in 1903.
