= Apple River, Illinois =

Apple River
- Village
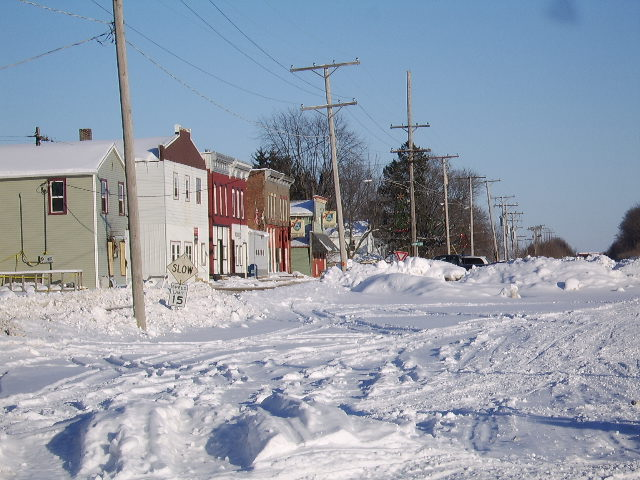
- Apple River - Railroad Street in winter 2008
- Etymology: the nearby Apple River
- Location of Apple River in Jo Daviess County, Illinois
- Coordinates: 42°30′01″N 90°05′35″W
- Country: United States
- State: Illinois
- County: Jo Daviess
- Township: Apple River

Area
  - Total: 0.70 sq mi (1.82 km^{2})
  - Land: 0.70 sq mi (1.82 km^{2})
  - Water: 0 sq mi (0 km^{2})
- Elevation: 1,010 ft (310 m)

Population (2020)
  - Total: 347
  - Density: 492.5/sq mi (190.16/km^{2})
- Time zone: UTC-6 (CST)
  - Summer (DST): UTC-5 (CDT)
- ZIP code: 61001
- Area codes: 815, 779
- FIPS code: 17-01673
- GNIS feature ID: 2397973
- Website: www.villageofappleriver.com

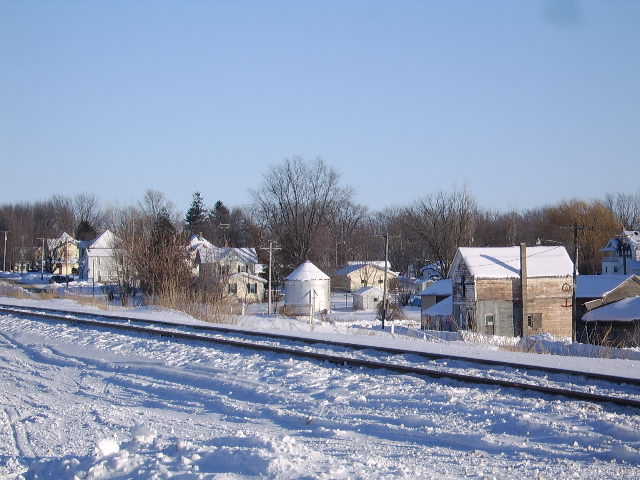
Apple River - The railroad between Freeport, Illinois and the Mississippi River in the foreground and Chestnut Street in the background, winter 2008

Apple River is a village in Jo Daviess County, Illinois, United States. Located on the southern border of Lafayette County, Wisconsin. The population was 347 at the 2020 census, down from 366 in 2010.

== History ==
The first home built in Apple River was by a man known as Daniel Robbins in 1832. By 1854 the Illinois Central Railroad was built through the township, the same year as the town's first general store owned by J. M. Irvine. Despite a vote being held in 1868, Apple River would not be incorporated as a village until 1870.

== Geography ==
According to the 2021 census gazetteer files, Apple River has a total area of 0.71 square miles (1.84 km^{2}), all land.

== Demographics ==
Historical population
Census	Pop.	Note	%±
1880	626		—
1890	572		−8.6%
1900	576		0.7%
1910	581		0.9%
1920	484		−16.7%
1930	421		−13.0%
1940	461		9.5%
1950	431		−6.5%
1960	477		10.7%
1970	482		1.0%
1980	472		−2.1%
1990	414		−12.3%
2000	379		−8.5%
2010	366		−3.4%
2020	347		−5.2%
U.S. Decennial Census

As of the 2020 census there were 347 people, 152 households, and 103 families residing in the village. The population density was 492.20 inhabitants per square mile (190.04/km^{2}). There were 190 housing units at an average density of 269.50 per square mile (104.05/km^{2}). The racial makeup of the village was 93.66% White, 1.15% African American, 0.00% Native American, 0.00% Asian, 0.00% Pacific Islander, 0.58% from other races, and 4.61% from two or more races. Hispanic or Latino of any race were 1.15% of the population.

There were 152 households, out of which 39.5% had children under the age of 18 living with them, 42.11% were married couples living together, 11.84% had a female householder with no husband present, and 32.24% were non-families. 28.29% of all households were made up of individuals, and 13.16% had someone living alone who was 65 years of age or older. The average household size was 2.54 and the average family size was 2.19.

The village's age distribution consisted of 25.8% under the age of 18, 12.9% from 18 to 24, 19.8% from 25 to 44, 27% from 45 to 64, and 14.4% who were 65 years of age or older. The median age was 34.5 years. For every 100 females, there were 85.0 males. For every 100 females age 18 and over, there were 87.1 males.

The median income for a household in the village was $42,778, and the median income for a family was $44,028. Males had a median income of $31,250 versus $32,708 for females. The per capita income for the village was $21,763. About 12.6% of families and 18.9% of the population were below the poverty line, including 22.1% of those under age 18 and 4.2% of those age 65 or over.

== Education ==
It is in the Warren Community Unit School District 205.

== Notable residents ==
- Terrence Ingram, American author and activist

== See also ==
- Apple River Canyon State Park
- Millville, Illinois
