= Nora, Illinois =

Nora
- Village
- Location of Nora in Jo Daviess County, Illinois
- Coordinates: 42°27′23″N 89°56′45″W
- Country: United States
- State: Illinois
- County: Jo Daviess
- Township: Nora

Area
  - Total: 0.83 sq mi (2.15 km^{2})
  - Land: 0.83 sq mi (2.15 km^{2})
  - Water: 0 sq mi (0 km^{2})
- Elevation: 1,007 ft (307 m)

Population (2020)
  - Total: 107
  - Density: 129.0/sq mi (49.79/km^{2})
- Time zone: UTC-6 (CST)
  - Summer (DST): UTC-5 (CDT)
- ZIP code: 61059
- Area code: 815
- FIPS code: 17-53195
- GNIS feature ID: 2399501

Nora is a village in Jo Daviess County, Illinois, United States. In 2020, the population was 107, down from 121 according to the 2010 census, which was up from 118 in 2000.

== History ==
Nora was named by a railroad official for a female settler. According to another source, the name "Nora" was selected on account of its brevity, Nora being a quite small place.

Nora Elementary School (whose athletic nickname was the Navahos) was a fixture of the town for years. In the early 1980s consolidation led to the school's closure and it was converted to apartments. Until the 1960s the town had a grocery store run by Belle Lutter, who claimed to have ridden Ulysses S. Grant's horse as a girl.

== Geography ==
According to the 2021 census gazetteer files, Nora has a total area of 0.83 square miles (2.15 km^{2}), all land.

== Demographics ==
Historical population
Census	Pop.	Note	%±
1880	333		—
1890	309		−7.2%
1900	312		1.0%
1910	251		−19.6%
1920	213		−15.1%
1930	180		−15.5%
1940	207		15.0%
1950	208		0.5%
1960	229		10.1%
1970	175		−23.6%
1980	185		5.7%
1990	162		−12.4%
2000	118		−27.2%
2010	121		2.5%
2020	107		−11.6%
U.S. Decennial Census

As of the 2020 census there were 107 people, 89 households, and 37 families residing in the village. The population density was 128.92 inhabitants per square mile (49.78/km^{2}). There were 53 housing units at an average density of 63.86 per square mile (24.66/km^{2}). The racial makeup of the village was 100.00% White, 0.00% African American, 0.00% Native American, 0.00% Asian, 0.00% Pacific Islander, 0.00% from other races, and 0.00% from two or more races. Hispanic or Latino of any race were 2.80% of the population.

There were 89 households, out of which 25.8% had children under the age of 18 living with them, 25.84% were married couples living together, 3.37% had a female householder with no husband present, and 58.43% were non-families. 11.24% of all households were made up of individuals, and 2.25% had someone living alone who was 65 years of age or older. The average household size was 3.05 and the average family size was 2.12.

The village's age distribution consisted of 22.8% under the age of 18, 31.2% from 18 to 24, 13.7% from 25 to 44, 22.2% from 45 to 64, and 10.1% who were 65 years of age or older. The median age was 23.6 years. For every 100 females, there were 182.1 males. For every 100 females age 18 and over, there were 224.4 males.

The median income for a household in the village was $44,263, and the median income for a family was $76,875. Males had a median income of $21,775 versus $32,917 for females. The per capita income for the village was $22,831. About 8.1% of families and 6.3% of the population were below the poverty line, including 0.0% of those under age 18 and 10.5% of those age 65 or over.

== Education ==
It is in the Warren Community Unit School District 205.
