= Charles Mound =

Land formation

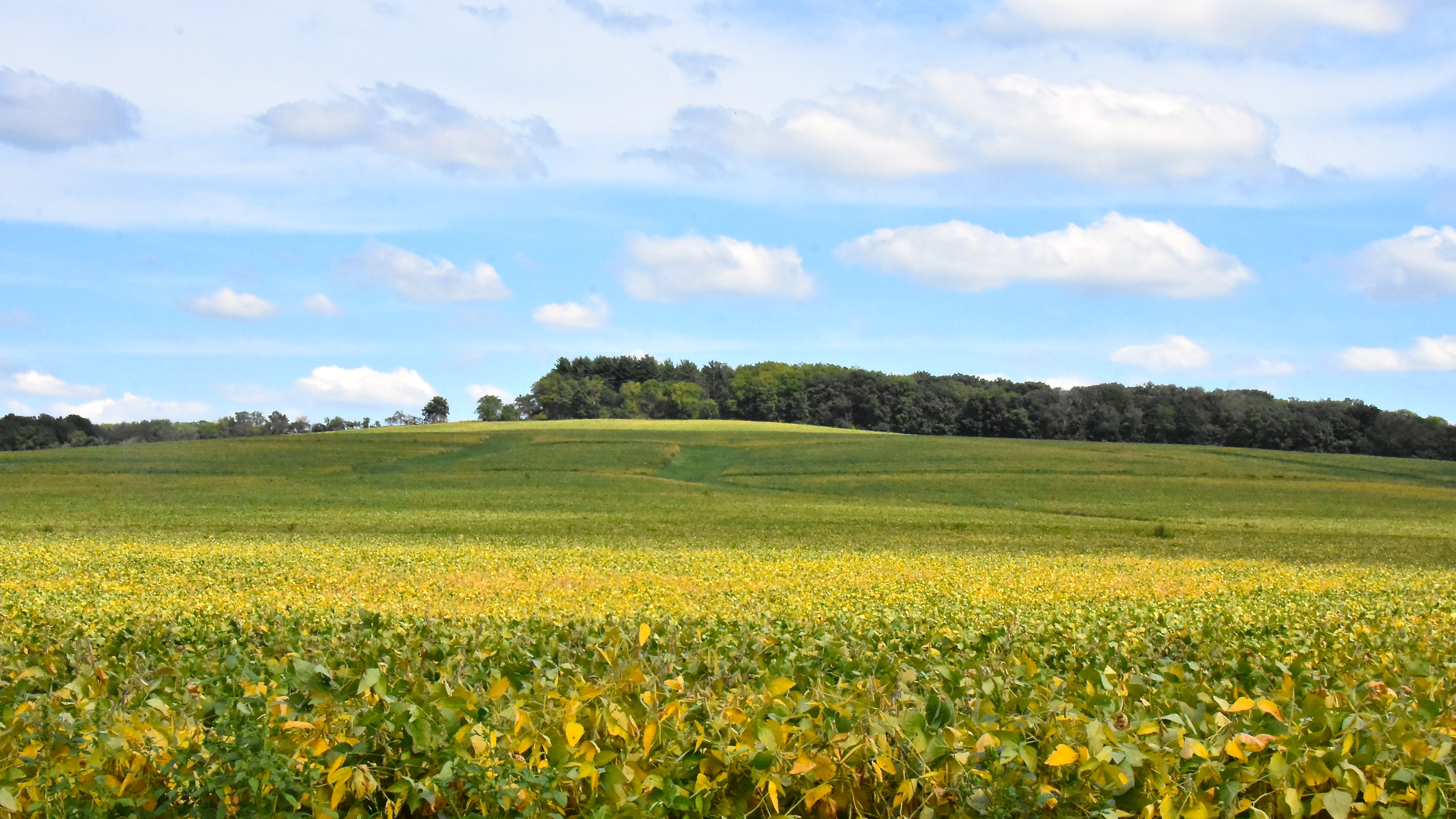
- Looking eastward at Charles Mound, the highest point in Illinois from Elizabeth Scales Mound Road, September 2016

Highest point
- Elevation: 1,235 ft (376 m) NAVD 88
- Prominence: 95 ft (29 m)
- Listing: U.S. state high points 45th
- Coordinates: 42°30′14.55931″N 90°14′23.01334″W

Geography
- Location within Illinois
- Country: United States
- State: Illinois
- County: Jo Daviess
- Township: Scales Mound
- Topo map: USGS Shullsburg

Climbing
- Easiest route: Unpaved road

Charles Mound is a gentle, 1,235-foot (376 m) high hill located in Scales Mound Township, Jo Daviess County, Illinois, United States. It is 2 miles (3.2 km) northeast of the small town of Scales Mound, and 11 miles (18 km) northeast of Galena. Despite its name, Charles Mound is a naturally occurring, erosional feature and is not to be confused with the intentional mounds created by native cultures. It is the highest natural point in the state and is thus considered a state highpoint. It is the lowest state highpoint in the Midwestern region of the United States.

== Geography ==
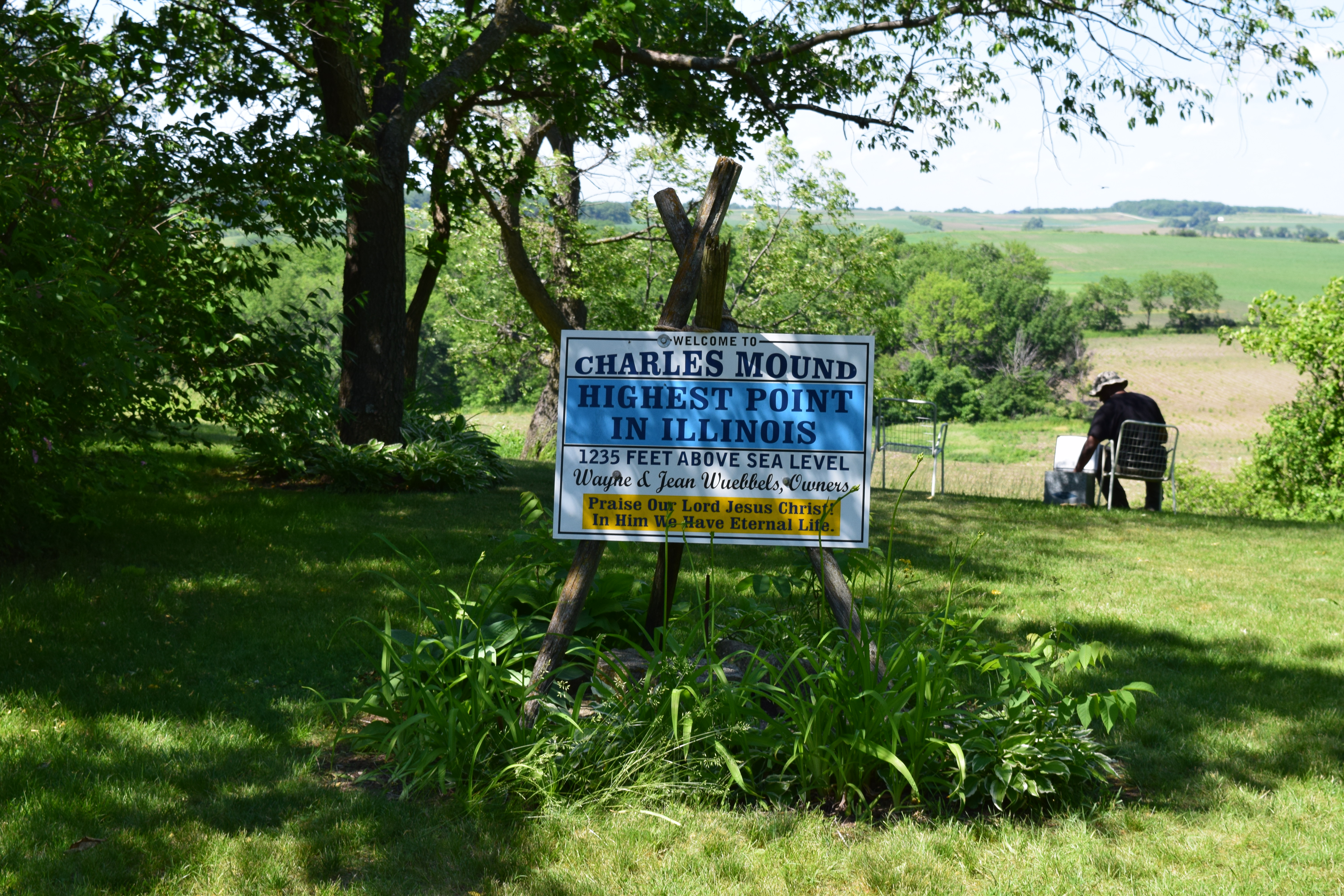
Sign at the summit of Charles Mound, June 2016

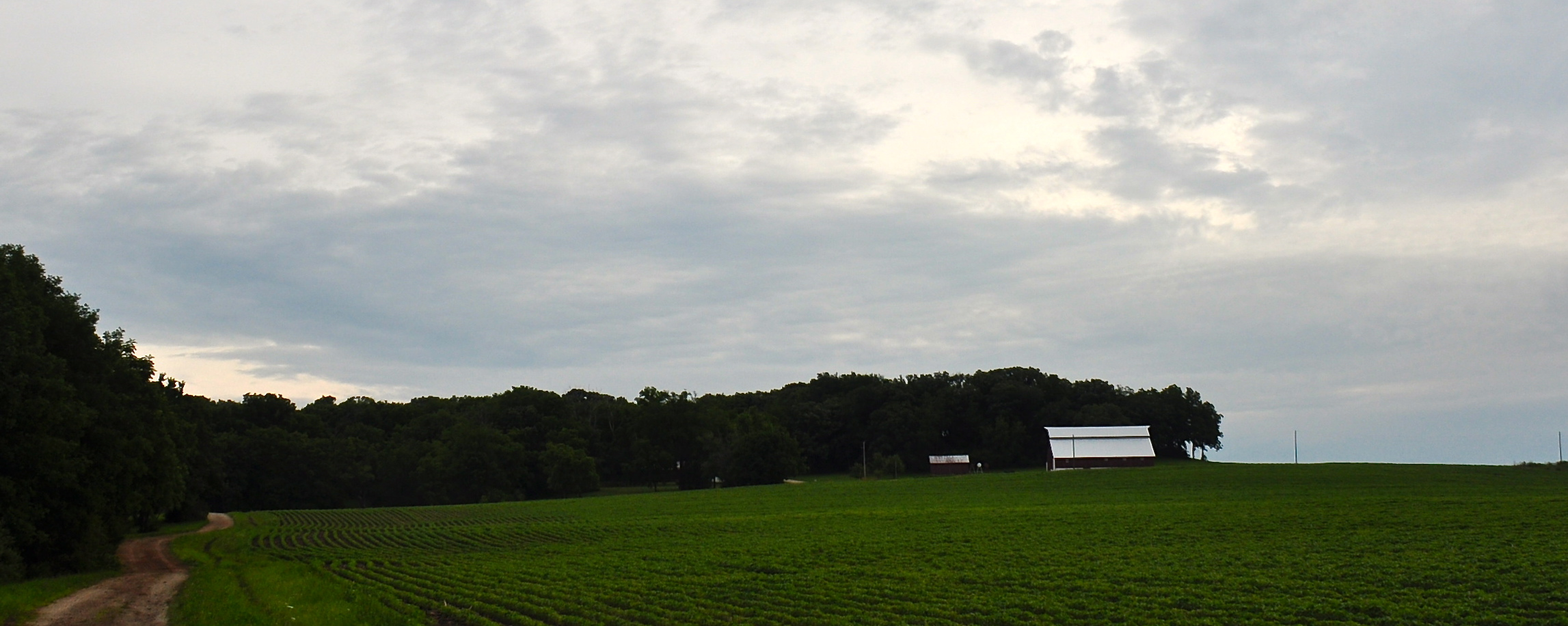
Charles Mound, July 2014

Charles Mound is the highest natural point in Illinois. (The highest point is the Willis Tower, formerly known as the Sears Tower.) The top of the hill is about 0.25 miles (400 m) from the Wisconsin border. It is within the Driftless Area, a region of Illinois, Iowa, Minnesota, and Wisconsin that was not covered or ground down by the last continental glaciers. The hill itself is an erosional remnant, similar to that on which the original village site of Scales Mound was located. Shallow Elizabeth silt loam soil is on the summit and the surrounding area has deeper silty clay loam of the Lacrescent series.

== Geology ==
As mapped in the early 1960's by Mullens, Charles Mound is an outlier and erosional remnant of Silurian Edgewood Dolomite overlying strata of the Ordovician Maquoketa Formation. The Maquoketa Formation consists of dark-gray clayey siltstone and silty dolomite that occurs in beds that are 2 in (5.1 cm) to 5 ft (1.5 m) thick. Within the Formation, layers of dark grayish-orange silty dolomite that are up to 2 in (5.1 cm) thick separate the beds of siltstone and silty dolomite. A prominent grayish-orange and grayish-yellow granular dolomite bed that ranges from 3 to 13 in (7.6 to 33.0 cm) in thickness, which contains abundant fossil bryozoa fragments, locally outcrops near Charles Mound. The Edgewood Dolomite is unconformably overlying, and in erosional contact with, the Maquoketa Formation. The maximum thickness of Edgewood Dolomite preserved beneath Charles Mound is about 50 ft (15 m). The Edgewood Dolomite outcrops at the northwest and southeast ends of Charles Mound, and there presents as thin beds of grayish-orange and olive-gray medium-grained dolomite that contains light-gray chert nodules. The chert nodules are irregular in shape, 1 to 3 in (2.5 to 7.6 cm) thick and as much as 8 in (20 cm) long. Just southwest of Charles Mound is an abandoned prospecting shaft for lead-zinc ore.

== Settlement ==
Elijah Charles, one of the region's first permanent settlers, arrived in 1828 and settled at the base of the mound and the hill assumed his name.

== Access ==
Charles Mound is located on rolling farmland that is privately owned. The landowners allow public access on the first full weekends of the months of June, July, August, and September as well as President's Day Weekend in February.

Public access to the property is at 688 West Charles Mound Road, where there is a gate and access to the highpoint by foot. Visitors should park along the road and not block access to the gate.

== See also ==
- List of U.S. states by elevation
