= Scales Mound Township, Illinois =

Scales Mound Township
- Township
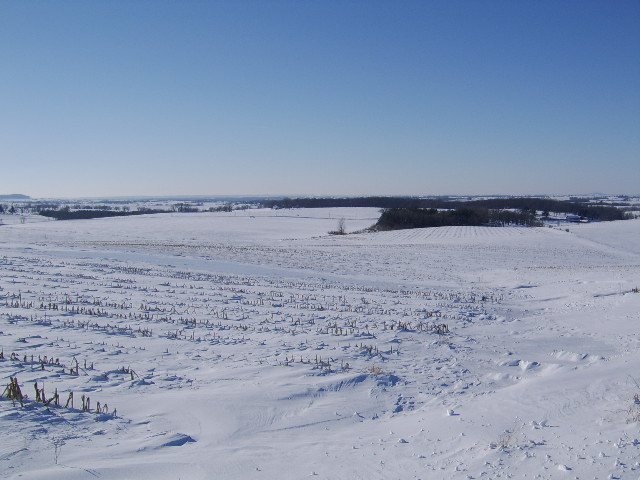
- Winter landscape in Scales Mound Township, north of Scales Mound, Illinois (2008)

- Location in Jo Daviess County

- Jo Daviess County's location in Illinois
- Coordinates: 42°28′53″N 90°14′54″W
- Country: United States
- State: Illinois
- County: Jo Daviess
- Established: March 7, 1855

Government
  - Supervisor: Steve Stadel

Area
  - Total: 18.54 sq mi (48.0 km^{2})
  - Land: 18.54 sq mi (48.0 km^{2})
  - Water: 0 sq mi (0 km^{2}) 0%
- Elevation: 988 ft (301 m)
- Highest elevation: 1,235 ft (376 m)

Population (2020)
  - Total: 649
  - Density: 35.0/sq mi (13.5/km^{2})
- Time zone: UTC-6 (CST)
  - Summer (DST): UTC-5 (CDT)
- ZIP codes: 61001, 61075
- FIPS code: 17-085-67938

Scales Mound Township is one of 23 townships in Jo Daviess County, Illinois, United States. As of the 2020 census, its population was 649 and it contained 291 housing units. It was formed from Council Hill and Thompson townships on March 7, 1855.

Charles Mound, the highest point in Illinois, is located within Scales Mound Township.

== Geography ==
According to the 2021 census gazetteer files, Scales Mound Township has a total area of 18.54 square miles (48.02 km^{2}), all land.

The highest point in Illinois, Charles Mound (1,235 ft; 376 m), is located in Scales Mount Township.

=== Cities, towns, villages ===
- Scales Mound

=== Cemeteries ===
The township contains two cemeteries: Citizens and Holy Trinity.

== Demographics ==
As of the 2020 census there were 649 people, 318 households, and 227 families residing in the township. The population density was 35.01 inhabitants per square mile (13.52/km^{2}). There were 291 housing units at an average density of 15.70 per square mile (6.06/km^{2}). The racial makeup of the township was 96.15% White, 0.31% African American, 1.23% Native American, 0.00% Asian, 0.00% Pacific Islander, 0.31% from other races, and 2.00% from two or more races. Hispanic or Latino of any race were 1.69% of the population.

There were 318 households, out of which 32.10% had children under the age of 18 living with them, 57.55% were married couples living together, 3.77% had a female householder with no spouse present, and 28.62% were non-families. 22.00% of all households were made up of individuals, and 13.50% had someone living alone who was 65 years of age or older. The average household size was 2.31 and the average family size was 2.73.

The township's age distribution consisted of 23.6% under the age of 18, 6.3% from 18 to 24, 19.5% from 25 to 44, 23.5% from 45 to 64, and 27.0% who were 65 years of age or older. The median age was 45.3 years. For every 100 females, there were 110.9 males. For every 100 females age 18 and over, there were 112.9 males.

The median income for a household in the township was $58,947, and the median income for a family was $67,708. Males had a median income of $36,875 versus $33,571 for females. The per capita income for the township was $34,028. About 9.7% of families and 9.7% of the population were below the poverty line, including 13.3% of those under age 18 and 3.0% of those age 65 or over.

Historical population
Census	Pop.	Note	%±
2000	658		—
2010	622		−5.5%
2020	649		4.3%
U.S. Decennial Census

== School districts ==
- Scales Mound Community Unit School District 211

== Political districts ==
- Illinois' 16th congressional district
- State House District 89
- State Senate District 45
