= Warren Community Unit School District 205 =

School district in Jo Daviess County, Illinois, United States

Address
- 311 South Water Street Warren, Illinois, 61087; United States

District information
- Type: Public
- Grades: PreK–12
- NCES District ID: 1740740

Students and staff
- Students: 375

Other information
- Website: 205warren.net

Warren Community Unit School District 205 is a school district headquartered in Warren, Illinois.

Mostly in Jo Daviess County, it includes Warren, Apple River, Nora, and a portion of Apple Canyon Lake. The district extends into Stephenson County.

It operates Warren Elementary School and Warren Jr/Sr High School.
