= Theodore Pepoon =

American politician

Theodore Weld Pepoon (August 29, 1836 – 1910) was a Republican Nebraska politician and publisher, living and working in Pawnee County and nearby areas. He is principally remembered for his work on reforming Nebraska's agricultural laws and for his stint in the 1880s as publisher of the Falls City Journal.

== Early life and education ==
I believe I have done nothing to disgrace the old Seminary, unless being a member of the Nebraska State Senate should be so considered.
— Theodore Pepoon, 1878

Pepoon was born in Lake County, Ohio on August 29, 1836. His fiercely abolitionist parents named him after Theodore Weld.

He moved with his parents and siblings to Jo Daviess County in far northwestern Illinois in 1850. For a time he attended the Mount Carroll Seminary (known today as Shimer College), where his sister was serving as an instructor of mathematics. He later leveraged this "practical education" for work as a teacher and a railroad clerk. In 1860, Pepoon married another former student of the Mount Carroll Seminary, Susan Robinson. She was from nearby Savanna, and was four years his junior.

On March 29, 1865, Pepoon joined the 96th Illinois infantry, later transferring to Company K of the 21st infantry. He did not see action, and mustered out in January 1866. According to his account, he did not join the Union army earlier only because he had been unable to leave the family farm unattended, all four of his brothers having enlisted.

In 1869, Pepoon and other members of his family moved to Table Rock, Nebraska, where he purchased a 250-acre homestead.

== Career ==
In 1876, Pepoon was elected to the Nebraska State Senate, the state legislature then being bicameral. Among the legislation that he successfully sponsored was an 1877 amendment to the state railroad law, requiring railroad companies to reimburse livestock owners for livestock struck by trains. Another required that livestock cars be cleaned to help "prevent the spread of hog cholera and kindred diseases."

In 1881, Pepoon bought a half-interest in the Falls City Journal, and moved to Falls City to work as the paper's editor and publisher. In this capacity, he strove to ensure that the paper reflected his own Radical Republican sensibilities. He remained connected with the paper until 1885.

Pepoon and his wife moved to Hardy, Arkansas in the late 1890s. When she died a few years later, Pepoon went to live with his daughters in Thayer, Missouri. He died there in October or November 1910.

== Works cited ==
- "Richardson County". History of the State of Nebraska. 1882. Archived from the original on November 2, 2002.
- Portrait and Biographical Album of Johnson and Pawnee Counties, Nebraska. Chapman Bros. 1889.
- State of Nebraska (1877). Laws Passed by the Legislature of the State of Nebraska.
