= Apple River Canyon State Park =

State park in Jo Daviess County, Illinois

- Apple River Canyon
- IUCN category V (protected landscape/seascape)
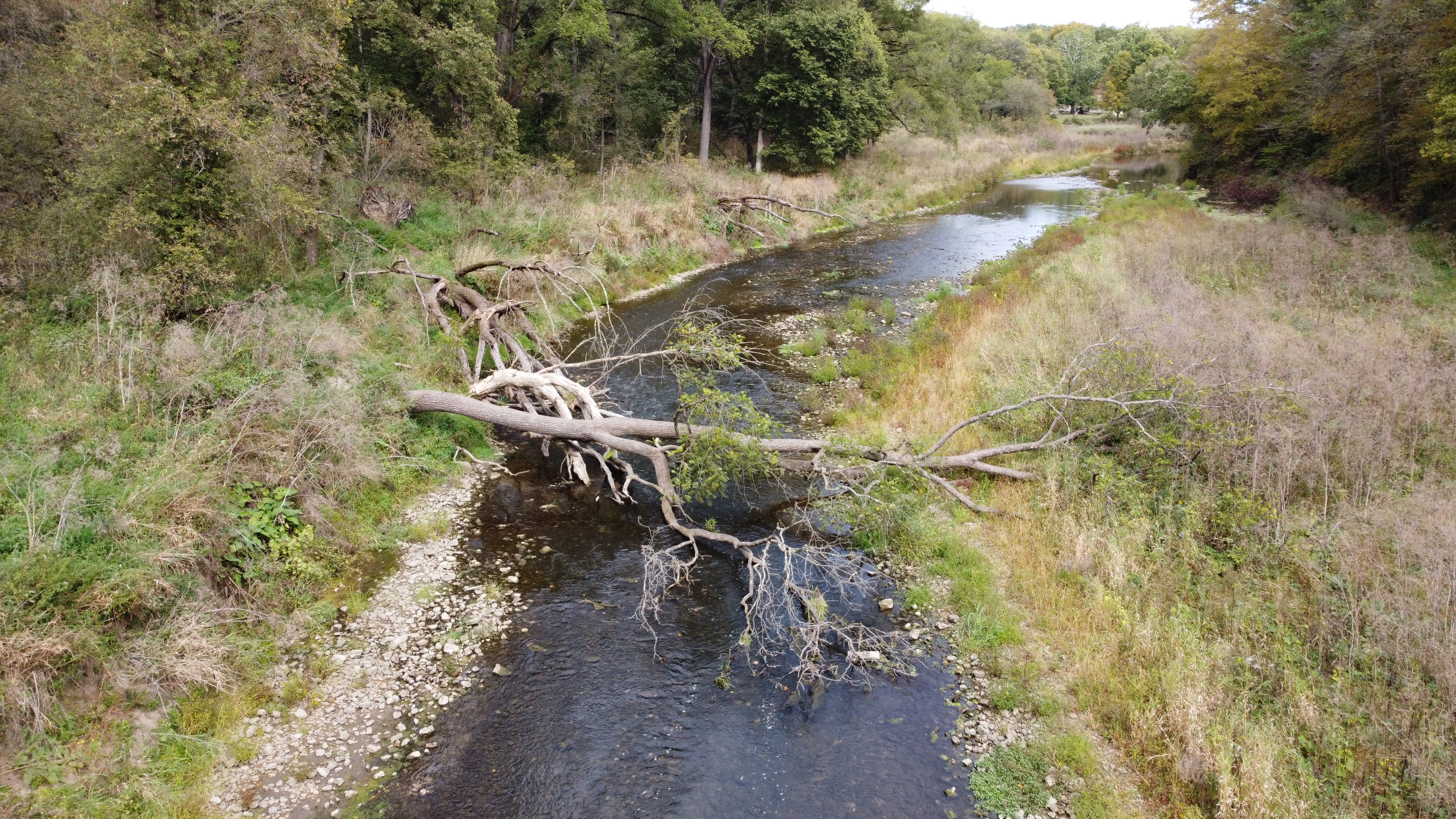
- The Apple River, at Apple River Canyon State Park

- Location within Illinois Location within the United States
- Location: Jo Daviess County, Illinois, United States
- Nearest city: Stockton, Illinois
- Coordinates: 42°26′46″N 90°03′09″W
- Area: 1,907 acres (7.72 km^{2})
- Established: 1932
- Governing body: Illinois Department of Natural Resources

Apple River Canyon State Park is an Illinois state park on 297 acres (120 ha) in Jo Daviess County, Illinois, United States. The park was begun with land purchased by the state in 1932, as a result of a prolonged campaign led by botanist Herman Silas Pepoon; with additional acquisitions since, 1,907 acres (772 ha) of land have been preserved to protect much of an 8 1/2-mile (13.7 km) long canyon on the Apple River.

The river canyon is part of the Driftless Area of Illinois, a region that was bypassed by the last ice age; "the glacial sweep which ironed out hills and filled valleys in other parts of the state left this area unscratched". During the dramatic events that surrounded the end of the last Ice Age, the Apple River, which once flowed eastward into the Pecatonica River, reversed its original course and began to flow southwest through an erosion gorge to the Mississippi. The result is a deep canyon, part of which is preserved in the Park. Loess covered the landscape and the soils that developed on it are mapped as Lacrescent silty clay loam and Dubuque silt loam.

The Apple River Canyon State Park, and the Land and Water Reserve within the park, offers hiking, fishing, and hunting on parcels of gorge land. There are several hiking trails through the woods with nice views of the river and bluffs, and a tent campground. Smallmouth bass live in the river.

== See also ==
- Millville Town Site
