= Warren, Illinois =

Warren
- Village
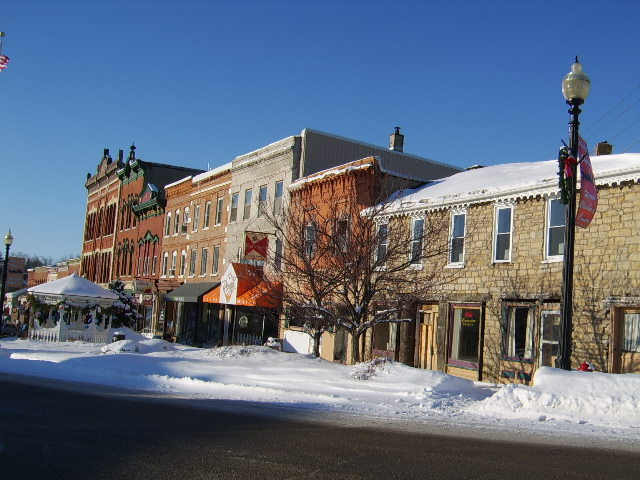
- Warren - Main Street in winter 2008

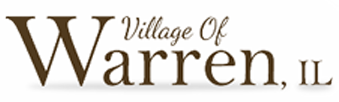
- Logo

- Location of Warren in Daviess County, Illinois
- Coordinates: 42°29′45″N 89°59′40″W
- Country: United States
- State: Illinois
- County: Jo Daviess
- Township: Warren

Area
  - Total: 1.03 sq mi (2.67 km^{2})
  - Land: 1.03 sq mi (2.67 km^{2})
  - Water: 0 sq mi (0 km^{2})
- Elevation: 981 ft (299 m)

Population (2020)
  - Total: 1,323
  - Density: 1,281.2/sq mi (494.69/km^{2})
- Time zone: UTC−6 (CST)
  - Summer (DST): UTC−5 (CDT)
- ZIP code: 61087
- Area code: 815
- FIPS code: 17-78851
- GNIS feature ID: 2400094
- Website: villageofwarren.com

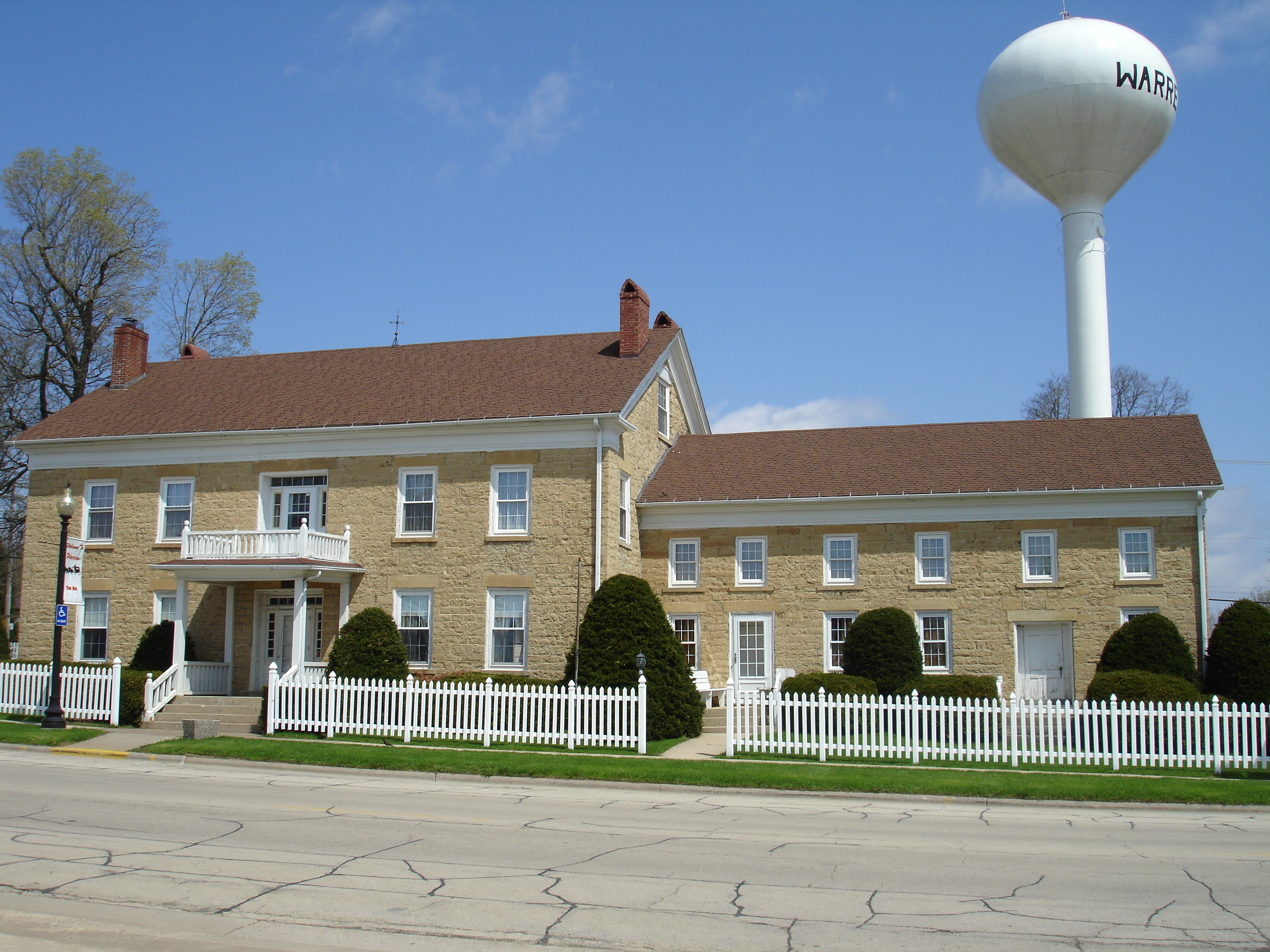
The Old Stone Hotel in Warren is on the U.S. National Register of Historic Places.

Warren is a village in Jo Daviess County, Illinois, United States. The population was 1,323 at the 2020 census, down from 1,428 at the 2010 census.

Warren was named after Warren Burnett, the first male child born at the site.

== History ==
Captain Alexander Burnett was the first known American settler in present-day Warren; he built a log cabin at the corner of what is now the corner of Main and Water Streets in 1843. In 1851 a stagecoach stop was erected on the Stagecoach Trail, the building still stands and is now serving as the Warren Community Building. The village was platted in 1853 along the proposed route for the Illinois Central Railroad tracks and later growth in Warren was heavily influenced by the presence of the railroad. The main commercial district is concentrated along both sides of the railroad tracks on Main and Railroad Streets. The village was officially incorporated in February 1857.

== Geography ==
According to the 2021 census gazetteer files, Warren has a total area of 1.03 square miles (2.67 km^{2}), all land.

== Demographics ==
Historical population
Census	Pop.	Note	%±
1860	825		—
1870	1,666		101.9%
1890	1,172		—
1900	1,327		13.2%
1910	1,331		0.3%
1920	1,253		−5.9%
1930	1,179		−5.9%
1940	1,119		−5.1%
1950	1,378		23.1%
1960	1,470		6.7%
1970	1,523		3.6%
1980	1,595		4.7%
1990	1,550		−2.8%
2000	1,496		−3.5%
2010	1,428		−4.5%
2020	1,323		−7.4%
U.S. Decennial Census

=== 2020 census ===
As of the 2020 census, Warren had a population of 1,323. The population density was 1,280.74 inhabitants per square mile (494.50/km^{2}). There were 661 housing units at an average density of 639.88 per square mile (247.06/km^{2}).

The median age was 46.3 years. 21.5% of residents were under the age of 18 and 22.9% were 65 years of age or older. For every 100 females, there were 99.8 males, and for every 100 females age 18 and over, there were 95.8 males age 18 and over.

0.0% of residents lived in urban areas, while 100.0% lived in rural areas.

There were 594 households in Warren, of which 23.7% had children under the age of 18 living in them. Of all households, 44.1% were married-couple households, 20.9% were households with a male householder and no spouse or partner present, and 27.4% were households with a female householder and no spouse or partner present. About 35.2% of all households were made up of individuals and 17.2% had someone living alone who was 65 years of age or older.

There were 661 housing units, of which 10.1% were vacant. The homeowner vacancy rate was 1.5% and the rental vacancy rate was 7.1%.

Racial composition as of the 2020 census
Race	Number	Percent
White	1,261	95.3%
Black or African American	0	0.0%
American Indian and Alaska Native	1	0.1%
Asian	0	0.0%
Native Hawaiian and Other Pacific Islander	0	0.0%
Some other race	19	1.4%
Two or more races	42	3.2%
Hispanic or Latino (of any race)	31	2.3%

=== Income and poverty ===
The median income for a household in the village was $51,618, and the median income for a family was $65,391. Males had a median income of $45,921 versus $25,938 for females. The per capita income for the village was $28,205. About 6.8% of families and 8.6% of the population were below the poverty line, including 7.8% of those under age 18 and 10.9% of those age 65 or over.

== Festivals ==
The Village of Warren holds "The Pumpkin Festival" every year on the last weekend of September. The festival includes a large parade, arts and crafts, and fall produce. Warren is also the location of the Jo Daviess County Fair. This is usually held around the first week of August. The event is the oldest county fair in the state of Illinois. It is also a location of the Stagecoach Trail Festival, held along the Stagecoach Trail.

== Notable people ==
- Angela Rose Canfield, first female mayor of Warren and first female mayor across Illinois
- Abner Dalrymple, left fielder with various teams, buried in Warren at Elmwood cemetery
- George Engebretson, member of the Wisconsin State Senate, born in Warren
- Herman Silas Pepoon, botanist and author, born in Warren on January 21, 1860

== Historical landmarks ==
- Old Stone Hotel
