= National Register of Historic Places listings in Jo Daviess County, Illinois =

Location of Jo Daviess County in Illinois

This is a list of the National Register of Historic Places listings in Jo Daviess County, Illinois.

This is intended to be a complete list of the properties and districts on the National Register of Historic Places in Jo Daviess County, Illinois, United States. Latitude and longitude coordinates are provided for many National Register properties and districts; these locations may be seen together in a map.

There are 19 properties and districts listed on the National Register in the county. One listing is also located partially in neighboring Dubuque County, Iowa.

This National Park Service list is complete through NPS recent listings posted July 31, 2026.

== Current listings ==
	Name on the Register	Image	Date listed	Location	City or town	Description
1	Apple River Fort Site	Apple River Fort Site	November 7, 1997 (#97001332)	0.25 miles east-southeast of the junction of Mrytle and Illinois Sts. 42°19′05″N 90°12′51″W	Elizabeth	
2	Bishop's Busy Big Store-Lyric Opera House		August 15, 2022 (#100008001)	137 North Main St. 42°19′05″N 90°13′17″W	Elizabeth	
3	John Chapman Village Site	John Chapman Village Site	December 10, 2009 (#09001058)	Western side of Illinois Route 84, south of Hanover; 42°14′33″N 90°16′03″W	Hanover	
4	Chicago Great Western Railroad Depot	Chicago Great Western Railroad Depot	February 16, 1996 (#96000098)	Myrtle St. between N. Madison and Vine Sts. 42°19′01″N 90°13′21″W	Elizabeth	
5	Julien Dubuque Bridge	Julien Dubuque Bridge	August 27, 1999 (#99001034)	U.S. Route 20 over the Mississippi River; 42°29′30″N 90°39′17″W	East Dubuque	part of the Highway Bridges of Iowa MPS; also on the National Register of Historic Places listings in Dubuque County, Iowa
6	East Dubuque School	East Dubuque School	November 12, 1982 (#82000396)	Montgomery Ave. 42°29′38″N 90°38′29″W	East Dubuque	
7	Henry N. Frentess Farmstead	Henry N. Frentess Farmstead	February 4, 2011 (#10001202)	19140 U.S. Route 20 W. 42°28′20″N 90°36′30″W	East Dubuque	
8	Galena Historic District	Galena Historic District	October 18, 1969 (#69000056)	Roughly bounded by Davis Creek and 4th, 5th, Adams, Field, Wann, N. Dodge, Fulton, N. Hickory, Hill, Ridge, and Spring Sts. 42°25′06″N 90°25′40″W	Galena	Boundary increase and decrease October 23, 2013.
9	Ulysses S. Grant House	Ulysses S. Grant House	October 15, 1966 (#66000322)	511 Bouthillier St. 42°24′40″N 90°25′27″W	Galena	
10	Henry W. Miller House	Henry W. Miller House	October 13, 2010 (#10000836)	11672 W. Norris Ln. 42°26′48″N 90°27′36″W	Galena	
11	Millville Town Site	Millville Town Site	March 3, 2003 (#03000066)	Apple River Canyon State Park, 8663 E. Canyon Rd. 42°26′36″N 90°03′07″W	Apple River	
12	Old Market House	Old Market House	July 16, 1973 (#73000707)	Market Square-Commerce St. 42°24′56″N 90°25′38″W	Galena	
13	Old Stone Hotel	Old Stone Hotel	April 16, 1975 (#75000665)	110 W. Main St. 42°29′50″N 89°59′28″W	Warren	
14	Scales Mound Historic District	Scales Mound Historic District	September 5, 1990 (#90001199)	Roughly bounded by the village limits 42°28′55″N 90°15′10″W	Scales Mound	
15	Townsend House	Townsend House	May 17, 2005 (#05000111)	117 N. Canyon Park Rd. 42°22′26″N 90°03′03″W	Stockton	
16	Warren Commercial Historic District	Warren Commercial Historic District	November 7, 1995 (#95001241)	102-165 E. Main St., 204-210 E. Bunett, 102-108 S. Railroad; 42°29′45″N 89°59′15″W	Warren	
17	Elihu Benjamin Washburne House	Elihu Benjamin Washburne House	July 5, 1973 (#73000708)	908 3rd St. 42°24′50″N 90°25′54″W	Galena	
18	Charles Wenner House	Charles Wenner House	August 22, 1984 (#84001073)	Rocky Rd. 42°27′40″N 90°24′39″W	Galena	
19	W.E. White Building	W.E. White Building	November 7, 1997 (#97001339)	100 N. Main St. 42°21′00″N 90°00′24″W	Stockton	

== See also ==
- List of National Historic Landmarks in Illinois
- National Register of Historic Places listings in Illinois
