= Warren Historic District =

Warren Historic District or Warren Commercial Historic District may refer to:

in the United States (by state)

- Warren Commercial Historic District (Warren, Illinois), listed on the NRHP in Jo Daviess County, Illinois
- Warren-Prentis Historic District, Detroit, Michigan, listed on the NRHP
- Warren Commercial Historic District (Warren, Ohio), listed on the NRHP in Trumbull County, Ohio
- Warren Historic District (Warren, Pennsylvania), listed on the NRHP in Pennsylvania
- Warren Waterfront Historic District, Warren, Rhode Island, listed on the NRHP in Rhode Island
- Warren Village Historic District, Warren, Vermont, listed on the NRHP in Washington County, Vermont
- Andrew Warren Historic District, Wausau, Wisconsin, listed on the NRHP in Wisconsin

== See also ==
- Warrenton Historic District (disambiguation)
