= Warren Commercial Historic District =

Warren Commercial Historic District may refer to:

- Warren Commercial Historic District (Warren, Illinois), listed on the National Register of Historic Places in Jo Daviess County, Illinois
- Warren Commercial Historic District (Warren, Ohio), listed on the National Register of Historic Places in Trumbull County, Ohio
