= Charles Wenner House =

Historic house in Illinois, United States

- U.S. National Register of Historic Places
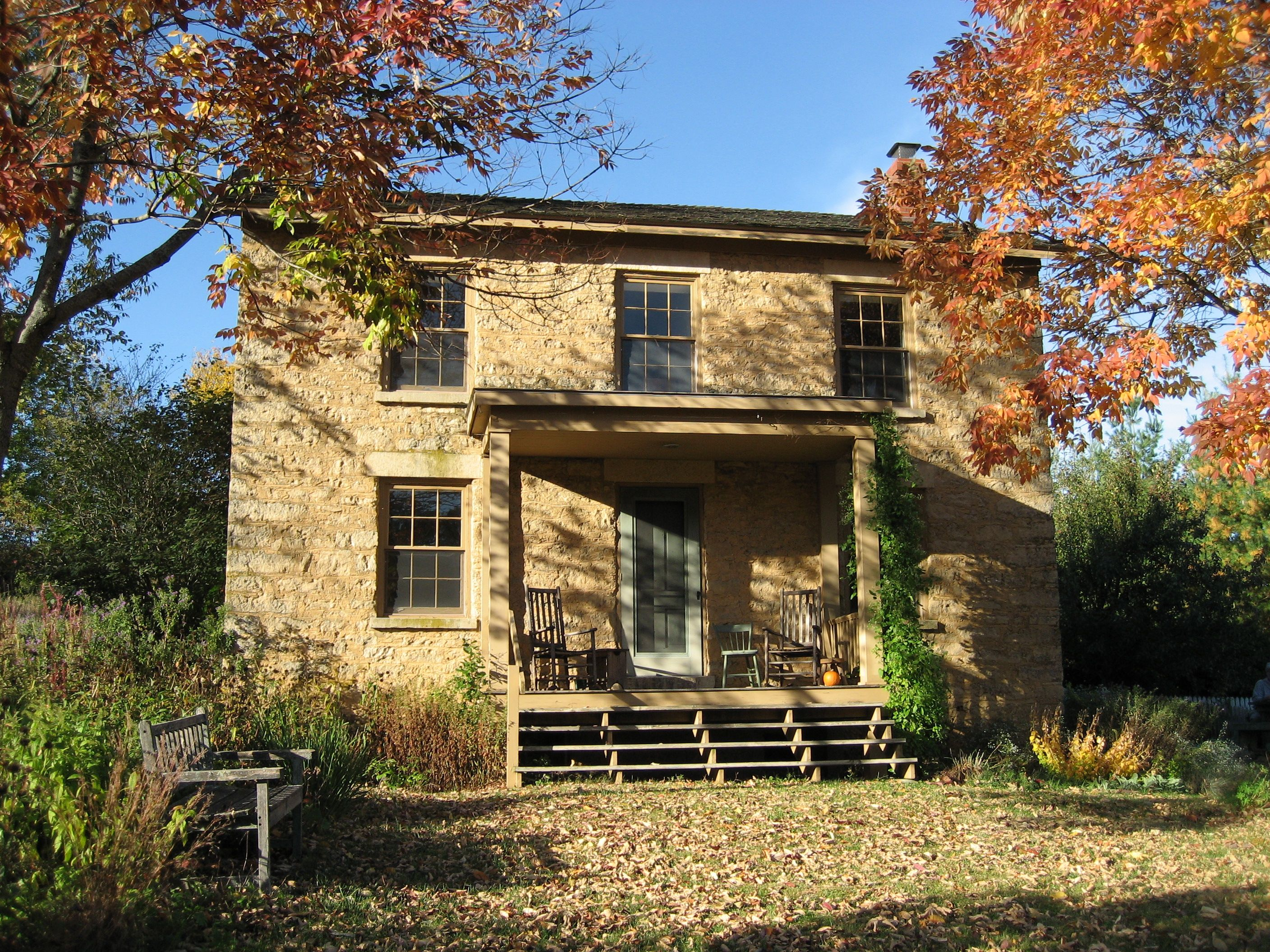
- A 2006 photo

- Location within Illinois Location within the United States
- Nearest city: Galena, Illinois
- Coordinates: 42°27′40″N 90°24′39″W
- Area: less than one acre
- Built: 1854; 172 years ago
- Built by: Charles Wenner
- NRHP reference No.: 84001073
- Added to NRHP: August 22, 1984

The Charles Wenner House is an historic house located near Galena, Illinois, in the United States. It was listed on the National Register of Historic Places in 1984. The house is significant for its connection to European settlers who arrived in the area in the mid-19th century to work the lead mines near Galena.

The Wenner house had been vacant for thirty years by 1984, it had been used as a corn crib in 1954.

== See also ==
- National Register of Historic Places listings in Jo Daviess County, Illinois
