= Ulysses S. Grant Home =

Historic house in Illinois, United States

- U.S. National Register of Historic Places
- U.S. National Historic Landmark
- U.S. Historic district – Contributing property
- Illinois State Historic Site
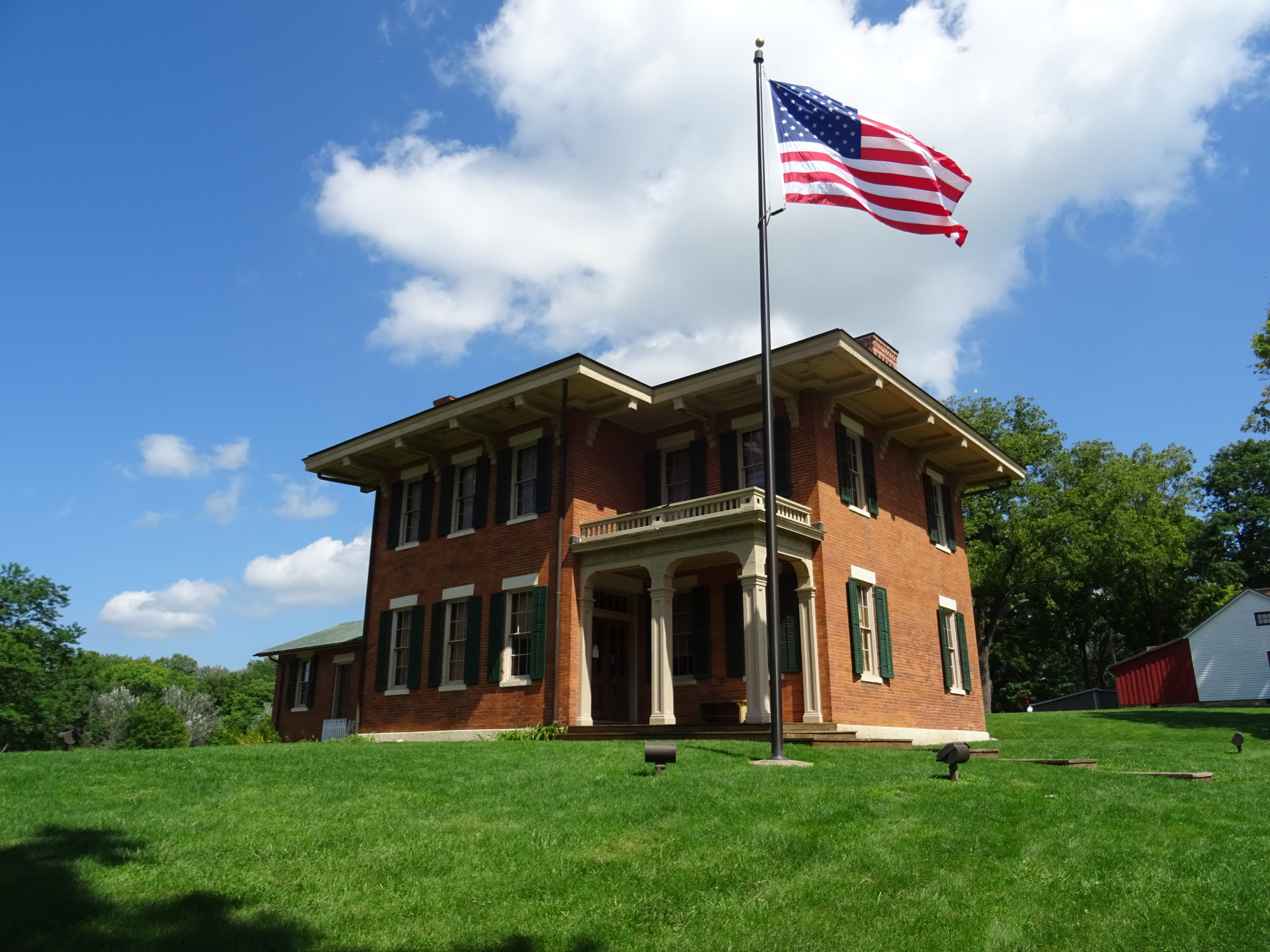

- Location within Illinois Location within the United States
- Interactive map showing the location of the Grant House
- Location: 511 Bouthillier St., Galena, Illinois
- Coordinates: 42.411222°N 90.424583°W
- Built: 1859-60
- Architect: William Dennison
- Architectural style: Italianate
- Part of: Galena Historic District (ID69000056)
- NRHP reference No.: 66000322

Significant dates
- Added to NRHP: October 15, 1966
- Designated NHL: December 19, 1960
- Designated CP: October 18, 1969

The Ulysses S. Grant Home in Galena, Illinois, is the former home of Ulysses S. Grant, the Civil War general and later the 18th president of the United States. The home was designed by William Dennison and constructed in 1859 - 1860. The home was given to Grant by residents of Galena in 1865 as thanks for his war service, and has been maintained as a memorial to Grant since 1904.

== History ==
The house was originally built as the residence of Alexander J. Jackson. It was then purchased by a group of prominent local Republicans (including Elihu B. Washburne), whereupon it was presented to Grant. Grant and his family lived there during his 1868 presidential campaign and again for a few periods during his presidency and retirement. He last visited the home in 1880.

== Architecture ==
The house was designed in the Italianate style by William Dennison. Typical of buildings done in that style, the home featured well defined rectangular shapes, a roof with a low pitch, balustraded balconies extending out over covered porches, and projecting eaves.

== Historic recognition ==
Located on Bouthillier Street, the U.S. Grant Home State Historic Site is owned by the state of Illinois and managed by the Illinois Historic Preservation Agency as a historic house museum with rooms furnished to represent a mid-1860s appearance. Many of the furnishings belonged to the Grant family. Information is given about Grant's activities during the Civil War up through his presidency. An adjacent building houses exhibits about Grant and the history of the home.

The Grant Home was designated a National Historic Landmark on December 19, 1960, and added to the National Register of Historic Places on October 15, 1966, upon that program's inception. The Grant House also lies within the Galena Historic District, designated in 1969. The district has more than 1,000 contributing properties.

== Gallery ==
Ulysses S. Grant home interiors
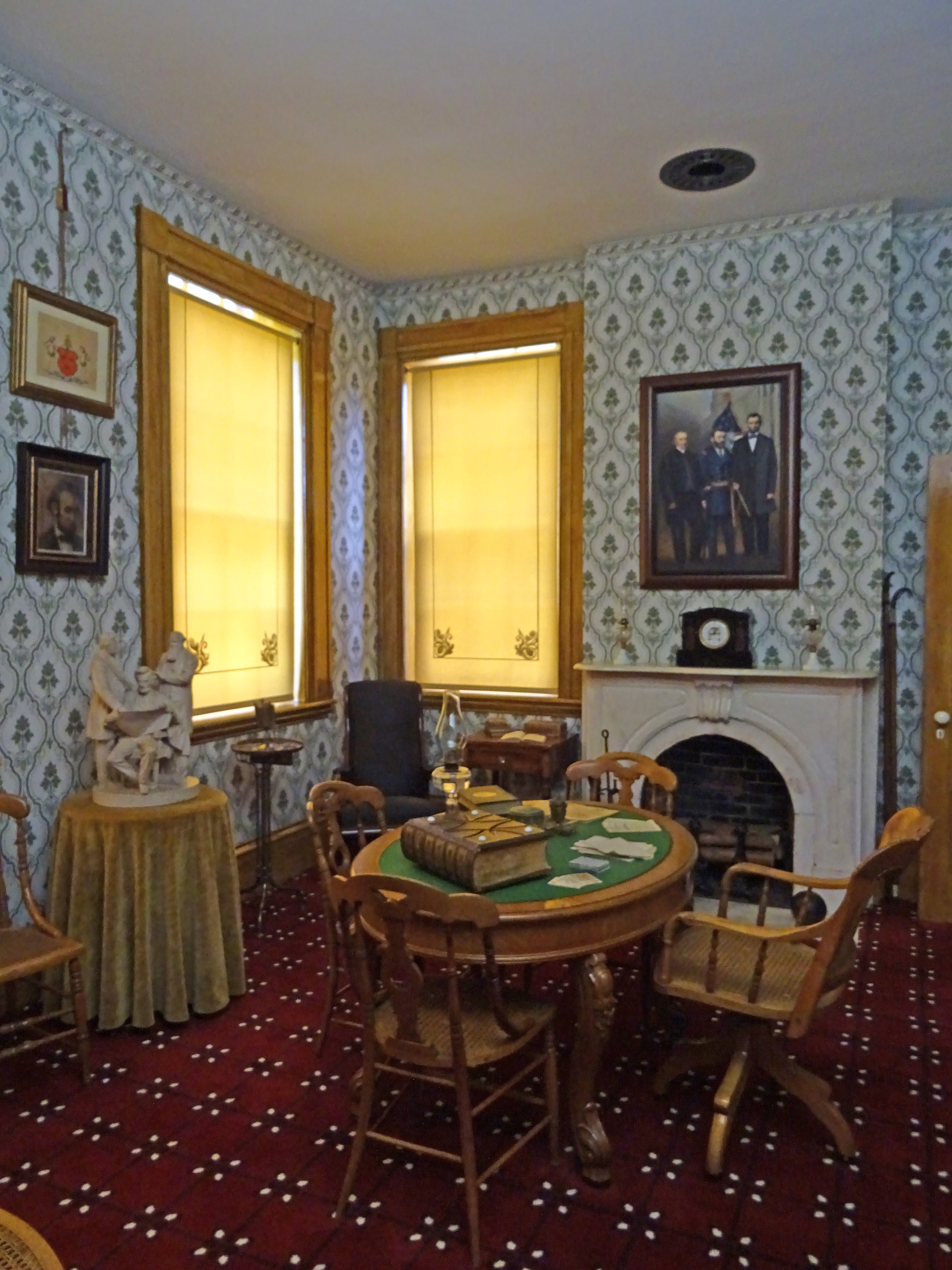
The small sitting room.

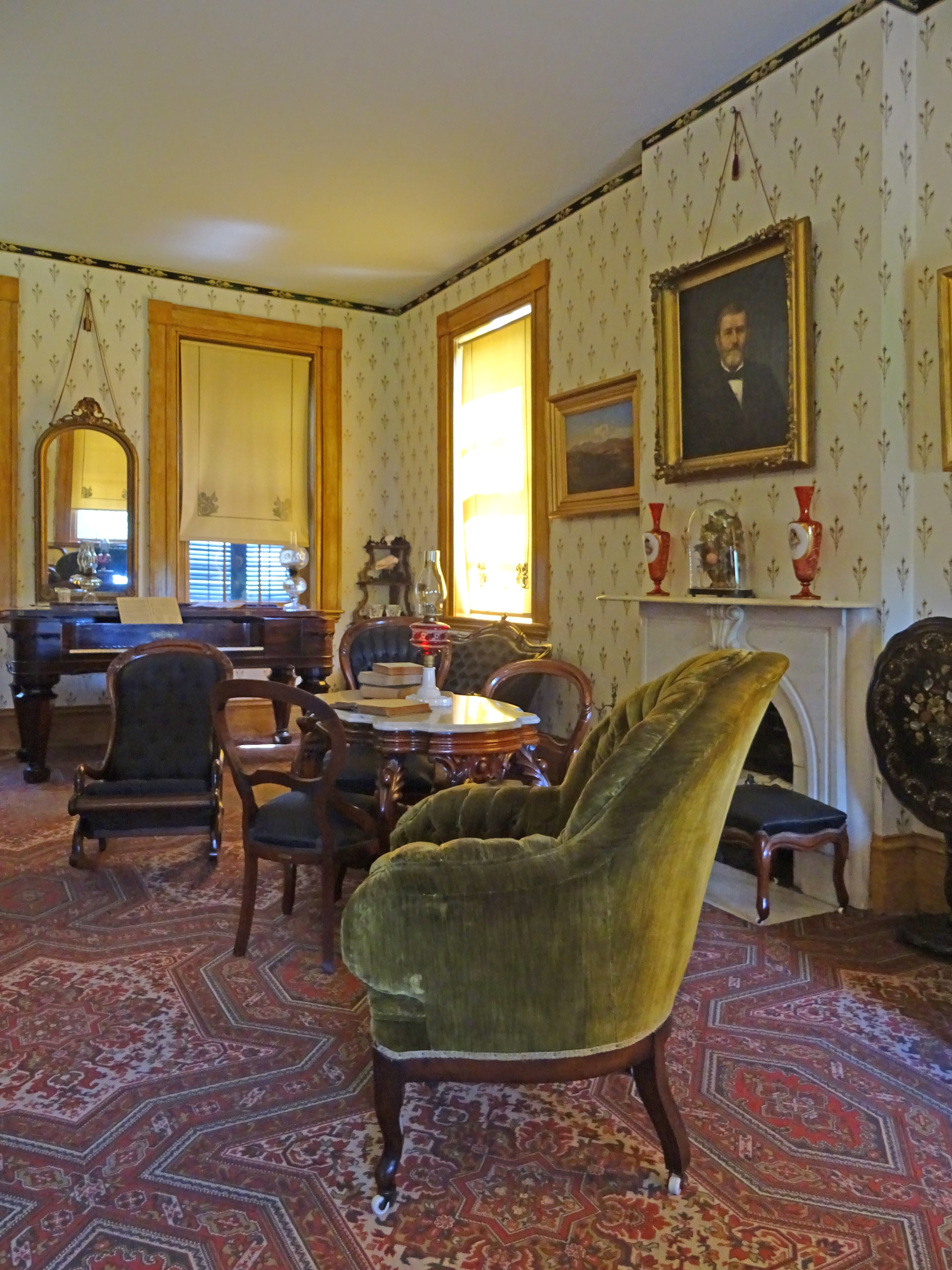
The grand sitting room.

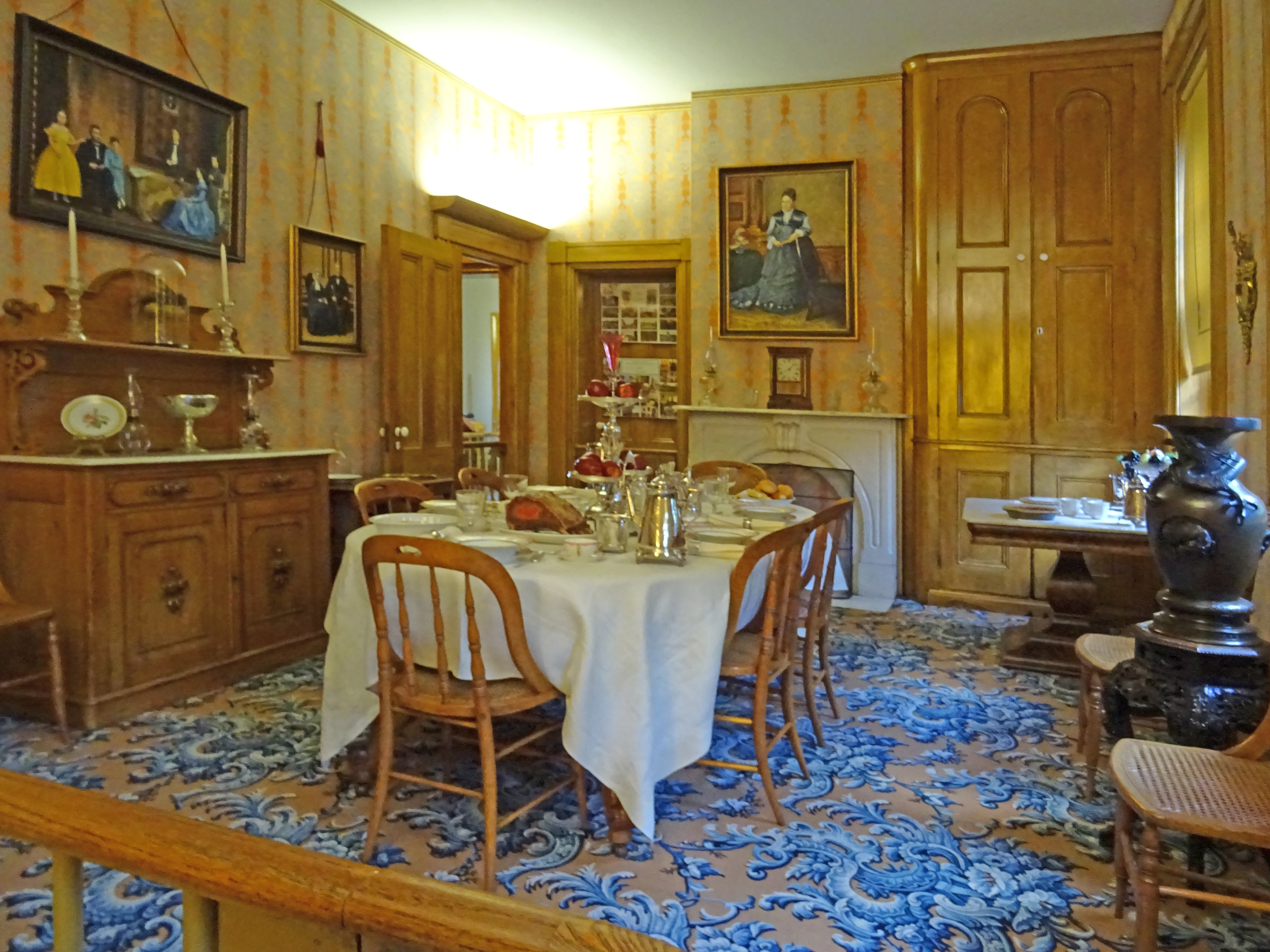
The dining room.

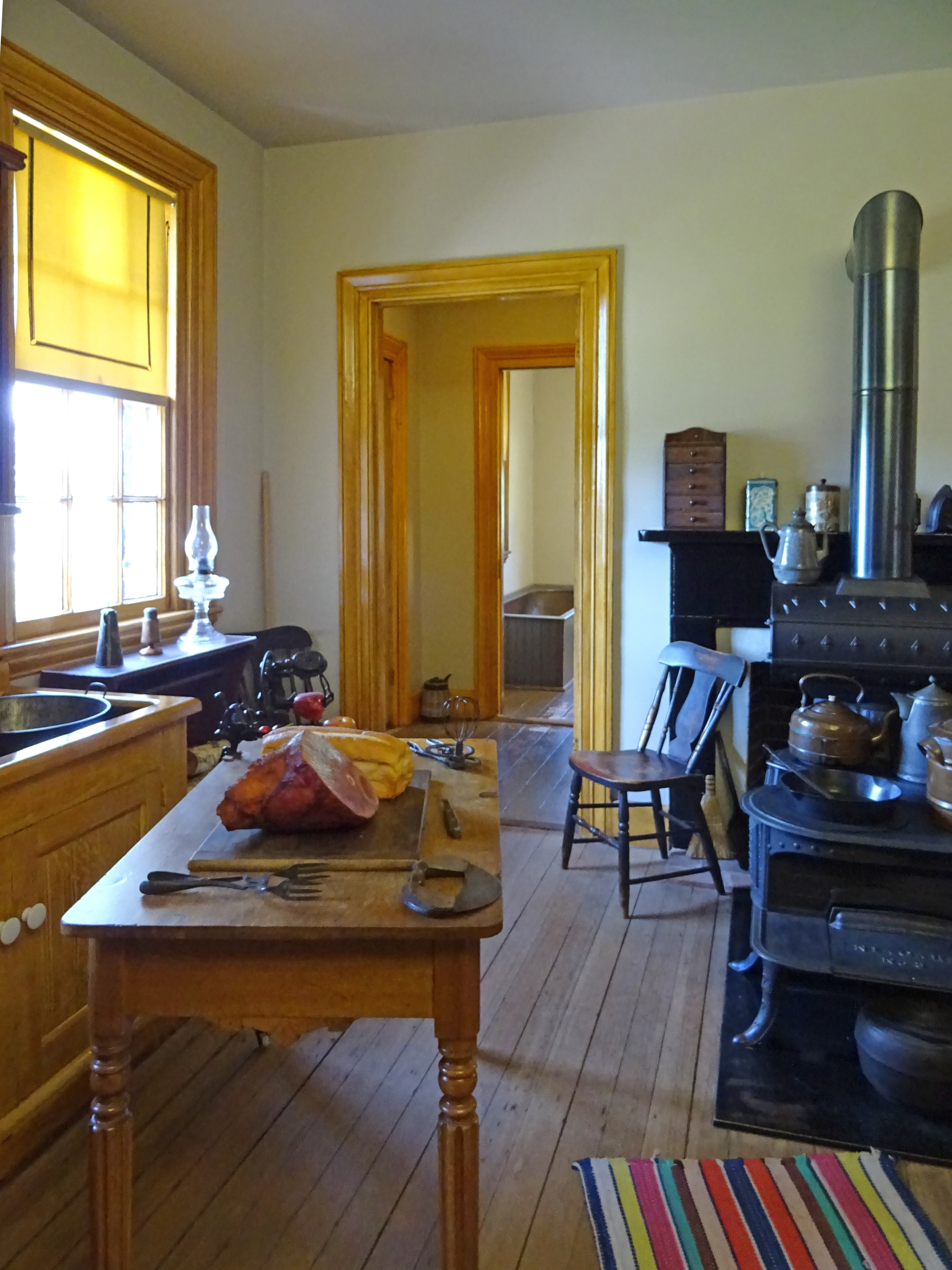
The kitchen and bathroom.

== See also ==
- Elihu Benjamin Washburne House
- Ulysses S. Grant National Historic Site, earlier home near St. Louis
- General Grant National Memorial (Grant's tomb)
- Grant Cottage State Historic Site, Mt. McGregor, New York
- Grant Boyhood Home, Georgetown, Ohio
- Grant Birthplace, Point Pleasant, Ohio
- List of residences of presidents of the United States
