= Charles E. Byrum =

American politician

Member of the South Dakota House of Representatives
- In office 1927–1932

Personal details
- Born: September 20, 1868 Stockton, Illinois, U.S.
- Died: March 3, 1975 (aged 106)
- Party: Republican

Charles E. Byrum (September 20, 1868 – March 3, 1975) was an American politician. He served as a Republican member of the South Dakota House of Representatives.

== Life and career ==
Born in Stockton, Illinois, Byrum served in the South Dakota House of Representatives from 1927 to 1932. He died on March 3, 1975, at the age of 106.
