= Dowling House (Galena, Illinois) =

Historic house in Illinois, United States

- U.S. Historic district – Contributing property
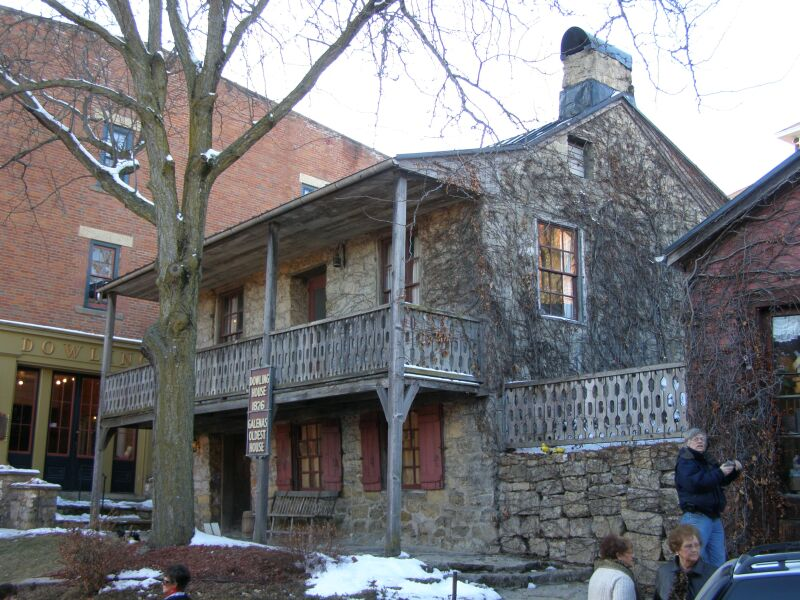

- Location within Illinois Location within the United States
- Interactive map showing the location of Dowling House
- Location: 220 Diagonal Street, Galena, Illinois
- Coordinates: 42°25′2″N 90°25′37″W
- Built: 1826–27
- Architectural style: Single-pen
- Part of: Galena Historic District (ID69000056)
- Designated CP: October 18, 1969

The Dowling House is the oldest building in Galena, Illinois, United States, now a historic house museum.

== History ==
John Dowling arrived in Galena with his son Nicholas in 1826. The limestone house was built in 1826–27 in the single-pen style. The first floor was used as a trading post while the Dowlings lived upstairs. Dowling was an important early resident of Galena. He served on the 1834 fire committee and was elected to the 1838 town board of trustees. He also sold the county a plot of land for its first court house. Nicholas was elected alderman in 1841, serving until his election as mayor in 1843. Though he resigned after only a few months, he was again elected to the office in 1851, serving for two years.

The building sat abandoned for several decades, It was rehabilitated by William McCauley in the 1960s. In the 1970s, the building was opened to the public. Thirty minute tours of the building, furnished with period supplies and furnishings, are now offered from May to November. It was recognized as a contributing property to the Galena Historic District on October 18, 1969.
