= Galena Historic District =

Historic district in Illinois, United States

- U.S. National Register of Historic Places
- U.S. Historic district
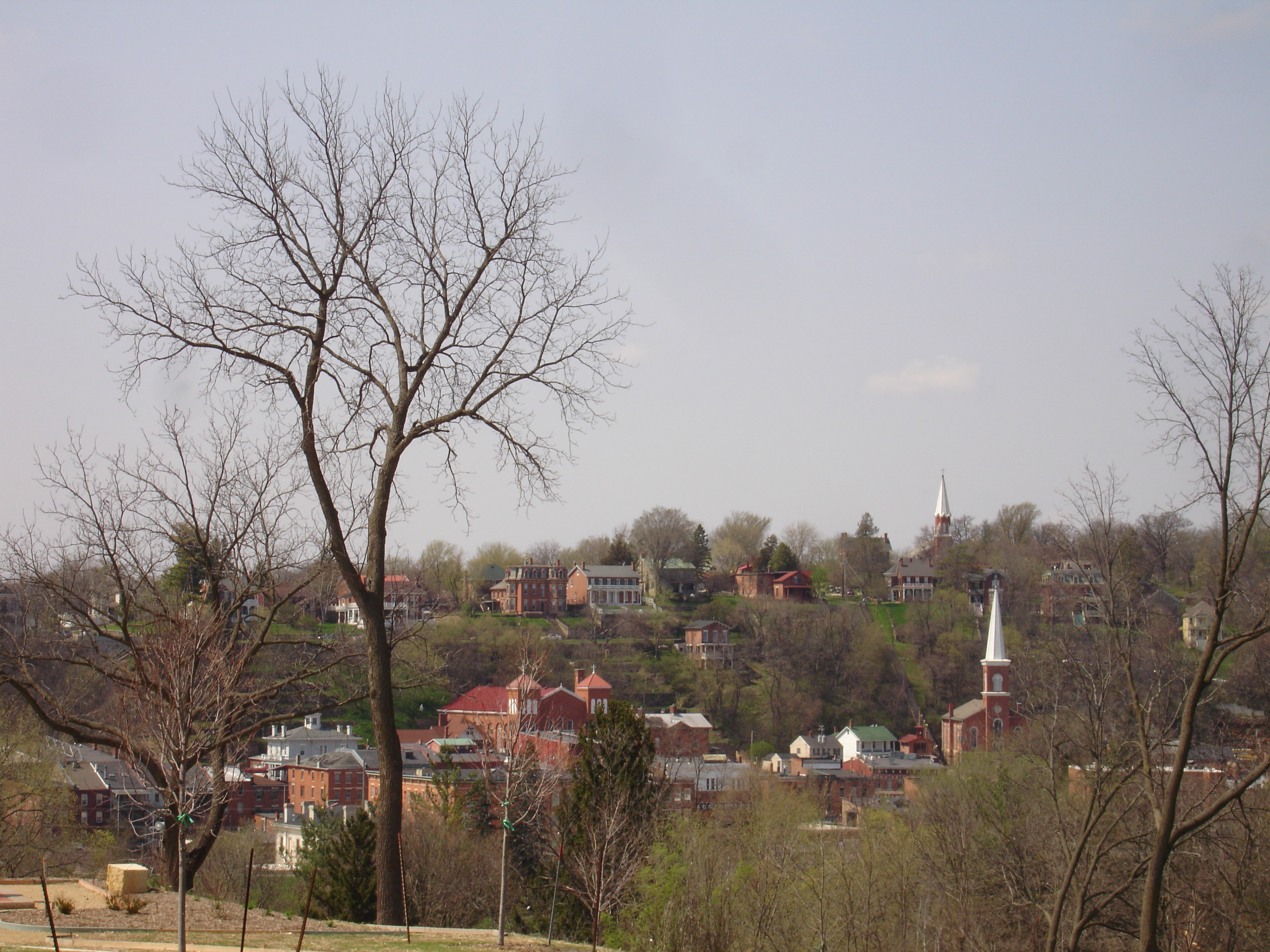
- The heart of the district, viewed from U.S. Grant's Home

- Location within Illinois Location within the United States
- Interactive map showing Galena Historic District
- Location: Roughly bounded by Davis Cr., 4th, 5th, Adams, Field, Wann, N. Dodge, Fulton, N. Hickory, Hill, Ridge & Spring Sts., Galena, Illinois
- Coordinates: 42°25′5″N 90°25′53″W
- Built: c. c – c. 1838–1900
- Architectural style: Greek Revival, Late Victorian
- NRHP reference No.: 69000056 (original); 13000854 (increase); 13000854 (decrease)

Significant dates
- Added to NRHP: October 18, 1969
- Boundary increase: October 23, 2013
- Boundary decrease: October 23, 2013

The Galena Historic District is a historic district located in the city of Galena, Illinois, United States. The historic district encompasses 85 percent of the city of Galena and includes more than 800 properties. The downtown area consists of three successive tiers made up of Main, Bench and Prospect Streets. Within the boundaries of the district are such notable homes as the Ulysses S. Grant Home and the Elihu B. Washburne House. The Galena Historic District was added to the U.S. National Register of Historic Places in 1969.

== Boundaries ==
At the time of its nomination to the National Register of Historic Places, the Galena Historic District included over 90 percent of the city. Present-day numbers cited in media reports were more conservative, stating that the district included 85 percent of the city. City ordinance in Galena describes the boundary of the historic district as any area, place, building, structure, work of art of, or other object within the "original city" and all subdivisions added before December 31, 1859.

== History ==
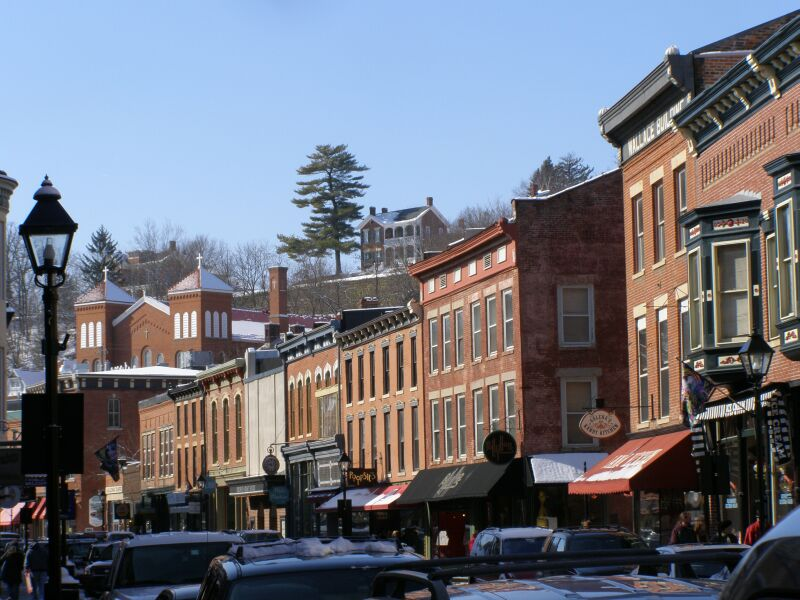
Main Street looking west, Galena, Illinois

Galena's current appearance was primarily influenced by a string of fires that plagued the city during the 1850s. Those fires led city government to prohibit new construction using wood, resulting in a downtown built mostly of brick and stone. Much of Galena's early growth was due to the lead mining industry that sprouted up around lead deposits in the region. By the 1830s, Galena's population had surpassed Chicago, and many city leaders expected Galena to become the leading city in the Midwest. Galena began a long decline in the 1860s as railroads succeeded rivers as the main transportation method and the lead industry suffered falling prices.

By the 1880s, the city of Galena no longer held its former prominence, being surpassed by other river ports, such as Dubuque, Iowa, and passed over by major railroads for other locations, such as East Dubuque, Illinois. The Galena River was no longer easily navigable, and floods, including a serious one in 1937, helped ensure the end of Galena's glory days. Galena's long decline continued through the 1950s; at that time, many of the downtown buildings were dilapidated and boarded up. As the historic preservation movement took hold, Galena became one of the first cities in Illinois to pass a historic preservation ordinance. Galena's historic preservation ordinance was passed in 1965; four years later, the Galena Historic District was listed on the National Register of Historic Places.

== Buildings ==
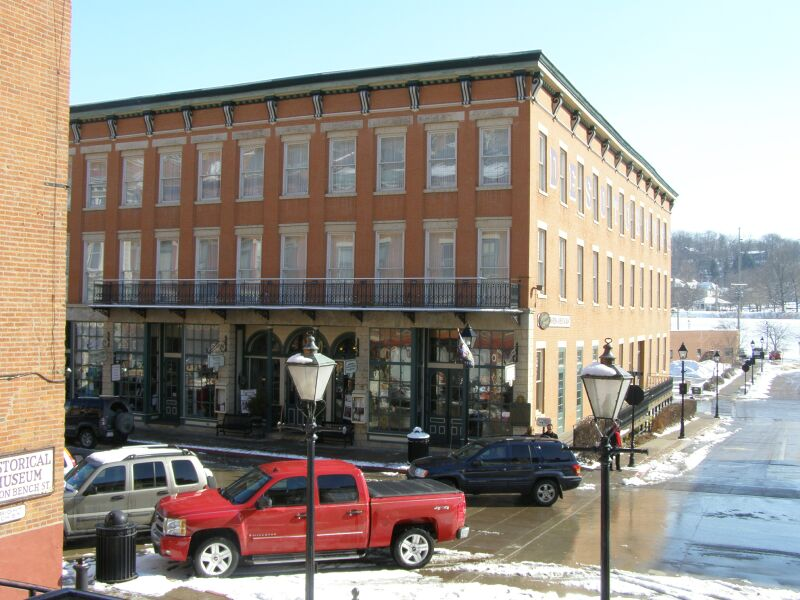
DeSoto House, Main Street

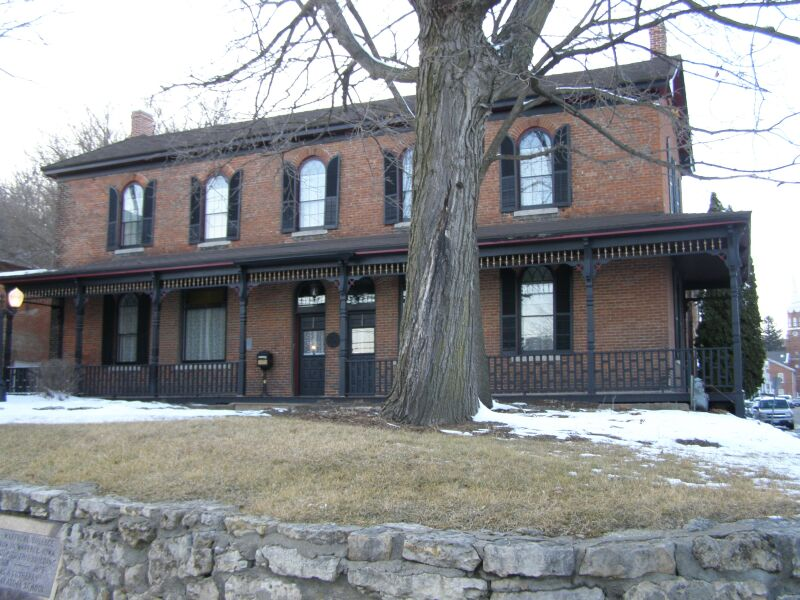
St. Rose Academy, Bench Street

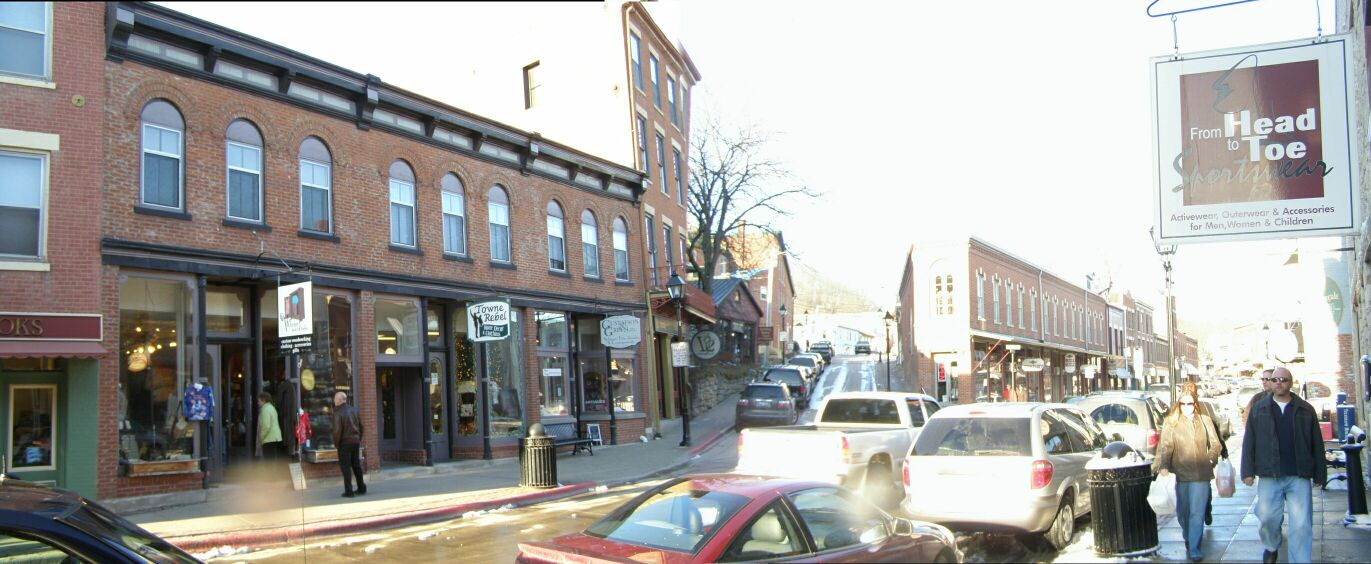
Flatiron Building at Main and Diagonal Streets

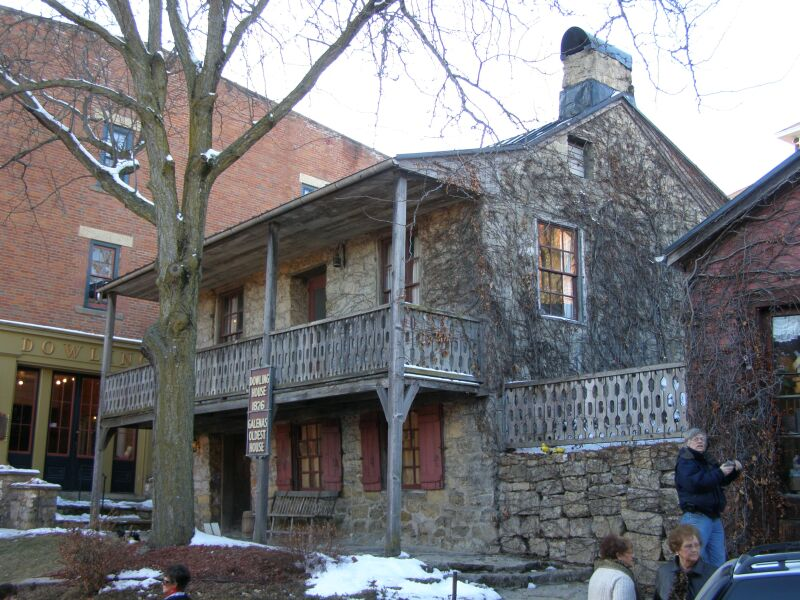
Dowling House (1827), Galena, Illinois

=== General ===
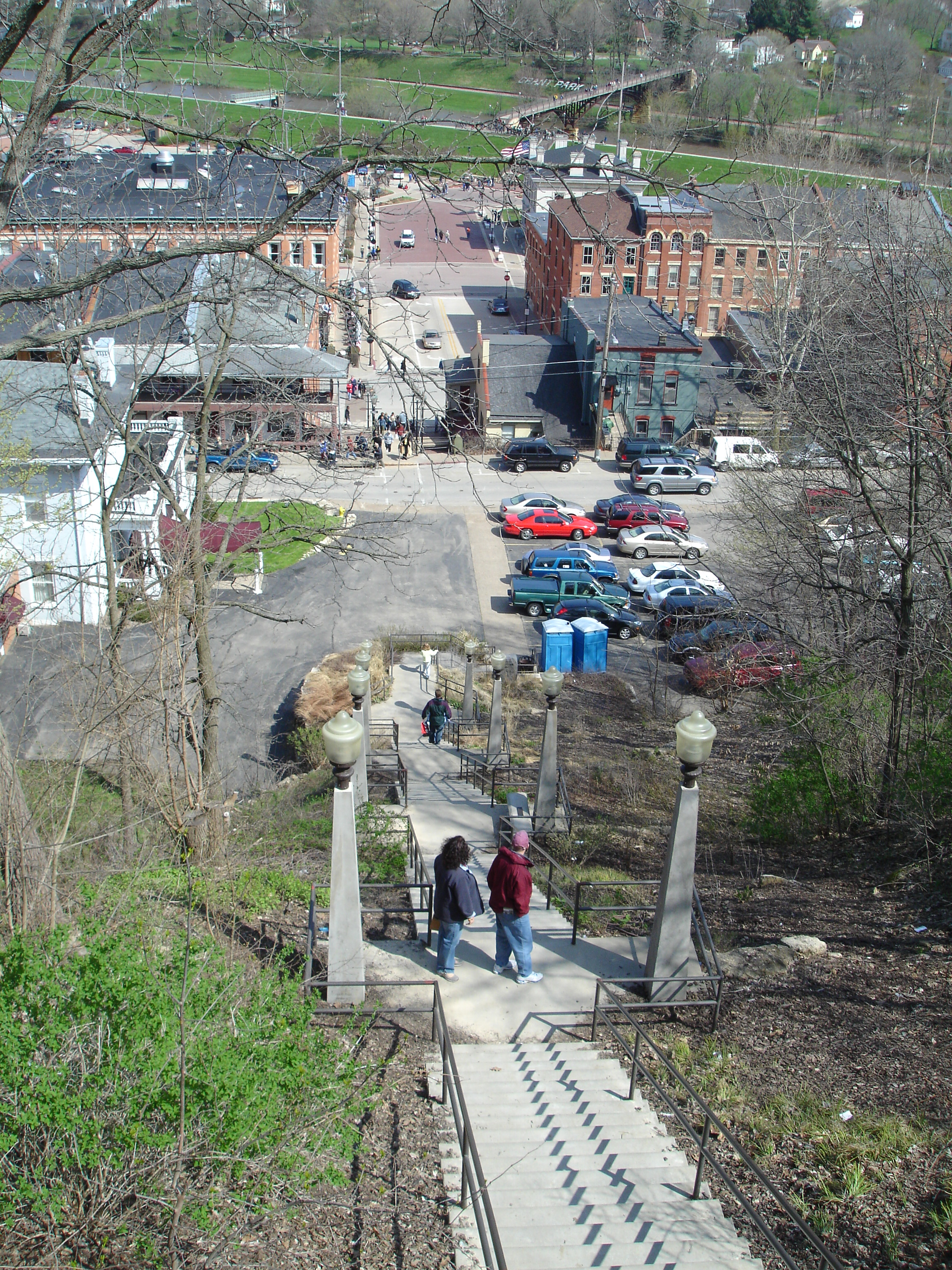
Bench and Main Street viewed from Prospect Street; stairs provide pedestrian access to the high points in downtown.

The Galena Historic District contains more than 1,000 buildings constructed before 1900 that are considered contributing properties. The center of downtown Galena is laid out in three parallel segmental tiers starting at Main Street closest to the river. Beyond Main Street, and at a higher elevation, are Bench and Prospect Streets. Main Street forms the primary commercial strip through Galena and is lined with buildings two, three, and four stories tall. Most of Main Street's structures are built of red brick and cast in Federal style of the simple commercial style of the 1840s.

On Bench Street, most of the buildings are public or fraternal buildings, among them some of the district's principal churches. Viewed from the levee or the railroad tracks, the church steeples crown downtown. Backdropping the prominent church steeples of Bench Street is the wooded terrace of Prospect Street. Prospect Street is mostly residential with the large old high school and its clock tower being the evident exception. Northwest of Prospect Street the residential area continues. Many of the private homes in this area date from Galena's early days. The concentration of 19th-century homes, both beyond Prospect Street and on the opposite side of the Galena River, was labeled "astonishing" in the National Register nomination document.

=== Individual structures ===
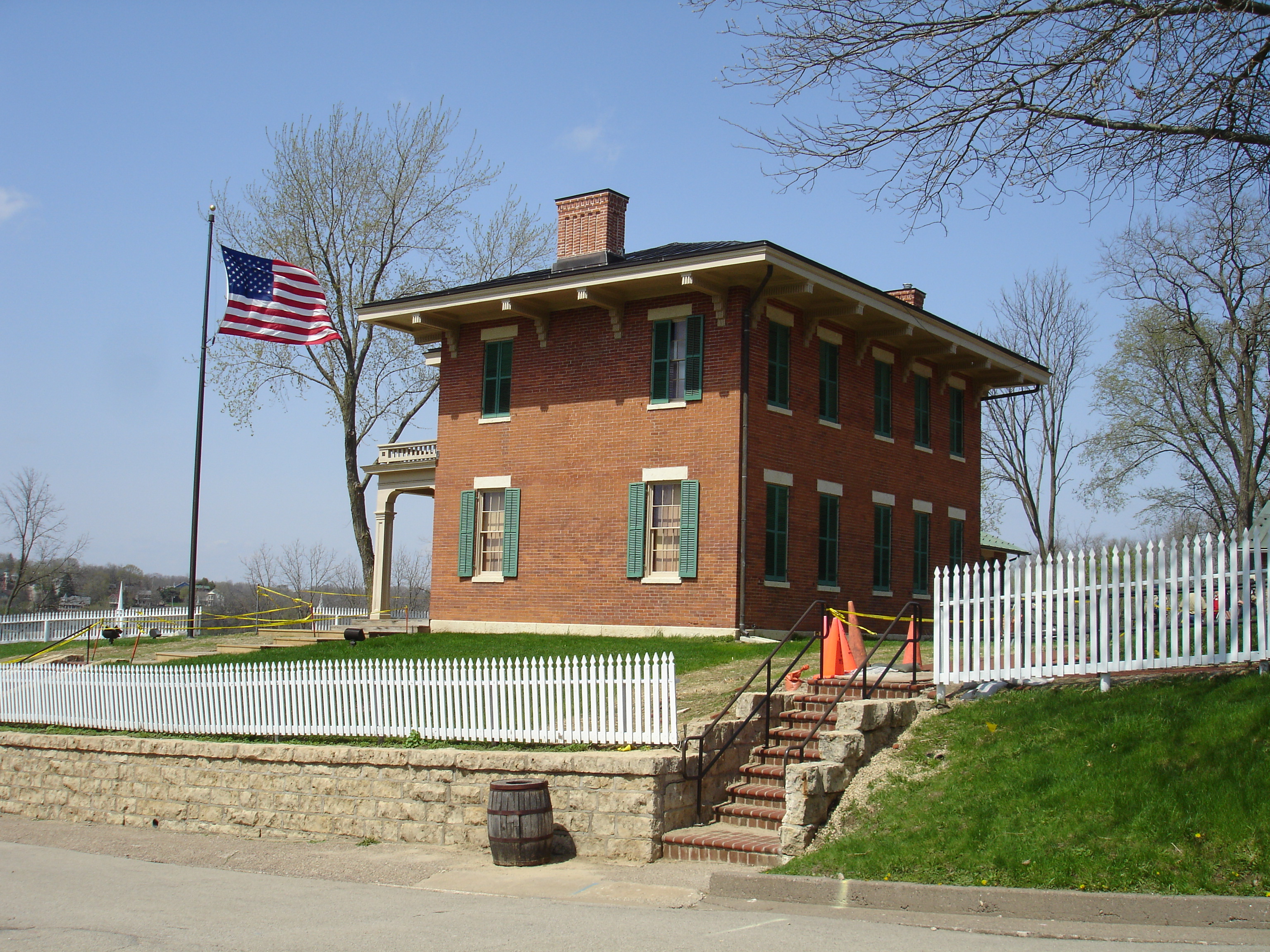
Ulysses S. Grant Home, a National Historic Landmark

Within the boundaries of the Galena Historic District are three structures that are listed on the National Register of Historic Places in their own right. The Ulysses S. Grant Home is a declared National Historic Landmark, and the Elihu B. Washburne House and Old Market House enjoy listings on the National Register. Aside from those structures, many buildings dating to the early history of Galena and Illinois are included within the district.

The DeSoto House Hotel, on Main Street, opened in April 1855 and is reported as the oldest operating hotel in Illinois. Like many hotels, the DeSoto played host to important and prominent guests of its day; individuals such as Theodore Roosevelt, William Jennings Bryan, and Ralph Waldo Emerson all passed through its doors. Abraham Lincoln once spoke from the hotel balcony as well. Today the hotel has 55 rooms, two dining rooms and a tavern.

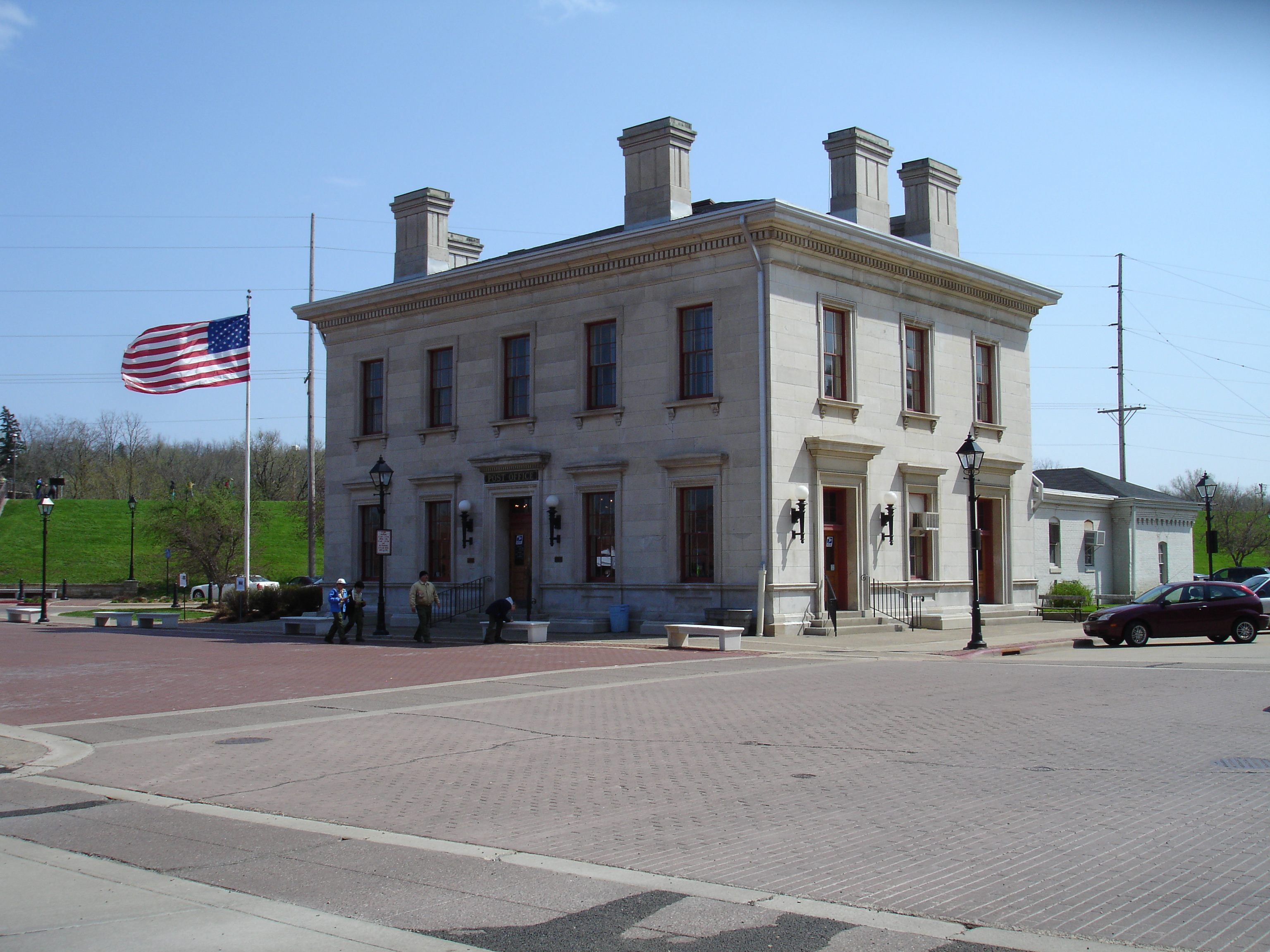
Galena Customs House & U.S. Post Office, said to be the longest operating U.S. Post Office

Just off Main Street, at Green and Commerce Streets, is the historic Galena Customs House and U.S. Post Office. The building is a superior example of Federal style architecture. It was constructed in 1858 and originally served as the Galena Customs House before finding use as the U.S. Post Office, its current function.

Even amidst the public buildings of Bench Street are examples of some of the fine mansions constructed around Galena, each an integral part of the historic district in its own right. The John Dowling House is one such mansion, cast in the Classical Revival style, the Dowling House was built within the grounds of the stockade constructed here during the Black Hawk War. The 1847 Dowling House was surveyed as part of the Historic American Buildings Survey in 1934.

== Architecture ==
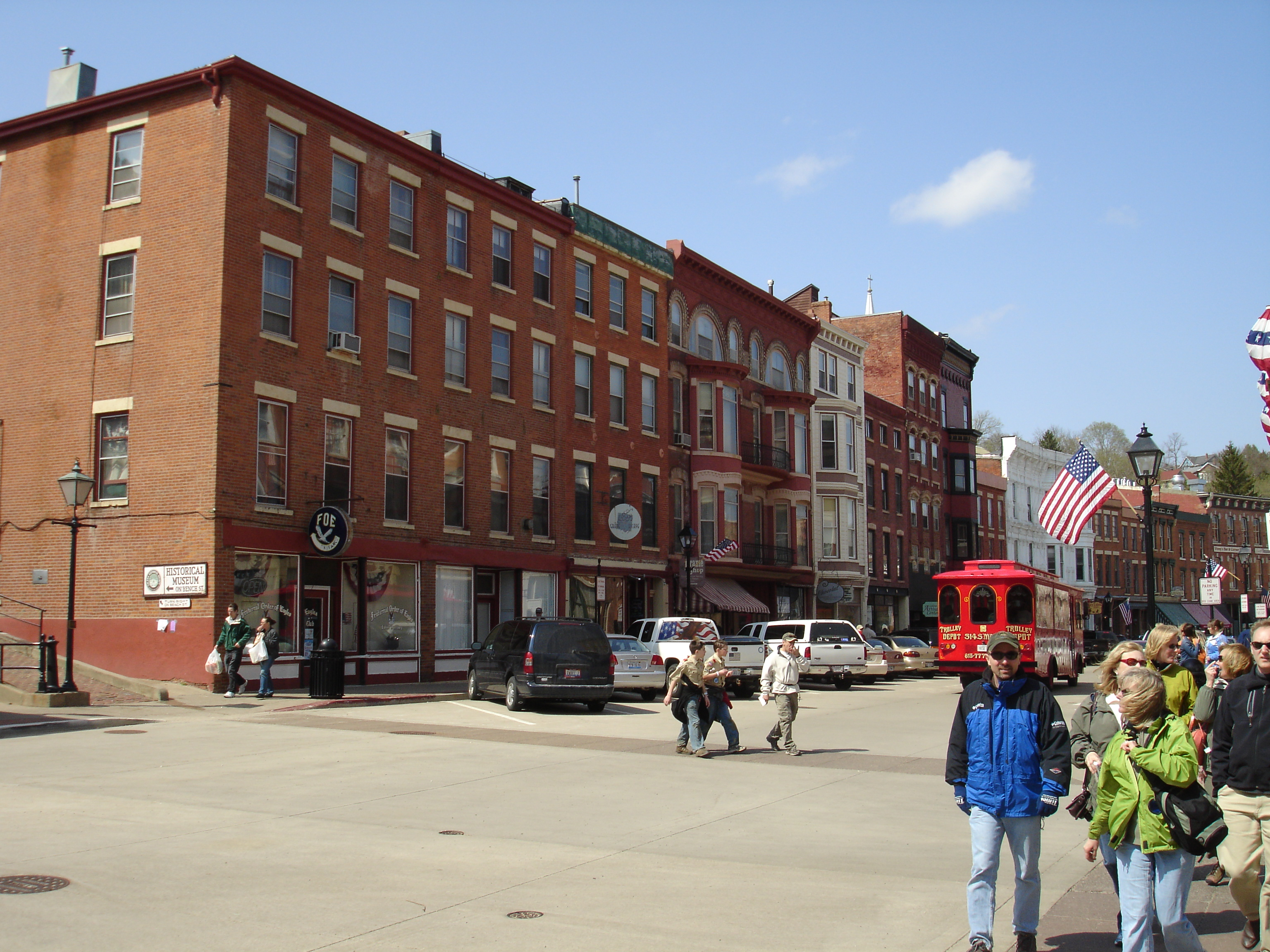
The commercial buildings of Main Street present an unusual architectural harmony.

The architectural styles present in the Galena Historic District vary according to the time period during which the structures were built. Styles ranging from simple commercial-style buildings of the 1820s up through the Greek Revival, Italianate, Gothic Revival and later Victorian styles are all represented within the historic district. The area is home to some of the finest Greek Revival architecture in the United States.

The buildings lining Main Street present a unique architectural unity. The bend of Main Street, which approximately follows the course of the Galena River, enhances the spatial character of the street and is a feature that is rare in American towns and cities. Past Main Street, upon the bluffs and facing Prospect Street, are huge mansions built from 1840–90. The homes, built by mostly mine owners and steamboat captains, range from a hodge-podge of architectural styles to distinct stylistic representations of the period.

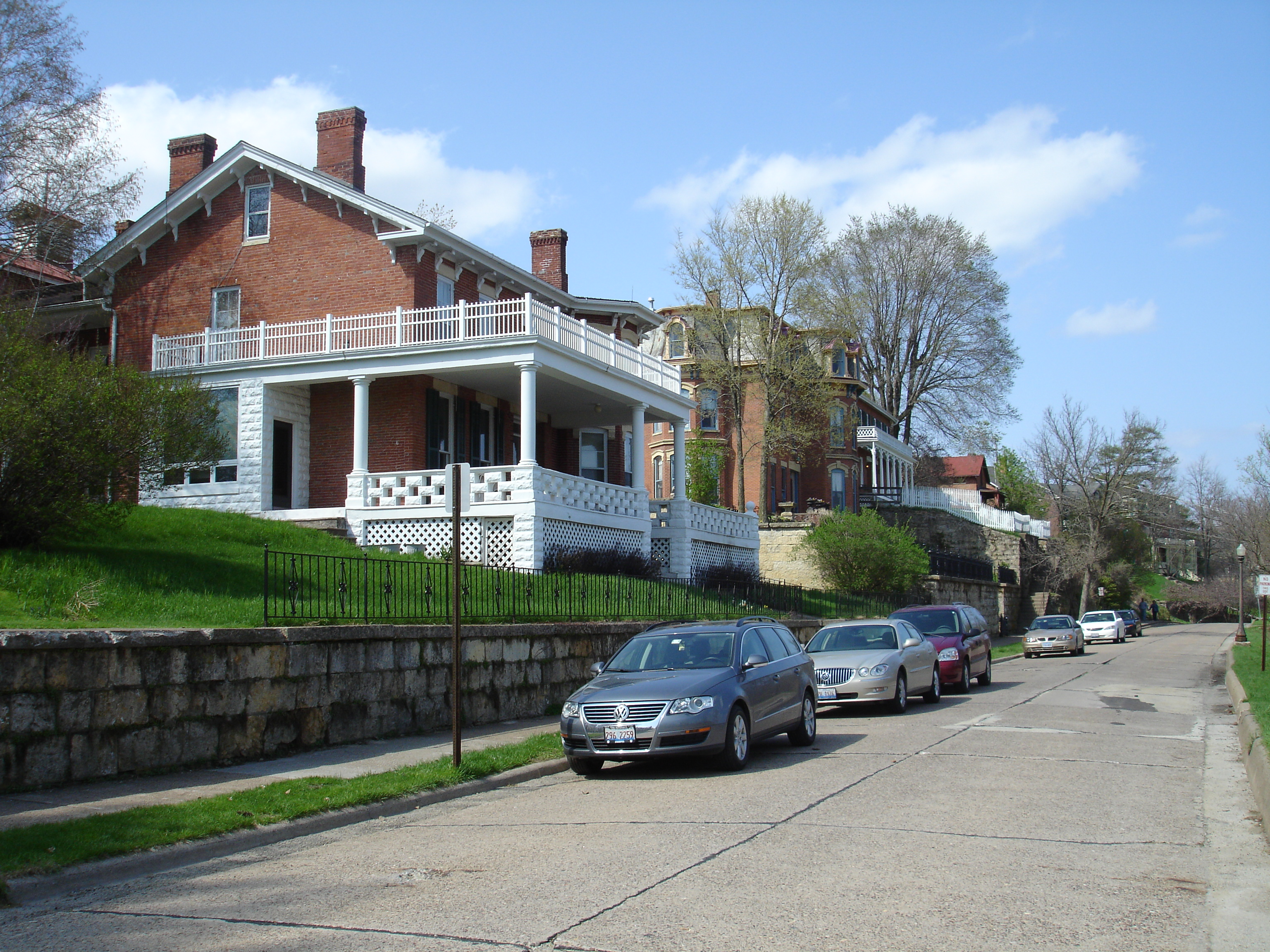
Prospect Street is lined with multiple intact 19th Century mansions.

Because of its unique period architecture, Galena has earned various nicknames. The city has been called the "outdoor museum of the Victorian Midwest" and variations on "the town that time forgot." Depending on the commentator Galena's best architectural attractions are found either on Main Street in the downtown area or in the surrounding bluffs which are dotted with 19th-century mansions.

== Historic significance ==
Galena's 1858 population stood at 14,000 before the city began an era of significant decline. Many of the buildings, however, survived the ensuing time period, though in a much dilapidated state. Galena was important to the early development of the Upper Midwest, and today the town retains much of its 19th-century character. A stroll through the streets of Galena, especially during the early morning when crowds are not present, envelops one in the sights and sense of a bygone era. Galena is closely connected with its era of urban prosperity and grace that have long since been eliminated by industrialization in most American towns.

The Galena Historic District was listed on the U.S. National Register of Historic Places on October 18, 1969. The National Register nomination cited the historic district's significance in multiple areas including, agriculture, mining, art and military as its reasons for its listing.

== As a tourist destination ==
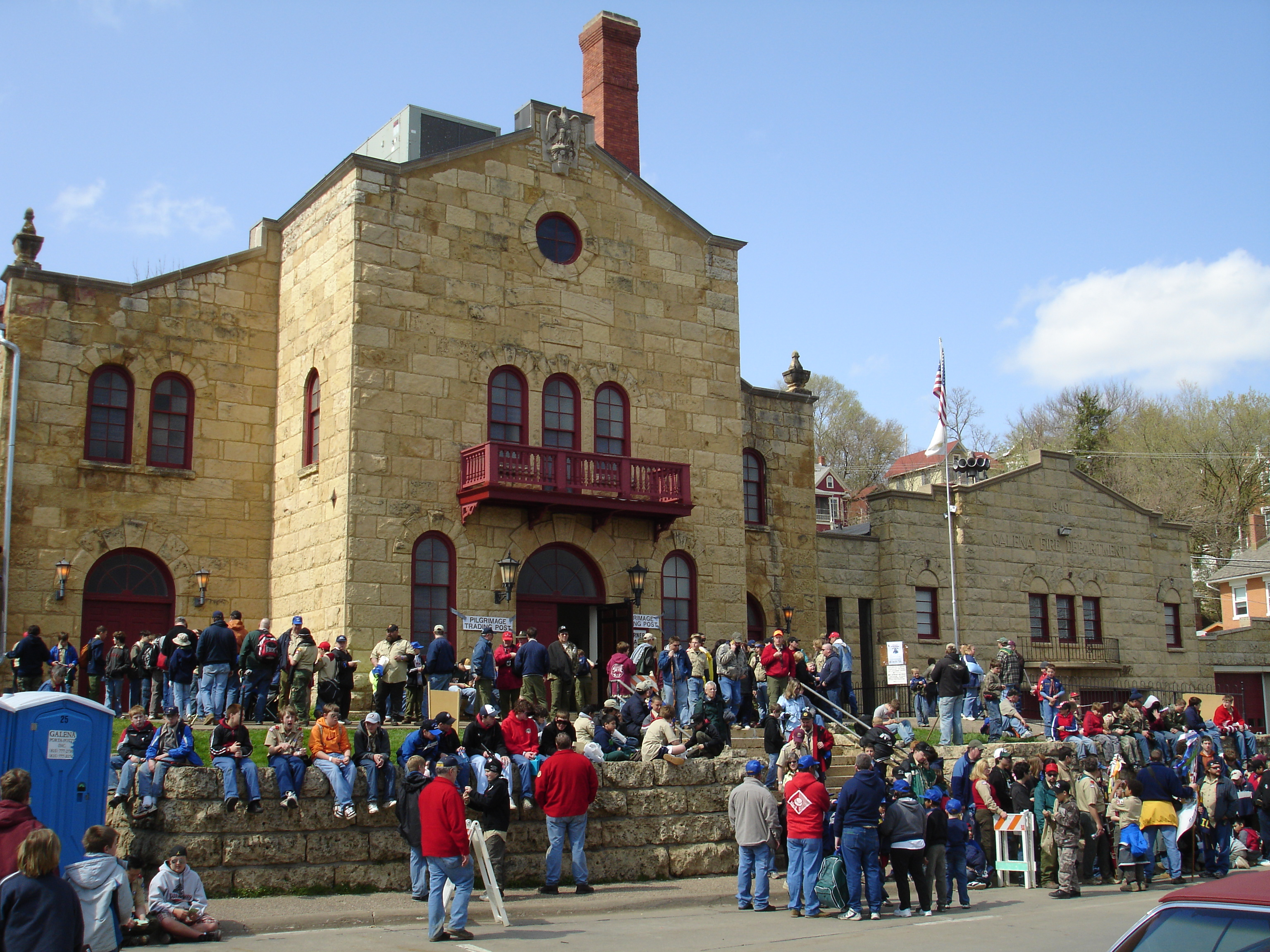
Galena hosts more than 1 million visitors annually, among them these Boy Scouts on their Ulysses S. Grant Pilgrimage.

The city of Galena hosts more than one million visitors annually. The exact number of visitors varies, depending upon the source of the estimate and the year it was made. The New York Times cited "more than a million" visitors in 2002, as did the Smithsonian magazine in 2007. In 2003, a Chicago Tribune article stated 1.3 million as the number of visitors to the city of Galena per year; two years later the same publication estimated 1.4 million annual visitors. The historic district is populated by tourist-driven shops and business, including dozens of bed and breakfast inns. More than a dozen art galleries dot the downtown area, which is also home to numerous restaurants and taverns.

After the Galena Historic District was listed on the National Register, the area began to change. Antique stores sprouted up, according to The New York Times, "like mushrooms after a steady rain." The antique stores have since been replaced. More restaurants and retail shops, many geared toward tourists, are located in the storefronts of downtown Galena. The changes by what some residents and business owners have linked to owners in Chicago have met with mixed reviews. The New York Times reported in 2007 that many long-time Galena residents and second-home owners alike appreciated the shift from antique shops to retail and restaurants. In a 2005 Chicago Tribune article, some residents and business owners lamented the growth of the city as well as the rise in rents instigated by the change in Galena's commercial base.
