= United States Post Office and Customhouse (Galena, Illinois) =

- Galena Post Office and Customhouse
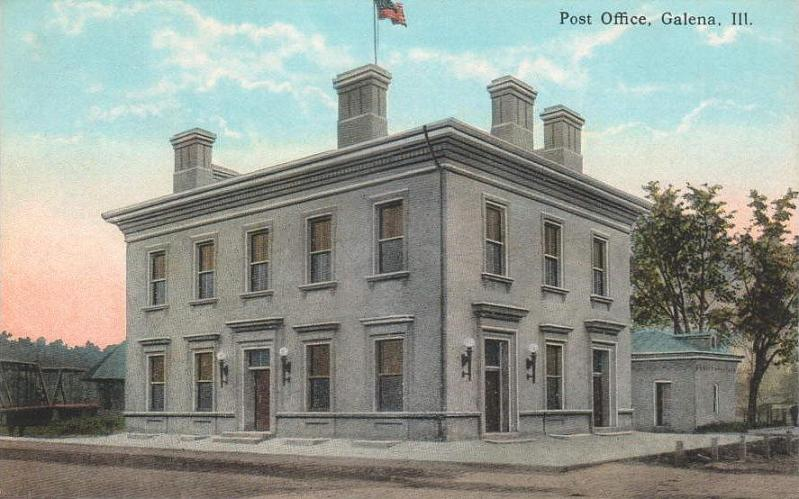
- Pictured around 1912

- Location within Illinois Location within the United States
- Location: 10 Green Street, Galena, Illinois, U.S.
- Coordinates: 42.4141°N 90.4293°W
- Built: 1858 (168 years ago)
- Architectural style: Federal style

The U.S. Post Office and Customhouse in Galena, Illinois, United States, is located on Green Street. Completed in 1858 in the Federal style, it is believed to be the oldest continually operating post office in the United States. It was the first post office to be designated by the Smithsonian Institution as a "Great American Post Office." It was originally the city's custom house.

== See also ==
- List of United States post offices
