= Stockton, Illinois =

Stockton
- Village
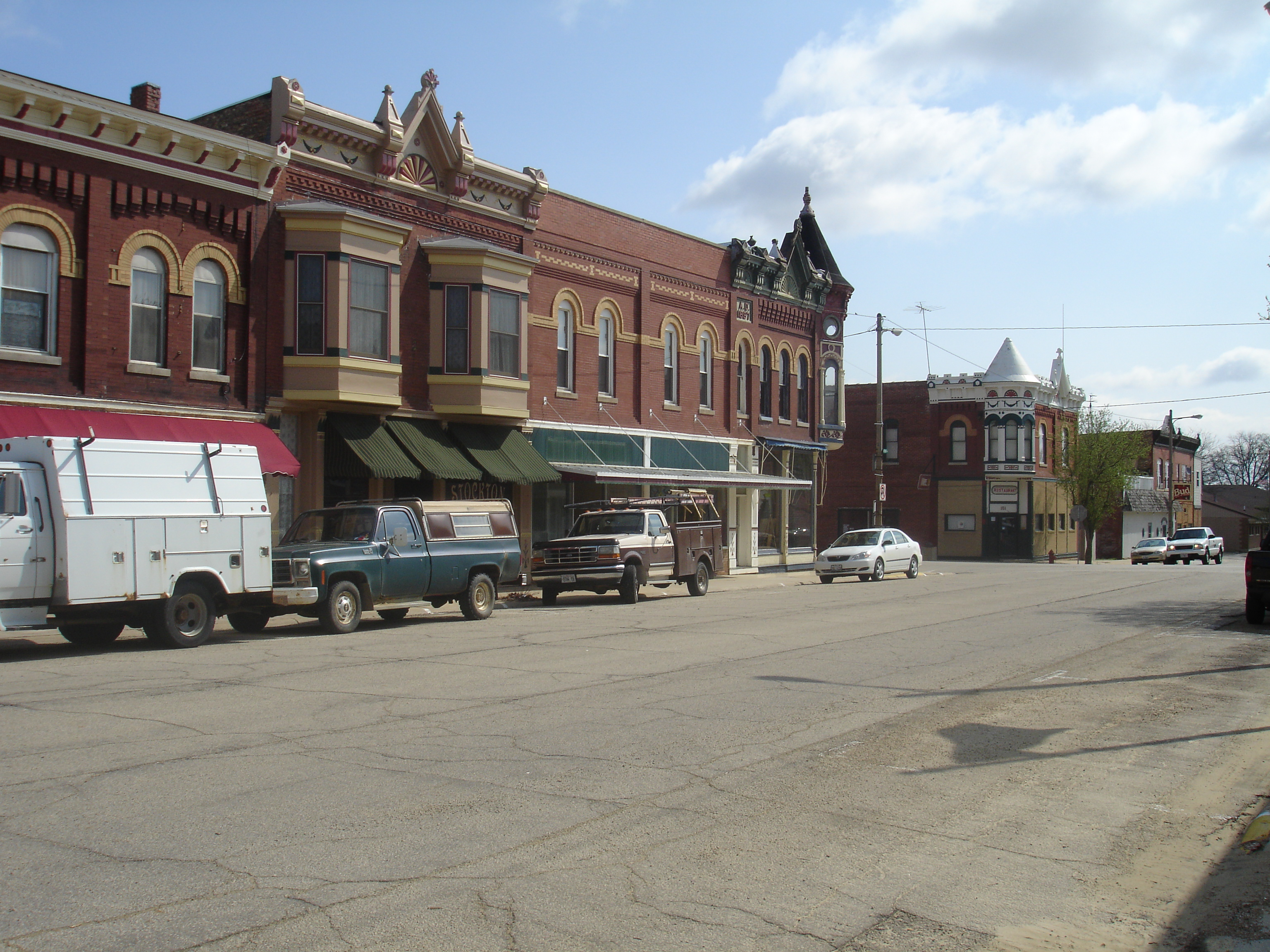
- Downtown Stockton, including the W.E. White Building (near corner)

- Logo
- Nickname: Gateway to Jo Daviess County
- Location of Stockton in Daviess County, Illinois
- Coordinates: 42°21′11″N 89°59′50″W
- Country: United States
- State: Illinois
- County: Jo Daviess
- Township: Stockton

Area
  - Total: 1.88 sq mi (4.86 km^{2})
  - Land: 1.88 sq mi (4.86 km^{2})
  - Water: 0 sq mi (0.00 km^{2})
- Elevation: 974 ft (297 m)

Population (2020)
  - Total: 1,728
  - Density: 920.8/sq mi (355.51/km^{2})
- Time zone: UTC-6 (CST)
  - Summer (DST): UTC-5 (CDT)
- ZIP code: 61085
- Area code: 815
- FIPS code: 17-72780
- GNIS feature ID: 2399905
- Website: Village of Stockton; Stockton Chamber of Commerce

Stockton is a village in Jo Daviess County, Illinois, United States. The population was 1,728 at the 2020 census.

== History ==
The village of Stockton is the youngest village in Jo Daviess County. It was established after the Minnesota Northwestern Railroad decided to build a station in Section 2 of Stockton Township in 1886, which through mergers later became named the Chicago Great Western Railway. The railroad tracks were removed in the early 1970s.

What is now Front Street in Stockton was then a dirt road which served as the main thoroughfare to Lena.

In April 1887, Charles Hermann became Stockton's first business owner.

In 1914, the Kraft Brothers opened a cheese factory in Stockton, and operated it until Kraft sold the facility in 1998. This was the birthplace of the Kraft Corporation and the first cheese plant opened by J.L. Kraft.

== Geography ==
According to the 2021 census gazetteer files, Stockton has a total area of 1.88 square miles (4.87 km^{2}), all land.

=== Climate ===
Climate data for Stockton, Illinois (1991–2020 normals, extremes 1943–present)
Month	Jan	Feb	Mar	Apr	May	Jun	Jul	Aug	Sep	Oct	Nov	Dec	Year
Record high °F (°C)	61 (16)	69 (21)	84 (29)	91 (33)	96 (36)	99 (37)	99 (37)	99 (37)	98 (37)	89 (32)	77 (25)	69 (21)	99 (37)
Mean maximum °F (°C)	46.6 (8.1)	50.9 (10.5)	68.6 (20.3)	80.1 (26.7)	86.8 (30.4)	90.8 (32.7)	90.4 (32.4)	89.5 (31.9)	87.9 (31.1)	81.2 (27.3)	65.2 (18.4)	50.8 (10.4)	92.9 (33.8)
Mean daily maximum °F (°C)	27.8 (−2.3)	32.1 (0.1)	45.1 (7.3)	58.9 (14.9)	70.8 (21.6)	79.3 (26.3)	81.7 (27.6)	80.0 (26.7)	74.2 (23.4)	61.5 (16.4)	45.8 (7.7)	33.0 (0.6)	57.5 (14.2)
Daily mean °F (°C)	20.0 (−6.7)	24.0 (−4.4)	35.9 (2.2)	48.0 (8.9)	59.9 (15.5)	69.0 (20.6)	71.5 (21.9)	69.6 (20.9)	62.7 (17.1)	50.8 (10.4)	37.4 (3.0)	25.5 (−3.6)	47.9 (8.8)
Mean daily minimum °F (°C)	12.1 (−11.1)	15.8 (−9.0)	26.8 (−2.9)	37.0 (2.8)	48.9 (9.4)	58.7 (14.8)	61.3 (16.3)	59.1 (15.1)	51.2 (10.7)	40.2 (4.6)	28.9 (−1.7)	18.1 (−7.7)	38.2 (3.4)
Mean minimum °F (°C)	−11.7 (−24.3)	−5.9 (−21.1)	5.8 (−14.6)	22.4 (−5.3)	34.1 (1.2)	44.9 (7.2)	49.9 (9.9)	48.1 (8.9)	35.7 (2.1)	24.9 (−3.9)	11.2 (−11.6)	−3.9 (−19.9)	−16.0 (−26.7)
Record low °F (°C)	−32 (−36)	−30 (−34)	−18 (−28)	7 (−14)	24 (−4)	37 (3)	40 (4)	39 (4)	26 (−3)	13 (−11)	−10 (−23)	−24 (−31)	−32 (−36)
Average precipitation inches (mm)	1.17 (30)	1.52 (39)	2.20 (56)	3.93 (100)	4.13 (105)	5.72 (145)	4.50 (114)	4.16 (106)	4.22 (107)	3.10 (79)	2.32 (59)	1.69 (43)	38.66 (982)
Average snowfall inches (cm)	10.7 (27)	8.1 (21)	4.9 (12)	1.3 (3.3)	0.1 (0.25)	0.0 (0.0)	0.0 (0.0)	0.0 (0.0)	0.0 (0.0)	0.5 (1.3)	2.1 (5.3)	8.0 (20)	35.7 (91)
Average precipitation days (≥ 0.01 in)	8.7	8.2	9.7	11.7	12.7	11.8	9.3	9.7	9.1	9.4	8.5	9.6	118.4
Average snowy days (≥ 0.1 in)	6.6	5.6	3.2	0.9	0.0	0.0	0.0	0.0	0.0	0.3	1.6	5.8	24.0
Source: NOAA

=== Geology ===
Stockton is not part of the Driftless Area, but is the first municipality found outside of it, coming from western Jo Daviess County. One climbs out of the valley of the Upper Mississippi River and finds a high point in Stockton.

The village water tower sits on a ridge at elevation 1,105 ft (337 m) that rises to 1,120 ft (340 m) to the west at the village limits. To the northwest the same ridge line continues where U.S. Route 20 crests at 1,077 ft (328 m) just to the west. This ridge line continues for 3 miles to the northwest to Benton Mound (1,204 ft; 367 m ), the second highest peak in Illinois.

=== Historical landmarks ===
- Townsend Home
- W.E. White Building
- Great Western Hotel

=== Major highways ===
- U.S. Route 20, east towards Freeport and west towards Galena
- Illinois Route 78, north towards Warren and the Wisconsin state line and south towards Mount Carroll

== Demographics ==
Historical population
Census	Pop.	Note	%±
1890	379		—
1900	946		149.6%
1910	1,096		15.9%
1920	1,449		32.2%
1930	1,505		3.9%
1940	1,440		−4.3%
1950	1,445		0.3%
1960	1,800		24.6%
1970	1,930		7.2%
1980	1,872		−3.0%
1990	1,871		−0.1%
2000	1,926		2.9%
2010	1,862		−3.3%
2020	1,728		−7.2%
U.S. Decennial Census

=== 2020 census ===
As of the 2020 census, there were 1,728 people, 775 households, and 481 families residing in the village.

The population density was 920.62 inhabitants per square mile (355.45/km^{2}). There were 873 housing units at an average density of 465.10 per square mile (179.58/km^{2}). The median age was 45.9 years. 21.2% of residents were under the age of 18 and 23.7% of residents were 65 years of age or older. For every 100 females there were 97.9 males, and for every 100 females age 18 and over there were 90.9 males age 18 and over.

0.0% of residents lived in urban areas, while 100.0% lived in rural areas.

Of households in Stockton, 25.8% had children under the age of 18 living in them. Of all households, 40.1% were married-couple households, 20.4% were households with a male householder and no spouse or partner present, and 32.9% were households with a female householder and no spouse or partner present. About 36.1% of all households were made up of individuals and 18.6% had someone living alone who was 65 years of age or older.

Of housing units in the village, 11.2% were vacant. The homeowner vacancy rate was 3.1% and the rental vacancy rate was 13.4%.

Racial composition as of the 2020 census
Race	Number	Percent
White	1,620	93.8%
Black or African American	14	0.8%
American Indian and Alaska Native	1	0.1%
Asian	9	0.5%
Native Hawaiian and Other Pacific Islander	0	0.0%
Some other race	8	0.5%
Two or more races	76	4.4%
Hispanic or Latino (of any race)	58	3.4%

=== Income and poverty ===
The median income for a household in the village was $43,295, and the median income for a family was $55,060. Males had a median income of $31,643 versus $20,441 for females. The per capita income for the village was $26,501. About 23.5% of families and 18.1% of the population were below the poverty line, including 28.1% of those under age 18 and 2.8% of those age 65 or over.

== Notable people ==
- Leo Binz, archbishop of Dubuque and St. Paul and Minneapolis; born in Stockton
- Charles E. Byrum, member of the South Dakota House of Representatives; born in Stockton
- Dennis Gage, host of the television show My Classic Car; grew up in Stockton
- Ron Lawfer, farmer and Illinois legislator; born in Stockton
