= Warren Village Historic District =

Historic district in Vermont, United States

- U.S. National Register of Historic Places
- U.S. Historic district
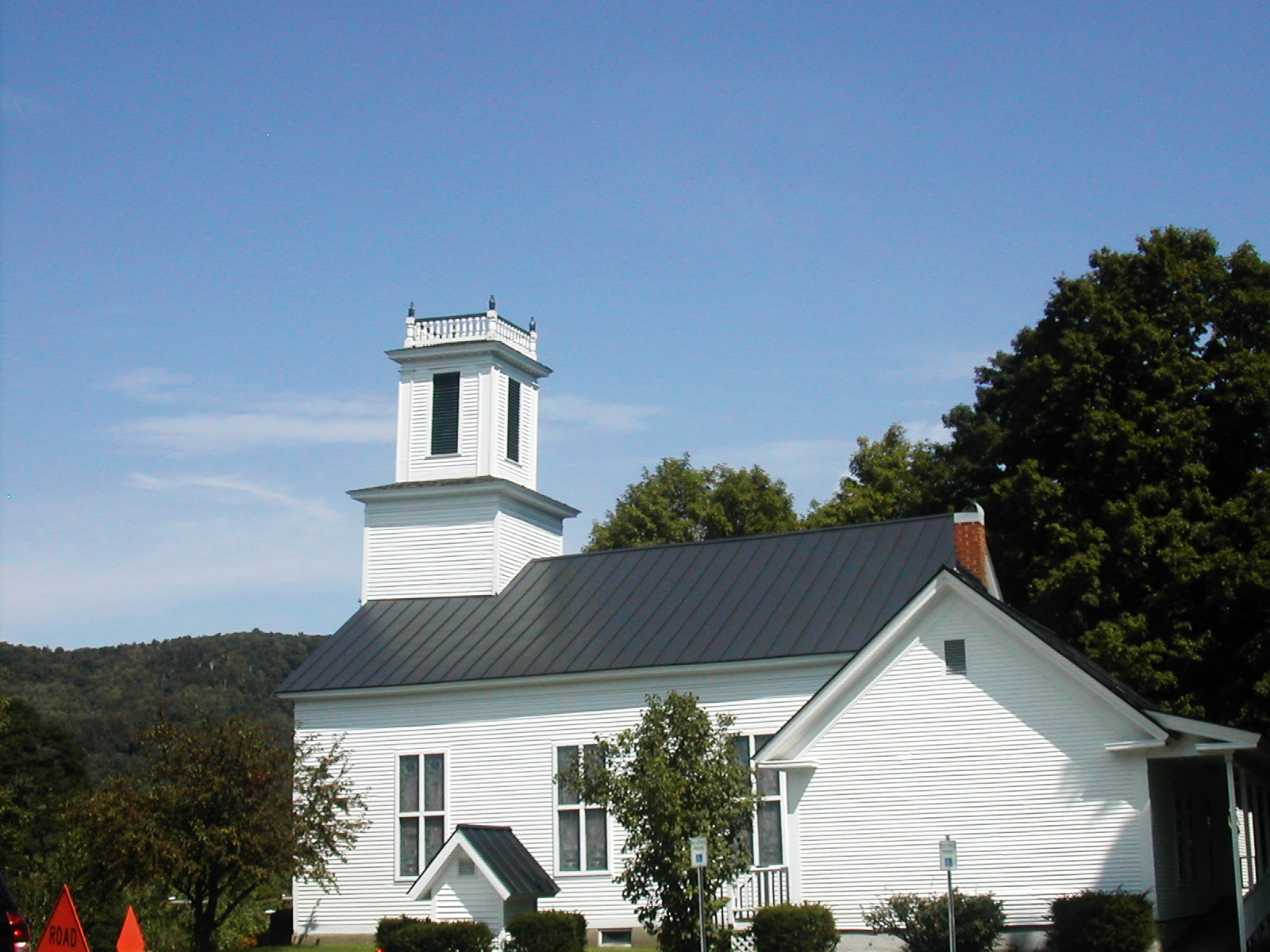
- Warren Church

- Location within Vermont Location within the United States
- Location: Along Town Hwys. 1, 4, 16 and 17, Warren, Vermont
- Coordinates: 44°6′49″N 72°51′24″W
- Area: 51 acres (21 ha)
- Built by: Bagley, Walter; Ralph, Daniel
- Architectural style: Greek Revival, Second Empire, Italianate
- MPS: Mad River Valley MPS
- NRHP reference No.: 92001532
- Added to NRHP: November 20, 1992

The Warren Village Historic District encompasses the village center of Warren, Vermont, United States. Stretched mainly along Main Street east of the Mad River, it is a well-preserved 19th-century mill village, although most of its period mill infrastructure has been lost. The district has good examples of Greek Revival, Italianate, and Second Empire architecture. It was listed on the National Register of Historic Places in 1992.

== Description and history ==
The town of Warren was chartered in 1789, with early settlement in the eastern parts of the town. A road from Granville to Waitsfield was built along the Mad River, including the portion of Main Street on the river's east bank. Brook Road, extending east from Main Street, was built by the 1820s, when the village began to take shape. Development was spurred by the availability of water power on the river itself and on several tributaries that feed it in the immediate area. The cemetery and village common were laid out in 1826, its first school in 1835, and the first church in 1838. By the 1870s there were as many as nine mills, producing a variety of products, in the immediate area of the village. The economy was severely damaged in the early 20th century by a series of fires and floods, which destroyed all of the local mills. The 1927 flood was particularly severe, washing out all but one of the dams on the local waterways. Vermont Route 100, located on the west side of the Mad River, was built in the 1950s, and the area has since seen a minor resurgence as a center for ski tourism, fueled by the Sugarbush Resort north of the village.

The historic district's northern end is on the west side of the Mad River, at the junction of Main Street and Vermont Route 100. It soon crosses the river on a modern bridge, and its southern extent is beyond the Warren Covered Bridge. It extends eastward on Flat Iron Road and Brook Road, and includes the village cemetery on Cemetery Road. Most of the buildings are of wood frame construction, 1-1/2 to 2-1/2 stories in height. The predominant architectural styles are Greek Revival and Italianate, although they are largely vernacular in expression. There are two small well-crafted Second Empire houses in the village. Also included in the historic district are the archaeological remnants of the village's industrial past, and the one surviving dam on the Mad River. When the district was first listed, the dam was thought to be a 1978 reconstruction; later research confirmed that the dam survived the 1927 floods and was repaired then and in 1978.

== See also ==
- National Register of Historic Places listings in Washington County, Vermont
