= Warrenton Historic District =

Warrenton Historic District may refer to:

- Warrenton Downtown Historic District, Warrenton, GA, listed on the NRHP in Georgia
- Warrenton Historic District (Warrenton, North Carolina), listed on the NRHP in North Carolina
- Warrenton Historic District (Warrenton, Virginia), listed on the NRHP in Virginia
