= W.E. White Building =

- U.S. National Register of Historic Places
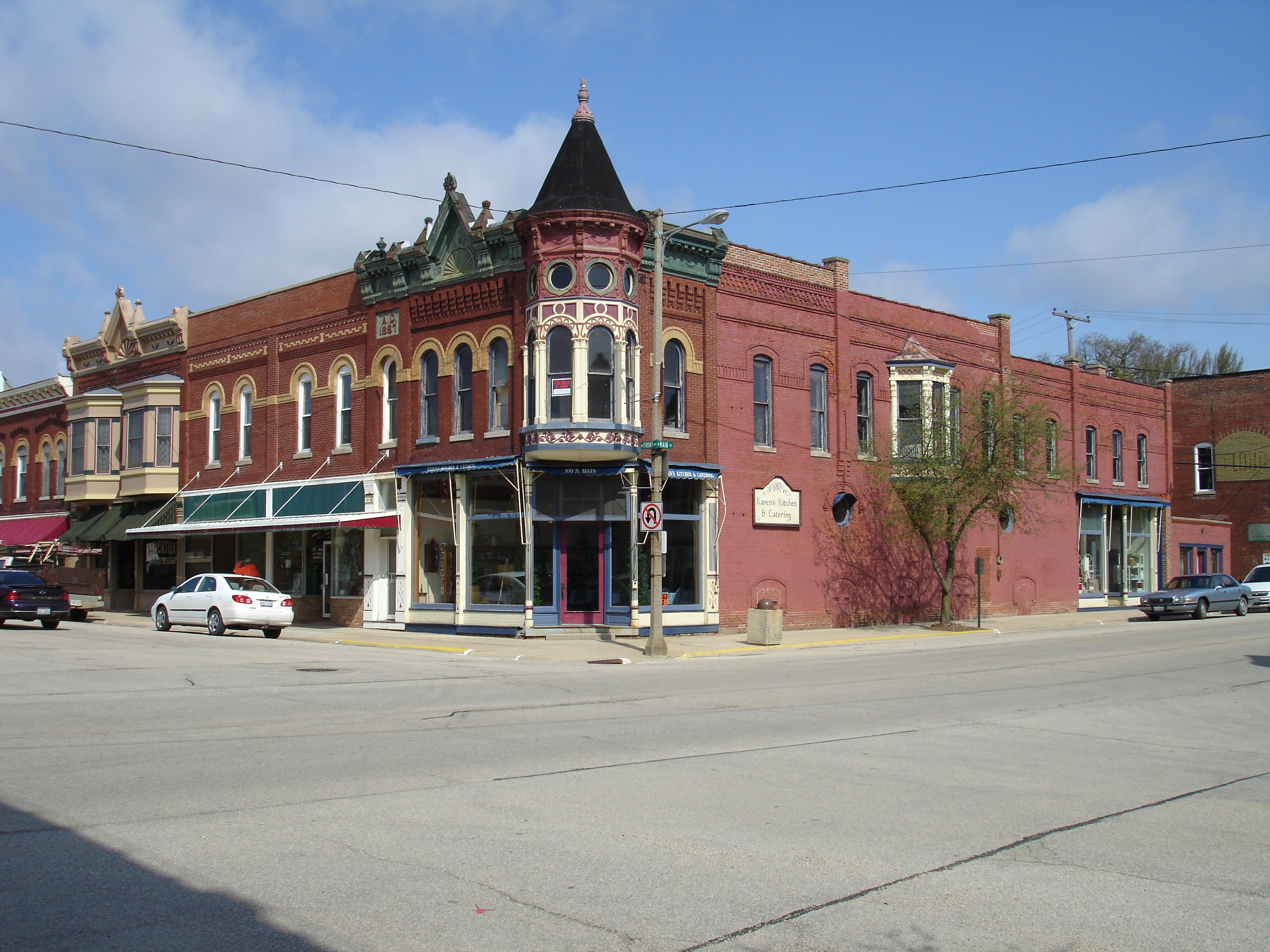

- Location within Illinois Location within the United States
- Location: 100 N. Main St., Stockton, Illinois
- Coordinates: 42.349969°N 90.006913°W
- Area: Less than one acre
- Built: 1897
- Architect: Schroeder, Peter
- Architectural style: Queen Anne
- NRHP reference No.: 97001339
- Added to NRHP: November 7, 1997

The W.E. White Building is a historic commercial building located in downtown Stockton, Illinois, United States. It was constructed in the Queen Anne style in 1897 and designed and built by Peter Schroeder. The building was added to the U.S. National Register of Historic Places in 1997.

== History ==
The W.E. White Building was constructed in 1897, one of many commercial structures erected following a devastating fire in Stockton. After the 1896 fire, William and Mary O'Rourke erected a wood-frame dry goods store at the location of the White Building. Mary soon became postmaster and the store became Stockton's first post office.

In August 1897, a small piece of the downtown lot owned by the O'Rourkes was sold to Wilbur E. White for $3,500. White moved the old post office and dry goods store to the lot's rear and hired Peter Schroeder, a local architect and builder, to design and erect the W.E. White Building.

== Architecture ==
The W.E. White Building is an example of late 19th-century Queen Anne commercial architecture. The red brick building is 25 feet wide by 90 feet long and sits on the northwest corner of Front and Main Street in downtown Stockton. Its main entrance sits diagonally on the building's southeast corner. Multiple elements of Queen Anne style are present on the White Building, including a projecting cone-shaped turret, a metal-wrapped oriel bay, decorative pediments, and a cannonball finial. The building displays a shift toward Classical influences in its garland swags, classical columns and acanthus leaves.

== Historic significance ==
The late 19th-century Queen Anne White Building exemplifies an era of optimism in Stockton, as the city strove to rebuild after a destructive fire in 1896. The building is a prominent landmark in downtown Stockton; its architectural features cause it to stand out as one of the most decorative downtown buildings in Stockton.

The W.E. White Building was added to the U.S. National Register of Historic Places on November 7, 1997.
