= Henry N. Frentess Farmstead =

Historic house in Illinois, United States

- U.S. National Register of Historic Places
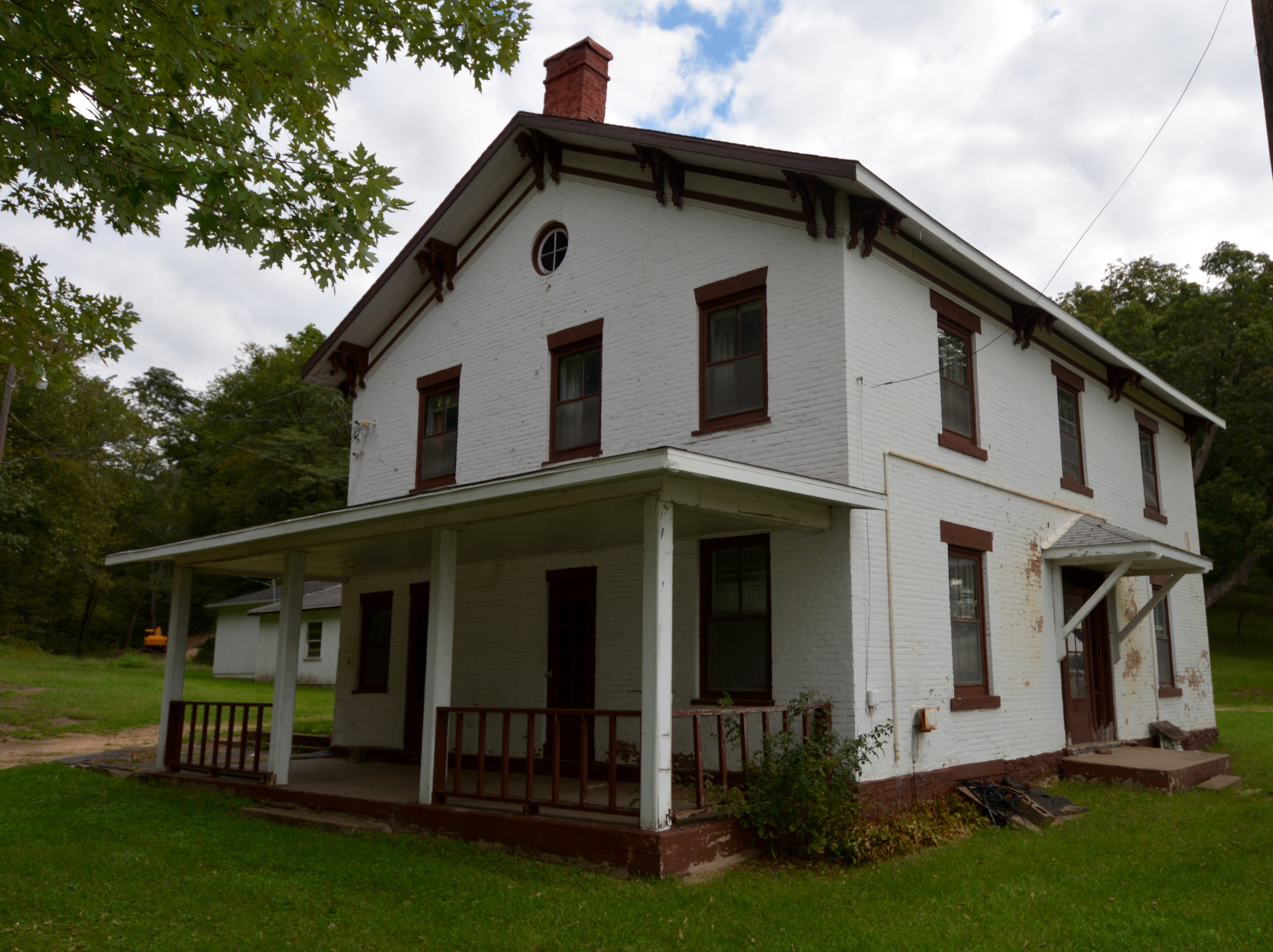

- Location within Illinois Location within the United States
- Location: 19140 U.S. Route 20 W., East Dubuque, Illinois
- Coordinates: 42°28′18″N 90°36′11″W
- Architectural style: Italianate
- NRHP reference No.: 10001202
- Added to NRHP: February 4, 2011

The Henry N. Frentress Farmstead is a historic farm located at, 19140 U.S. Route 20 West in East Dubuque, Illinois. The farm was established in 1832 by the parents of Henry N. Frentress; Henry, the family's most noteworthy and prosperous farmer, ran the farm from 1876 to his death in 1899. His agricultural pursuits included both common farm products such as livestock and wheat, which he shipped to large markets on the Illinois Central Railroad, and several varieties of fruit, which he sold locally. He was also known for his engineering innovations; his most profitable was a new variety of barbed wire, the profits from which bolstered East Dubuque's developing economy. Henry and his mother also built the farm's Italianate farmhouse; the farmhouse is one of two main buildings remaining at the farm, along with a summer kitchen which dates to the 1830s.

The farm was added to the National Register of Historic Places on February 4, 2011.
