= Elihu Benjamin Washburne House =

Historic house in Illinois, United States

- U.S. National Register of Historic Places
- U.S. Historic district – Contributing property
- Illinois State Historic Site
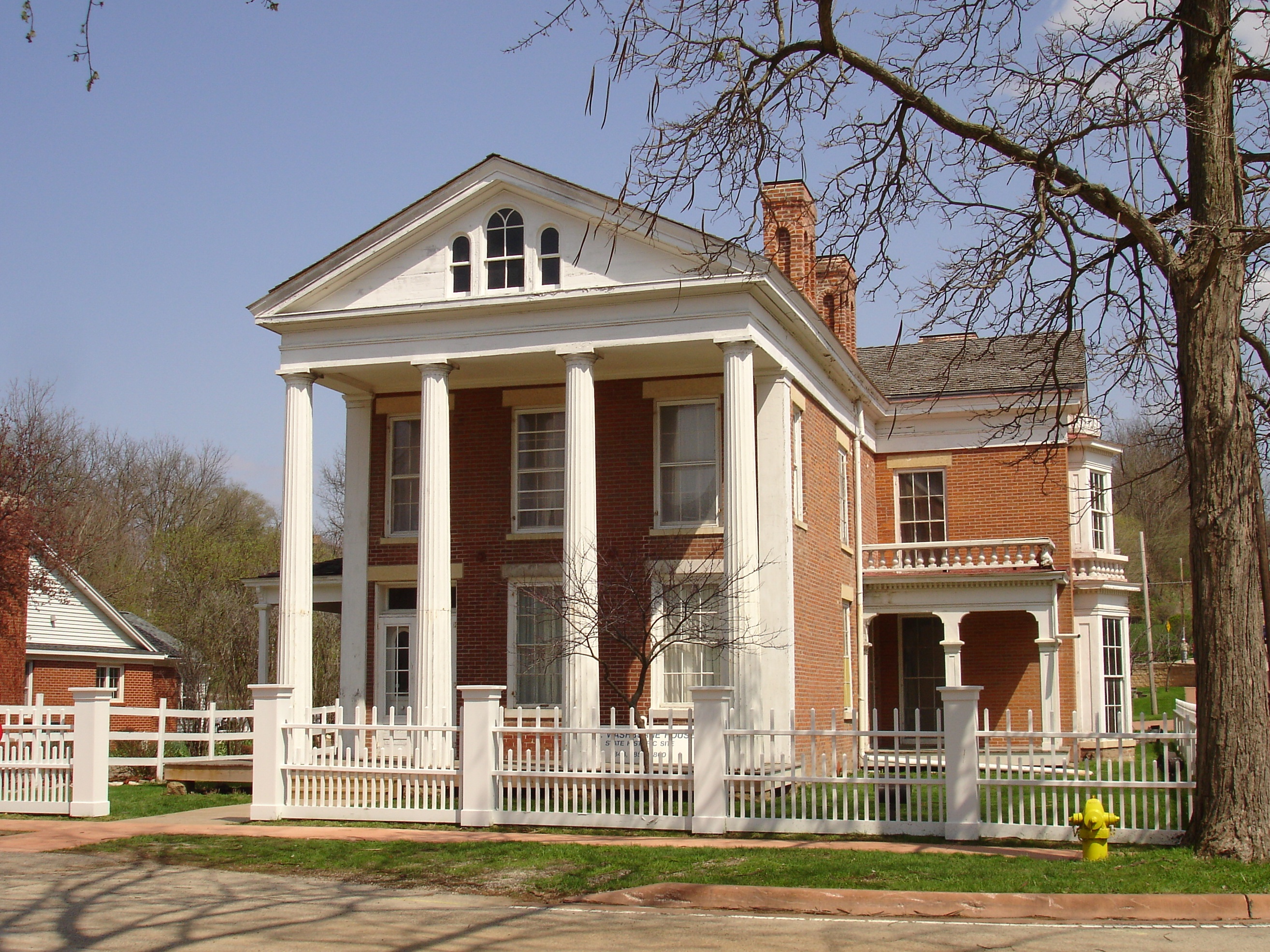

- Location within Illinois Location within the United States
- Interactive map showing Washburne House’s location
- Location: 908 3rd St., Galena, Illinois
- Coordinates: 42°24′50″N 90°25′54″W
- Area: less than one acre
- Built: 1844
- Architectural style: Greek Revival
- NRHP reference No.: 73000708
- Added to NRHP: July 5, 1973

The Elihu Benjamin Washburne House, also known as the Washburne-Sheehan House, is a 1 1/2-story Greek Revival house located at 908 Third Street in Galena, Illinois. Constructed in 1844–45, the building was built for and owned by Elihu Benjamin Washburne, a prominent Galena lawyer who served in Congress during the American Civil War, and as Secretary of State and Minister to France under President Ulysses S. Grant, another famous Galenian. The Washburne House was added to the U.S. National Register of Historic Places in 1973.

== History ==
Born to a prominent political family from Maine which played a major role in founding the Republican Party, Elihu Washburne moved to Galena to practice law in 1840, and the success and social standing he gained became reflected in his house, the design and construction of which was supervised by Washburne himself. The house was enlarged to its present size in 1859, while Washburne was serving in Congress. Washburne and his wife, Adele Gratiot Washburne, owned the house until 1882, when they moved to Chicago. Washburne died in Chicago in 1887, and is buried at Greenwood Cemetery in Galena.

At some point after the Washburnes moved to Chicago, the house was purchased by the Sheehan family, which owned the house until 1968, when it was sold to the State of Illinois.

== Architecture ==
The Elihu B. Washburne House represents a good example of late Greek Revival architecture. The house was built in the style of Greek temples and features a two-story porch with four fluted Doric columns.

== State historic site ==
The Elihu B. Washburne House is administered by the Illinois Historic Preservation Agency and is open to the public for tours. The Washburne House is a declared Illinois State Historic Site.

The house is open for guided tours of the first floor and two second-floor bedrooms. Tours emphasize Elihu Washburne and his Civil War-era friendships with Abraham Lincoln and Ulysses S. Grant. The rooms are furnished to reflect the mid-19th-century life of a well-to-do midwestern professional.

== Historic significance ==
The U.S. National Register of Historic Places added the Washburne House to its listings on July 5, 1973. The 1970s Illinois Historic Sites Survey noted the Washburne House for its importance architecturally as well as for its association with Elihu Washburne. The Washburne House also lies within the Galena Historic District, designated in 1969, the district has more than 1,000 contributing properties.
