= Warren Commercial Historic District (Warren, Illinois) =

Historic district in Illinois, United States

- U.S. National Register of Historic Places
- U.S. Historic district
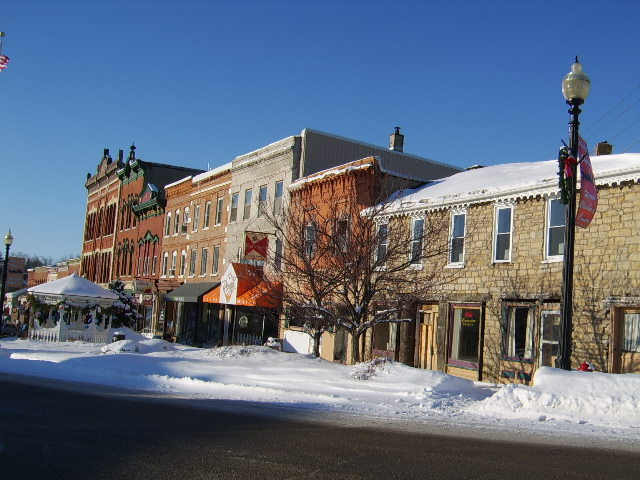

- Location within Illinois Location within the United States
- Location: 102-165 E. Main St., 204-210 E. Bunett, 102-108 S. Railroad, Warren, Illinois
- Coordinates: 42°29′45″N 89°59′15″W
- Area: 9 acres (3.6 ha)
- NRHP reference No.: 95001241
- Added to NRHP: November 7, 1995

The Warren Commercial Historic District is a historic commercial district located in Warren, Illinois. The district encompasses the town's central business district and includes 34 contributing buildings and a water tower. Development in the district began in 1852, the year that the Illinois Central Railroad came to Warren, and continued into the twentieth century. The railroad depot is a centerpiece of the district, as Warren's economy depended heavily on the railroad. Later development in the district mainly took place in the form of several distinct additions; as a result, lots in the district are irregularly sized. Most of the buildings in the district are vernacular brick commercial structures with pressed metal or brick ornamentation, though examples of Victorian and Classical Revival architecture can also be seen.

The district was added to the National Register of Historic Places on November 7, 1995.
