= List of museums in Illinois =

This list of museums in Illinois contains museums which are defined for this context as institutions (including nonprofit organizations, government entities, and private businesses) that collect and care for objects of cultural, artistic, scientific, or historical interest and make their collections or related exhibits available for public viewing. Also included are non-profit and university art galleries. Museums that exist only in cyberspace (i.e., virtual museums) are not included.

== Museums ==
Name	Location	County	Region	Type	Summary	Website
1930s Preserving Agriculture Museum	Quincy	Adams	Western	Agriculture	John Deere agriculture machinery that would have been found on a farm in the Midwest during the 1930s, open by appointment	
A. Philip Randolph Pullman Porter Museum	Chicago	Cook	Chicago area	African American	Contributions made by Black Americans to America's labor history	Homepage
Abraham Lincoln Long Nine Museum	Athens	Menard	Central	Historic site	Audio narrated diorama tour telling about Abraham Lincoln and the selection of Springfield as the state capital in the late 1830s	
Abraham Lincoln Presidential Library and Museum	Springfield	Sangamon	Central	Biographical	Life of the 16th U.S. president, Abraham Lincoln, and the course of the American Civil War	
Addison Historical Museum	Addison	DuPage	Chicago area	Local history	Operated by the Addison Historical Society	Homepage
Adler Planetarium	Chicago	Cook	Chicago area	Science		
African American Hall of Fame Museum	Peoria	Peoria	Central	African American	Located in the John C. Proctor Recreation Center	
African American Museum of Southern Illinois	Carbondale	Jackson	Southern	African American	Located in University Mall	
Air Classics Museum of Aviation	Sugar Grove	Kane	Northern Illinois	Aviation	Aircraft, vehicles, uniforms and aviation memorabilia from the 1930s to the present, located at Aurora Municipal Airport	website
Air Combat Museum	Springfield	Sangamon	Central	Aviation	Historic combat aircraft	Homepage
Alexis Museum	Alexis	Warren	Quad Cities	Local history		
All Wars Museum	Quincy	Adams	Western	Military	Located on the grounds of the Illinois Veterans Home, displays military artifacts from the Revolutionary War to the present	website
Altamont Living Museum	Altamont	Effingham	Central	Entertainment	1912 former church, hosts live music and dance performances, as well as fine art exhibits	
Alton Museum of History and Art	Alton	Madison	Metro-East	Local history	Exhibits include world's tallest man Robert Pershing Wadlow, Piasa Bird, Lincoln–Douglas debate, American Civil War, and changing art exhibits	
Amboy Depot Museum	Amboy	Lee	Northern Illinois	Railroad	History of Amboy and the Illinois Central Railroad	
American Farm Heritage Museum	Greenville	Bond	Southern	Agriculture	Includes tractors and farm machinery	Homepage
American Fluorite Museum	Rosiclare	Hardin	Southern	Mining	Exhibits on fluorspar mining industry, fluorite ore specimens, mining paraphernalia and photographs	
American Movie Palace Museum	Elmhurst	DuPage	Chicago area	Entertainment	Operated by the Theatre Historical Society of America, objects from the era of the great movie palaces in the U.S.	
American Toby Jug Museum	Evanston	Cook	Chicago area	Decorative art	Toby jug and character jug collection	Homepage
Anderson Mansion Museum	Carlinville	Macoupin	Central	Open air	Operated by the Macoupin County Historical Society, includes Victorian house with period displays, schoolhouse and print shop	
Andover Historical Museum	Andover	Henry	Western	Local history		
Ansel B. Cook House	Libertyville	Lake	Chicago area	Historic house	Victorian-period house, operated by the Libertyville-Mundelein Historical Society	
Aplington House	Polo	Ogle	Northern Illinois	Historic house	Operated by the Polo Historical Society	
Apple River Fort State Historic Site	Elizabeth	Jo Daviess	Northern Illinois	Living	Recreated 1830s fort	
Arlington Heights Historical Museum	Arlington Heights	Cook	Chicago area	Open air	Includes 1882 Victorian Muller House, coach house, 1906 soda pop factory, 1908 Banta house and a replica 1830s log cabin	
Art Center Highland Park	Highland Park	Lake	Chicago area	Art	Not-for-profit contemporary visual arts organization	Homepage
Art Institute of Chicago	Chicago	Cook	Chicago area	Art		
Arts Club of Chicago	Chicago	Cook	Chicago area	Art	Changing exhibits of cutting edge and avant-garde art	
Atlanta Museum	Atlanta	Logan	Central	Local history		Homepage
Atkinson Historical Society Museum	Atkinson	Henry	Western	Local history		
Atkinson-Peek House	Moline	Rock Island	Quad Cities	Historic house	Operated by the Rock Island County Historical Society, early 20th-century period house and adjacent Carriage House Museum	Homepage
Augustana Teaching Museum of Art	Rock Island	Rock Island	Quad Cities	Art	Part of Augustana College	Homepage
Aurora Regional Fire Museum	Aurora	Kane	Chicago area	Firefighting		
B&B National Toy Museum	Cambridge	Henry	Western	Toy	1890 house with advanced engineering	
Balzekas Museum of Lithuanian Culture	Chicago	Cook	Chicago area	Cultural	Lithuanian history, culture and art	
Banwarth House & Museum	Elizabeth	Jo Daviess	Northern Illinois	Historic house	1876 Victorian period house, operated by the Planetary Studies Foundation	Homepage
Barrington History Museum	Barrington	Cook	Chicago area	Local history	Located in Old Barrington Center, operated by the Barrington Historical Society	Homepage
Bartlett Depot Museum	Bartlett	Cook	Chicago area	Railroad		Homepage
Bartlett History Museum	Bartlett	Cook	Chicago area	Local history	Located in Village Hall	Homepage
Batavia Depot Museum	Batavia	Kane	Northern Illinois	Railroad	Operated by the Batavia Historical Society	
Beall Mansion	Alton	Madison	Metro-East	Historic house	Turn-of-the-20th-century mansion designed by world-famous architect, Lucas Pfeifenberger, former residence of Senator Edmond Beall, politician and industrialist, tours by appointment	Homepage
Beardstown Historical Museum	Beardstown	Cass	Western	Local history	Located in the courthouse with the Old Lincoln Courtroom, collection includes guns, Civil War memorabilia, and Native American artifacts.	Homepage
Beith House Museum	St. Charles	Kane	Northern Illinois	Historic house	Mid-19th-century house, operated by the Preservation Partners of the Fox Valley	
Belgian Museum of the Quad Cities	Moline	Rock Island	Quad Cities	Ethnic	Also known as the Center for Belgian Culture	Homepage
Beller Museum	Romeoville	Will	Chicago area	Automotive	Open by appointment. Displays cars, trucks and memorabilia	Homepage
Belvedere Mansion	Galena	Jo Daviess	Northern Illinois	Historic house	1857 mansion and gardens	Homepage
Ben Winter Museum	Altamont	Effingham	Central	Technology	Antique steam engines	
Benjamin Stephenson House	Edwardsville	Madison	Metro-East	Historic house	Restored 1820s period house	
Bethalto Historical Museum	Bethalto	Madison	Metro-East	Local history	Located in the former Village Hall	
Bethel School	Friends Creek Township	Macon	Central	School	Operated by the Macon County Conservation District, 1890 one-room schoolhouse	
Big Rock Historical Society Crib Museum	Big Rock	Kane	Chicago area	Local history		Homepage
Billy Barnhart Museum	Oregon	Ogle	Northern Illinois	Commodity	Collection includes vintage toys, collectibles, sleighs, farm equipment, and other relics of the past	
Billy Graham Center Museum	Wheaton	DuPage	Chicago area	Religious	History of Christian evangelism in the United States, Billy Graham, missions and Christian themes	
Birks Museum	Decatur	Macon	Central	Decorative arts	Part of Millikin University in Gorin Hall	Homepage
Bishop Hill State Historic Site	Bishop Hill	Henry	Western	Open air	Site of a former Utopian community	
Blackberry Farm Museum	Aurora	Kane	Chicago area	Living	Five museums including the Carriage House, the Farm Museum, the Early Streets Museum and the Huntoon House, Victorian era	Homepage
Blackwell History of Education Museum	DeKalb	DeKalb	Northern Illinois	History	Part of Northern Illinois University. Exhibits concern the history of American education, including a replica one-room schoolhouse	Homepage
Black Hawk State Historic Site	Rock Island	Rock Island	Quad Cities	Native American	Includes John Hauberg Museum of Native American Life and Singing Bird Nature Center	
Bloomingdale Park District Museum	Bloomingdale	DuPage	Chicago area	Art	Changing local art exhibits	Homepage
Blue Island Historical Museum	Blue Island	Cook	Southern	Local history	Operated by the Blue Island Historical Society in the lower level of the Blue Island Public Library, illustrates the history of the Blue Island area from before the time of the city's founding in 1836. The society also operates the historic Albee House museum.	Homepage
Boone County Historical Museum	Belvidere	Boone	Northern Illinois	Local history	Operated by the Boone County Historical Society, includes 160-year-old log cabin, general store, bank, barbershop, one-room school displays	Homepage
Bradley University Galleries	Peoria	Peoria	Central	Art	Heuser Art Center Gallery, Hartmann Center Gallery, Student Project Space	Homepage
Braidwood Area Historical Society Museum	Braidwood	Will	Chicago area	Local history		Homepage
Breaking the Prairie Museum	Mendota	LaSalle	Northern Illinois	Agriculture	Operated by the Mendota Museum & Historical Society, focus on farm family life, equipment, livestock and faith	
Bretton and Black Museum	Hampton	Rock Island	Quad Cities	Local history	Operated by the Hampton Historical Society, restored 1849 store	
Bronzeville Children's Museum	Chicago	Cook	Chicago area	Children's	Focuses on the historical experiences of African-American children	
Brunk Morgan Horse Museum	Rochester	Sangamon	Central	Historic house	Exhibits about George Brunk, breeder of the Morgan horse	
Bryant Cottage State Historic Site	Bement	Piatt	Central	Historic house	Middle-class mid-19th-century house	Homepage
Bureau County Historical Society Museum	Princeton	Bureau	Northern Illinois	Historic house	Museum occupies two adjacent homes, Clark-Norris Home and Newell-Bryant House	Homepage
Burpee Museum of Natural History	Rockford	Winnebago	Northern Illinois	Natural history	Dinosaurs, fossils, geology, area Native Americans, wildlife of the Rock River Valley	
Bushnell-Wheeler House	South Beloit	Winnebago	Northern Illinois	Local history	Operated by the South Beloit Historical Society	Homepage
Butterworth Center	Moline	Rock Island	Quad Cities	Historic house	Features antique Venetian-style ceiling paintings, operated by the William Butterworth Foundation	Homepage
Byron Museum of History	Byron	Ogle	Northern Illinois	Local history		Homepage
Cahokia Courthouse State Historic Site	Cahokia	St. Clair	Metro-East	Historic site	Reconstructed frontier courthouse	
Cahokia Mounds State Historic Site	Collinsville	St. Clair	Metro-East	Native American	Site of an ancient American Indian city	Homepage
Cairo Custom House	Cairo	Alexander	Southern	Local history	Includes exhibits about local African American heritage, USS Cairo (1861), prehistoric Native American artifacts	
Calumet City Historical Society Museum	Calumet City	Cook	Chicago area	Local history		Homepage
Camp Grant Museum	Rockford	Winnebago	Northern Illinois	Military	History of Camp Grant and local history	Homepage
Cantigny	Wheaton	DuPage	Chicago area	Historic site	1,000-acre (4.0 km^{2}) estate with two museums: Robert R. McCormick Museum, a 1930s historic mansion with biographical exhibits, and the First Division Museum at Cantigny	
Carl Sandburg State Historic Site	Galesburg	Knox	Western	Biographical	Boyhood home and museum about poet Carl Sandburg	
Carnegie Museum	Olney	Richland	Southern	Local history	Open by appointment with the Richland Heritage Museum Foundation	
Carthage Jail	Carthage	Hancock	Central	Prison	Jail that was the location of the murder of Joseph Smith and his brother Hynum	
Caterpillar Visitors Center	Peoria	Peoria	Central	Industry	History of Caterpillar Inc. and its earth-moving equipment	Homepage
Catharine V. Yost House Museum	Pontiac	Livingston	Central	Historic house	Open by appointment, turn of the 20th-century period house	
Catlin Heritage Museum	Catlin	Vermilion	Central	Local history	Operated by the Catlin Historical Society	Homepage
Cedarhurst Center for the Arts	Mt. Vernon	Jefferson	Southern	Art	American art, includes Mitchell Museum, Cedarhurst Sculpture Park, main gallery with changing exhibits	
Cedarville Area Historical Society Museum	Cedarville	Stephenson	Northern Illinois	Local history		Homepage
Center for American Archeology	Kampsville	Calhoun	Central	Archeology	Prehistory of the lower Illinois River Valley	
Center for History	Wheaton	DuPage	Chicago area	Local history	Formerly Wheaton History Center, currently seeking new location	
Central Wabash Archaeology Museum	Robinson	Crawford	Southern	Archaeology	Artifacts excavated in the area	Homepage
Centralia Museum	Centralia	Marion	Southern	Local history		Homepage
Cernan Earth and Space Center	River Grove	Cook	Chicago area	Aerospace	Public planetarium on the campus of Triton College, includes earth and space-related exhibits	
Champaign County Historical Museum	Champaign	Champaign	Champaign–Urbana metropolitan area	Local history	Includes quilts, clothing, toys, furniture, a general store, military items	Homepage
Chana School	Oregon	Ogle	Northern Illinois	School	19th-century two-room schoolhouse	
Chaplin Creek Village	Franklin Grove	Lee	Northern Illinois	Open air	Operated by the Franklin Grove Area Historical Society. Historical restoration depicting a mid-19th-century prairie settlement	Homepage
Charles Gates Dawes House Museum	Evanston	Cook	Chicago area	Historic house	Also known as the Evanston History Center. The 1894 mansion in the French Chateaux style, designed by Henry Edwards-Ficken, features twenty-five rooms, six bedrooms, seven bathrooms and eleven fireplaces.	
Charter Oak Schoolhouse	Schuline	Randolph	Southern	School	One-room schoolhouse, open for events	
Chatham Railroad Museum	Chatham	Sangamon	Central	Railroad		Homepage
Cherry Valley Historical Society Museum	Cherry Valley	Winnebago	Northern Illinois	Local history		Homepage
Chicago Athenaeum: Museum of Architecture and Design	Galena	Jo Daviess	Northern Illinois	Art	Art of design in all areas of the discipline: architecture, industrial and product design, graphics and urban planning	
Chicago Athenaeum's International Sculpture Park	Schaumburg	Cook	Chicago area	Art	Outdoor sculpture park on 20 acres (81,000 m^{2})	
Chicago Children's Museum	Chicago	Cook	Chicago area	Children's	Located at Navy Pier	
Chicago Cultural Center	Chicago	Cook	Chicago area	Art	Visual art exhibitions and cultural performances	
Chicago Design Museum	Chicago	Cook	Chicago area	Design	Independently owned and operated	
Chicago Gamespace	Chicago	Cook	Chicago area	Video games	Independently owned and operated	Homepage
Chicago Great Western Railroad Depot Museum	Elizabeth	Jo Daviess	Northern Illinois	Railroad	Operated by the Elizabeth Historical Society, includes N-scale, HO-scale, and G-scale model railroad layouts	
Chicago History Museum	Chicago	Cook	Chicago area	Local history	City history and culture	
Chicago Maritime Museum	Chicago	Cook	Chicago area	Maritime	Maritime history of Chicago and the Great Lakes	Homepage
Chicago Sports Museum	Chicago	Cook	Chicago area	Local history	Chicago sports teams' memorabilia, athletes, interactive sports activities	
Children's Discovery Museum	Normal	McLean	Central	Children's		Homepage
Children's Museum in Oak Lawn	Oak Lawn	Cook	Chicago area	Children's		Homepage
Children's Museum of Illinois	Decatur	Macon	Central	Children's		Homepage
Children's Neighborhood Museum	Round Lake	Lake	Chicago area	Children's	Located in the Robert W. Rolek Community Center	Homepage
Chinese-American Museum of Chicago	Chicago	Cook	Chicago area	Ethnic	Chinese-American cultural heritage of the Midwest	
Clark County Museum	Marshall	Clark	Central	Local history	Operated by the Clark County Historical Society in the Manly-McCann House	
Clarke House Museum	Chicago	Cook	Chicago area	Historic house	1836 pre-Civil War Greek Revival house	
Collinsville Historical Museum	Collinsville	Madison	Metro-East	Local history		Homepage
Colonel Davenport House	Rock Island	Rock Island	Quad Cities	Historic house	1833 mansion	Homepage
Colonel Palmer House	Crystal Lake	McHenry	Northern Illinois	Historic house	Operated by the Crystal Lake Historical Society	
Crawford County Historical Society Museum	Robinson	Crawford	Southern	Local history		Homepage
Cuneo Museum	Vernon Hills	Lake	Chicago area	Historic house	1914 Mediterranean-style mansion with decorative arts and furnishings	
Dana-Thomas House	Springfield	Sangamon	Central	Historic house	Prairie-style house designed by Frank Lloyd Wright	
Daughters of Union Veterans of the Civil War Museum	Springfield	Sangamon	Central	Civil War	Civil War artifacts including rifles, medals, photographs, currency, drums, uniforms, and letters from soldiers at the front	Homepage
David Adler Music and Arts Center	Libertyville	Lake	Chicago area	Art	Interprets the historic home of architect David Adler, hosts 7 exhibitions per year, ranging from juried exhibitions to group shows	
David Davis Mansion	Bloomington	McLean	Central	Historic house	36-room Italianate villa mansion	
David L. Pierce Art and History Center	Aurora	Kane	Chicago area	Multiple	Local history and art, operated by the City of Aurora, exhibits by the Aurora Historical Society and the Aurora Public Art Commission	
David Strawn Art Gallery	Jacksonville	Morgan	Central	Art	Operated by the Art Association of Jacksonville, exhibits of local art	Homepage
Deere-Wiman House	Moline	Rock Island	Quad Cities	Historic house	1872 home of Charles Deere, operated by the William Butterworth Foundation	Homepage
Deerfield Historic Village	Deerfield	Lake	Chicago area	Open air	Operated by the Deerfield Area Historical Society, includes 1837 log home, mid-19th-century farmhouse, one-room schoolhouse, 1900 kitchen, antique carriages and farm equipment	Homepage
DePaul Art Museum	Chicago	Cook	Chicago area	Art	Part of DePaul University on the Lincoln Park campus	Homepage
Dewitt County Museum	Clinton	Dewitt	Central	Open air	Includes the C. H. Moore Homestead, telephone exhibit and farm museum	
Dickson Mounds Museum	Lewistown	Fulton	Western	Native American	Archaeological artifacts and history of the Native American settlement site and burial mound complex	
Dietrich Friedrichs House Museum	Mount Prospect	Cook	Chicago area	Local history	Operated by the Mount Prospect Historical Society, 1906 farmhouse and education center	Homepage
Dillon Home Museum	Sterling	Whiteside	Northern Illinois	Historic house	19th-century period house, includes the Sterling-Rock Falls Historical Society Museum in the carriage house	
Discovery Center Museum	Rockford	Winnebago	Northern Illinois	Science	Hands-on science and arts exhibits	Homepage
Discovery Depot Children's Museum	Galesburg	Knox	Western	Children's		Homepage
Dixon Telegraph Museum	Dixon	Lee	Northern Illinois	Media	History of the newspaper and its role in the history of Dixon	
Dollhouses Then & Now	Quincy	Adams	Western	Toy	Over 70 vintage furnished doll houses from the 1920s on	
Donald E. Stephens Museum of Hummels	Rosemont	Cook	Chicago area	Decorative arts	M.I. Hummel, ANRI and Goebel figurines collected by Donald Stephens	Homepage
Donley's Wild West Town	Union	McHenry	Northern Illinois	History	Western theme park and museum	Homepage
Dowling House	Galena	Jo Daviess	Northern Illinois	Historic house	1820s house and trading post, exhibits of city history	
Downers Grove Museum	Downers Grove	DuPage	Chicago area	Local history	Located in Wandschneider Park, includes the Victorian-period Blodgett House, the pioneer-period Blodgett House, and barn exhibits	Homepage
Douglas County Museum	Tuscola	Douglas	Central	Local history		Homepage
Dr. Charles M. Wright House	Altamont	Effingham	Central	Historic house	Late 19th-century brick mansion	
Dr. Richard Eells House	Quincy	Adams	Western	Historic house	1835 house that was a site on the Underground Railroad, open for group tours and for special events	
Draewell Gallery at Judson University	Elgin	Kane	Chicago area	Art	Located in the Harm A. Weber Academic Center	Homepage
Driehaus Museum	Chicago	Cook	Chicago area	Art	Decorative arts, design and architecture of Gilded Age America and the Art Nouveau era	
Dundee Township Historical Society Museum	West Dundee	Kane	Chicago area	Local history		Homepage
DuPage Children's Museum	Naperville	DuPage	Chicago area	Children's	Hands-on exploration integrating art, math, and science	Homepage
DuPage County Historical Museum	Wheaton	DuPage	Chicago area	Local history	Operated by the DuPage County Historical Society, county history, period displays, model railroad	
Durant House	St. Charles	Kane	Northern Illinois	Historic house	Restored 1840s prairie farmstead, operated by the Preservation Partners of the Fox Valley	
DuSable Museum of African American History	Chicago	Cook	Chicago area	African-American	History, art and culture of African-American DuSable residents	
Earth & Space Science Museum	Elizabeth	Jo Daviess	Northern Illinois	Science	Operated by the Planetary Studies Foundation, includes dinosaur bones, fossils, and the U.S. space program	Homepage
Easley Pioneer Museum	Ipava	Fulton	Western	Local history	Includes history of World War II Army Camp Ellis	
Eastern Illinois University Lab School Museum	Charleston	Coles	Central	Institutional Educational History	Depicts the history of the Laboratory School from 1899 to 1974	Homepage
Edgar Lee Masters Home	Petersburg	Menard	Central	Biographical	Home of poet Edgar Lee Masters	
Edgewater Historical Society Museum	Chicago	Cook	Chicago area	Local history	History of the Edgewater, Chicago community	Homepage
Edwards Place	Springfield	Sangamon	Central	Historic house	Restored 1850s period house with ties to famous Illinois political figures, includes art gallery of the Springfield Art Association	
Edwardsville Children's Museum	Edwardsville	Madison	Metro-East	Children's		Homepage
Elgin Community College Visual and Performing Arts Center	Elgin	Kane	Chicago area	Art	Changing exhibits in three fine arts galleries	Homepage
Elgin Fire Barn No. 5 Museum	Elgin	Kane	Chicago area	Firefighting	Early 20th-century former firehouse, includes photos, helmets, badges, uniforms, a hand-drawn hose cart, an 1869 horse-drawn Silsby Steamer, motorized vehicles	
Elgin History Museum	Elgin	Kane	Chicago area	Local history	Includes exhibits about the Elgin National Watch Company and American Indian artifacts	
Elgin Public Museum	Elgin	Kane	Chicago area	Natural history	Includes Mazon Creek fossils, Native American lifeways, Ice Age mammals, the Fox River ecosystem, the La Salle Expeditions, endangered species, rocks and minerals	
Elihu Benjamin Washburne House	Galena	Jo Daviess	Northern Illinois	Historic house	Mid-19th-century period home	
Elijah Iles House	Springfield	Sangamon	Central	Historic house	1830s house with original interior, includes Museum of Springfield History	
Elijah P. Curtis House	Metropolis	Massac	Southern	Historic house	Late 19th-century house, operated by the Massac County Historical Society	
Elizabeth History Museum	Elizabeth	Jo Daviess	Northern Illinois	Local history	Operated by the Elizabeth Historical Society	Homepage
Elk Grove Historical Museum	Elk Grove Village	Cook	Chicago area	Open air	Includes schoolhouse, farmhouse, barn, privy and chicken coop	Homepage
Ellwood House Museum	DeKalb	DeKalb	Northern Illinois	Historic house	1879 Victorian mansion	Homepage
Elmhurst Art Museum	Elmhurst	DuPage	Chicago area	Art	Art, architecture and design, includes house designed by Ludwig Mies van der Rohe	Homepage
Elmhurst History Museum	Elmhurst	DuPage	Chicago area	Local history	Operated by the City of Elmhurst, supported by the Elmhurst Heritage Foundation	Homepage
Elsah Museum	Elsah	Jersey	Central	Local history		
Empire Township Historical Museum	Le Roy	McLean	Central	Local history	Located in the J.T. and E.J. Crumbaugh Library	
Erlander Museum	Rockford	Winnebago	Northern Illinois	Ethnic	Operated by the Swedish Historical Society of Rockford, 19th-century house that reflects area Swedish heritage	Homepage
Ernest Hemingway's Birthplace and Museum	Oak Park	Cook	Chicago area	Biographical	1890s period Victorian home and separate museum about author Ernest Hemingway	Homepage
Essley-Noble Museum	Aledo	Mercer	Quad Cities	Local history	Operated by the Mercer County Historical Society	Homepage
Ethnic Heritage Museum	Rockford	Winnebago	Northern Illinois	Culture	Heritage and culture of six local immigrant groups: Irish, Italians, African-Americans, Polish, Lithuanians and Hispanics	Homepage
Eureka College Burgess Hall Gallery	Eureka	Woodford	Central	Art		
Everett Galleries at Monmouth College	Monmouth	Warren	Central	Art	Located in Hewes Library	Homepage
Exploration Station	Bourbonnais	Kankakee	Chicago area	Children's		Homepage
Fabyan Villa Museum	Geneva	Kane	Northern Illinois	Historic house	House redesigned by Frank Lloyd Wright, also Japanese garden, operated by the Preservation Partners of the Fox Valley	
Fabyan Windmill	Geneva	Kane	Northern Illinois	Mill	Authentic, working Dutch windmill dating from the 1850s	
Fairfield Early History Museum	Fairfield	Wayne	Southern	Local history	Operated by the Wayne Historical Society	website
Farnsworth House	Plano	Kendall	Northern Illinois	Historic house	1940s home designed and constructed by Ludwig Mies van der Rohe	
Ferguson Art Gallery at Concordia University Chicago	River Forest	Cook	Chicago area	Art	Located in Kretzman Hall, 5 to 6 exhibitions of works of established and up-and-coming Chicago-area artists	Homepage
Fern Dell Museum	Newark	Kendall	Northern Illinois	Local history	Operated by the Fern Dell Historic Association	Homepage
Fayette County Museum	Vandalia	Fayette	Southern	Local history	Period displays	
Field Museum of Natural History	Chicago	Cook	Chicago area	Natural history	Animals, insects, dinosaurs and fossils, history and the evolution of life on Earth, Ancient Egypt, gems and minerals, DNA, Native Americans	
Fire Museum of Greater Chicago	Chicago	Cook	Chicago area	Firefighting		Homepage
First Division Museum at Cantigny	Wheaton	DuPage	Chicago area	Military	History of the 1st Infantry Division from the Revolutionary War to the present, located at Cantigny	
Flagg Creek Museum	Burr Ridge	Cook	Chicago area	Local history	Operated by the Flagg Creek Heritage Society	Homepage
Flagg Township Museum	Rochelle	Ogle	Northern Illinois	Local history	Operated by the Flagg Township Historical Society in the former town hall	
Fort de Chartres	Prairie du Rocher	Randolph	Southern	Military	Reconstructed mid-18th-century fort	
Fort Hill Heritage Museum	Mundelein	Lake	Chicago area	Local history	Operated by the Historical Society of Fort Hill Country	Information
Fort Massac State Park	Metropolis	Massac	Southern	Military	Reconstructed colonial and early National-era fort	
Fourth St. Museum	Chillicothe	Peoria	Central	Local history	Operated by the Chillicothe Historical Society	Homepage
Fox River Trolley Museum	South Elgin	Kane	Chicago area	Transportation	Electric trolley cars	
Foreman Depot Museum	Vienna	Johnson	Southern	Local history	Local and railroad history and art gallery	
Frances Willard House	Evanston	Cook	Chicago area	Historic house	19th-century home of Frances Willard and her family that was the longtime headquarters of the Woman's Christian Temperance Union	
Franklin County Jail Museum	Benton	Franklin	Southern	Local history	Operated by the Franklin County Historic Preservation Society	
Franklin County Garage Museum	Benton	Franklin	Southern	Automobile	Operated by the Franklin County Historic Preservation Society	Homepage
Franklin Creek Grist Mill	Franklin Grove	Lee	Northern Illinois	Mill	Includes 1930s working mill and area watershed displays	Homepage
Frank Lloyd Wright Home and Studio	Oak Park	Cook	Chicago area	Historic house	Restored 1909-period residence of Frank Lloyd Wright	
Frederick Francis Woodland Palace	Kewanee	Henry	Western	Historic house	1890 house with advanced engineering	Homepage
Freeport Art Museum	Freeport	Stephenson	Northern Illinois	Art	Exhibits art from its collection as well as regional contemporary artists	Homepage
Fryxell Geology Museum	Rock Island	Rock Island	Quad Cities	Natural history	Part of Augustana College, dinosaur, fossil, rock and mineral specimens	https://www.augustana.edu/locations/fryxell-geology-museum
Fulkerson Mansion & Farm Museum	Jerseyville	Jersey	Metro-East	Historic house	Civil War period mansion and agriculture tools and equipment	information
Fulton (Martin House) Museum	Fulton	Whiteside	Northern Illinois	Local history	Operated by the Fulton Historical Society	Homepage
Galena & U.S. Grant Museum	Galena	Jo Daviess	Northern Illinois	Local history	Operated by the Galena - Jo Daviess County Historical Society	Homepage
Galesburg Civic Art Center	Galesburg	Knox	Western	Art		Homepage
Galesburg Railroad Museum	Galesburg	Knox	Western	Railway		
Garfield Farm and Inn Museum	St. Charles	Kane	Northern Illinois	Farm	1840s period farmhouse, barn and outbuildings	
Gaylord Building	Lockport	Will	Chicago area	Transportation	Impact of the Illinois & Michigan Canal on the area	
Geneseo Historical Museum	Geneseo	Henry	Western	Local history	Operated by the Geneseo Historical Association	Homepage
Geneva History Museum	Geneva	Kane	Northern Illinois	Local history	Operated by the Geneva Historical Society	Homepage
George Clayson House Museum	Palatine	Cook	Chicago area	Local history	Operated by the Palatine Historical Society	
George R. Letourneau Home Museum	Bourbonnais	Kankakee	Chicago area	Historic house	Operated by the Bourbonnais Grove Historical Society	Homepage
German Valley Historical Society Museum	German Valley	Stephenson	Northern Illinois	Local history		website
Giertz Gallery	Champaign	Champaign	Champaign–Urbana metropolitan area	Art	Part of Parkland College	Homepage
Glen Carbon Heritage Museum	Glen Carbon	Madison	Metro-East	Local history		Homepage
Glencoe Historical Society	Glencoe	Cook	Chicago area	Local history	Includes the Eklund Museum and Garden, the Research Center, and the Ravine Bluffs Cottage	Homepage
Glenview History Center	Glenview	Cook	Chicago area	Local history	Operated by the Glenview Area Historical Society, includes the 1864 Farmhouse Museum and the Hibbard Library, a replica of the Victorian coach house	Homepage
Glessner House Museum	Chicago	Cook	Chicago area	Historic house	Romanesque-style house designed by Henry Hobson Richardson with English arts and crafts-style home furnishings and decorative arts	
Governor Duncan Mansion	Jacksonville	Morgan	Central	Historic house	Mid-19th-century period home of the state's fifth governor	
Governor Oglesby Mansion	Decatur	Macon	Central	Historic house	Operated by the Macon County Conservation District, 1870s Italianate style home of 3-time Illinois Governor, U.S. Senator and Civil War General Richard J. Oglesby	
Grand Army of the Republic Memorial Museum	Springfield	Sangamon	Central	Civil War	Includes GAR memorabilia, artifacts, papers, diaries, photos, weapons, journals	Homepage
Grant Hall Museum	Ingleside	Lake	Chicago area	Local history	Operated by the Fox Lake-Grant Township Area Historical Society	Homepage
Graue Mill and Museum	Oak Brook	DuPage	Chicago area	Mill	Operating waterwheel grist mill and homestead	
Gray Gallery at Quincy University	Quincy	Adams	Western	Art	Part of the Brenner Library, exhibitions by nationally noted and regional artists, as well as works by students and faculty	
Grayslake Historical Society Museum	Grayslake	Lake	Chicago area	Local history		Homepage
Great Lakes Naval Museum	Great Lakes	Lake	Chicago area	Military	Exhibits about the life of a U.S. Navy sailor, United States Marine Corps Recruit Training and the Naval Station Great Lakes	
Greater Saint Louis Air & Space Museum	Cahokia	St. Clair	Metro-East	Aviation	Historic aircraft, aviation history	
Gretna Station Museum and Caboose	Carol Stream	DuPage	Chicago area	Railroad	Operated by the Carol Stream Historical Society	Homepage
Gridley Telephone Museum	Gridley	McLean	Central	Technology	Evolution of communication services in rural Illinois	Homepage
Grosse Point Lighthouse	Evanston	Cook	Chicago area	Lighthouse	1873 lighthouse open for tours	
Grove National Historic Landmark	Glenview	Cook	Chicago area	Multiple	Includes 1856 Gothic Revival house, log cabin, Native American longhouse, one-room schoolhouse, Grove Interpretive Center with natural history exhibits, Wetland Greenhouse	
Grundy County Historical Society Museum	Morris	Grundy	Northern Illinois	Local history	Grundy genealogy archives, Chief Shabbona, Mazon fossils, Tully Monster, Morris historic stores, quilts, Northwestern gumball machines	Homepage
Hanna House Museum	Fairfield	Wayne	Southern	Historic house	Operated by the Wayne Historical Society	website
Hard Days Nite Bed & Breakfast & Beatles Mini-Museum	Benton	Franklin	Southern	Biographical	Room where George Harrison slept when in town, includes Beatles memorabilia	Homepage
Harris Agricultural Museum	Atwood	Douglas	Central	Agriculture	Agricultural vehicles and equipment including soil, tillage, harvesting and planting equipment, replicas of a 1920s farmstead kitchen, grain elevator office and blacksmith shop	Homepage
Harrison/Bruce Historical Village	Carterville	Williamson	Southern	Open air	Operated by John A. Logan College, includes a school, 19th-century house and two log cabins	Homepage
Hawthorne Works Museum	Cicero	Cook	Chicago area	Technology	Part of Morton College, history and products of the Western Electric company	
Heath Center Gallery at John Wood Community College	Quincy	Adams	Western	Art	Located in the lower level of the Paul Heath Community Education and Fine Arts Center	
Hedges Station	Winfield	DuPage	Chicago area	Local history	Operated by the Winfield Historical Society	Homepage
Hegeler Carus Mansion	LaSalle	LaSalle	Northern Illinois	Historic house	1876 Victorian-period mansion	
Henderson County Museum	Raritan	Henderson	Western	Local history	Includes schoolrooms, farm kitchens, clothing and farm implements	
Henry County Museum	Bishop Hill	Henry	Western	Local history	Operated by the Henry County Historical Society	Homepage
Henry N. Barkhausen Cache River Wetlands Center	Cypress	Johnson	Southern	Natural history	Animals, plants and ecosystem of the Cache River Wetlands and the Cypress Creek National Wildlife Refuge	
Henry School	Polo	Ogle	Northern Illinois	School	Operated by the Polo Historical Society, 1878 country school with local history displays	Homepage
Henry Thomas Museum	Wyanet	Bureau	Northern Illinois	Local history	Open by appointment, Bureau County Township and early settler Thomas Family memorabilia	
Heritage Canyon	Fulton	Whiteside	Northern Illinois	Open air		Homepage
Heritage Farm Museum	Okawville	Ogle	Northern Illinois	Historic house	Three historic homes: the Frank Schlosser Complex, the Dr. Robert C. Poos Home, and the Joseph Schlosser Home	
Heritage House Museum	Salem	Washington	Southern	Historic house	Mid-19th-century house, open by appointment	
Heritage Museum	Olney	Richland	Southern	Historic house	Late 19th-century Victorian house, open by appointment with the Richland Heritage Museum Foundation	
Highland Park Historical Society Museum	Highland Park	Lake	Chicago area	Local history		Homepage
Hinsdale History Museum	Hinsdale	DuPage	Chicago area	Local history	Operated by the Hinsdale Historical Society	Homepage
Historic Auto Attractions	Roscoe	Winnebago	Northern Illinois	Automotive	Exhibits include famous cars, a wide array of classic Hollywood movie memorabilia, and a section dedicated to John F. Kennedy	Homepage
Historic Nauvoo	Nauvoo	Hancock	Central	Open air	Includes over 30 historic sites from the 1839-1846 time period, history of the Church of Jesus Christ of Latter-day Saints	Homepage
Hoiles-Davis Museum	Greenville	Bond	Southern	Local history	Operated by the Bond County Historical Society	Homepage
Holt House	Monmouth	Warren	Central	Historic house	House where Pi Beta Phi fraternity was founded	Homepage
Homestead Prairie Farm	Decatur	Macon	Central	Historic house	Operated by the Macon County Conservation District, exhibits focus on rural life on the Grand Prairie of Illinois in the 1860s	
Horse and Buggy Museum	Biggsville	Henderson	Western	Transportation	Horse-drawn vehicles and farm equipment	Homepage
Hoosier Grove Museum	Streamwood	Cook	Chicago area	School	Operated by the Streamwood Historical Society	Homepage
Hull House	Chicago	Cook	Chicago area	Historic house	Part of University of Illinois, former settlement house and museum about Jane Addams and activities at Hull House	
Hume Carnegie Museum	Mendota	LaSalle	Northern Illinois	Local history	Operated by the Mendota Museum & Historical Society, includes Wild Bill Hickok collection	Homepage
Hutson Memorial Village	Hutsonville	Crawford	Southern	Open air	Six log cabins recreating homestead life in 1812, operated by the Hutsonville Historical Society	
Illinois Amish Museum	Arcola	Douglas	Central	Cultural	Amish religion and lifestyle including buggies, barns, homes, quilts, weddings, Anabaptist history	Homepage
Illinois Aviation Museum	Bolingbrook	Will	Chicago area	Aviation	Collection of restored and replica aircraft	
Illinois Executive Mansion	Springfield	Sangamon	Central	Historic house	Governor's official residence	
Illinois Fire Museum	Springfield	Sangamon	Central	Firefighting	Open by appointment, located at the Old Firehouse on Illinois State Fairgrounds	Homepage
Illinois Holocaust Museum and Education Center	Skokie	Cook	Chicago area	History		
Illinois Mennonite Heritage Center	Metamora	Woodford	Western	Open air	Faith and life of Mennonites in Illinois, including worship, home life and agriculture	Homepage
Illinois Oil Field Museum	Oblong	Crawford	Southern	Industry	Oil industry tools and equipment, Illinois Basin and surrounding areas of the oil boom era and the oil industry of that area	
Illinois Railway Museum	Union	McHenry	Northern Illinois	Railway	Includes steam, diesel and electric trains and heritage train rides	
Illinois School for the Deaf Alumni Association Museum	Jacksonville	Morgan	Central	Education	History of the Illinois School for the Deaf	Homepage
Illinois State Capitol	Springfield	Sangamon	Central	Historic site		
Illinois State Military Museum	Springfield	Sangamon	Central	Military	History of the Illinois National Guard	Homepage
Illinois State Museum	Springfield	Sangamon	Central	Multiple	State natural history, history, culture and art	
Illinois State Police Heritage Foundation Museum	Springfield	Sangamon	Central	Law enforcement	Uniforms, badges, photographs, vintage squad cars	Homepage
Illinois State University College of Fine Arts Galleries	Normal	McLean	Central	Art	Located at Uptown Station	Homepage
Illinois Wesleyan University - Merwin & Wakeley Galleries	Bloomington	McLean	Central	Art	Located in the Ames School of Art	Homepage
Ingrams Pioneer Log Cabin Village	Kinmundy	Marion	Southern	Open air	19th-century period log cabin village	
Intuit: The Center for Intuitive and Outsider Art	Chicago	Cook	Chicago area	Art	Intuitive and outsider art gallery	
International Museum of Surgical Science	Chicago	Cook	Chicago area	Medical	Operated by the International College of Surgeons, history of primitive and modern healing practices of Eastern and Western civilizations	
International Servant Leaders Museum - Dehkhoda Educational Foundation	Morton Grove	Cook	Chicago area	International Servant Leaders	Exhibits on international servant leaders (Martin Luther King Jr., Desmond Tutu, Jane Goodall, and many more.	
Irish American Heritage Center	Chicago	Cook	Chicago area	Cultural		
ISM Chicago Gallery	Chicago	Cook	Chicago area	Art	Changing exhibits of fine and decorative arts	
Isle a la Cache Museum	Romeoville	Will	Chicago area	History	French fur trade and Native American life	
Italian American Veterans Museum	Stone Park	Cook	Chicago area	Military	Italian-American involvement in the defense of America from the Revolutionary War to the present	Homepage
Itasca Historical Depot Museum	Itasca	DuPage	Chicago area	Railroad	Operated by the Itasca Historical Society, local history, area railroad history, model train layout	Homepage
Jackson County Historical Society Museum	Murphysboro	Jackson	Southern	Local history		website
James Millikin Homestead	Decatur	Macon	Central	Historic house	1870s mansion, owned by Millikin University	
Jarrett Prairie Center	Byron	Ogle	Northern Illinois	Natural history	Includes natural history museum and observatory, operated by the Byron Forest Preserve District	Homepage
Jarrot Mansion	Cahokia	St. Clair	Metro-East	Historic house	Opened periodically for special events	
Jefferson County Historical Village	Mt. Vernon	Jefferson	Southern	Open air	Operated by the Jefferson County Historical Society. Includes Schweinfurth Museum with historical collections, and village with log homes, log church, 1820 Jail, windmill & grist mill, and working blacksmith shop and printing shop	Homepage
Jersey County Historical Society Museum	Jerseyville	Jersey	Metro-East	Historic house	Located in the Victorian Cheney Mansion, also local history exhibits	Homepage
J. H. Hawes Grain Elevator Museum	Atlanta	Logan	Central	Agriculture	1904 grain elevator	
John A. Logan College Museum	Carterville	Williamson	Southern	Local history	Southern Illinois’ visual arts, cultural heritage and natural history, part of John A. Logan College	
John A. Logan Museum	Murphysboro	Jackson	Southern	Biographical	Life and impact of John A. Logan, Civil War general, located in the Christopher C. Bullar House	Homepage
John Deere Historic Site	Grand Detour	Ogle	Northern Illinois	Historic house	Recreated blacksmith shop and 1836 pioneer house	
John Deere Pavilion	Moline	Rock Island	Quad Cities	Agriculture	John Deere tractors and farm equipment	
John C. Flanagan House Museum	Peoria	Peoria	Central	Historic house	Mid-19th-century house, operated by the Peoria Historical Society	
John Marshall House Museum	Old Shawneetown	Gallatin	Southern	Historic house	Reconstructed 19th-century house and bank	
John Shastid House	Pittsfield	Pike	Central	Historic house	Operated by the Pike County Historical Society, 1838 house, tours by appointment	
John Wood Mansion	Quincy	Adams	Western	Historic house	Operated by the Historical Society of Quincy and Adams County, 1830s mansion home of the state's 12th governor	
Joliet Area Historical Museum	Joliet	Will	Chicago area	Local history	Includes life-size replica depicting the building of the Illinois Michigan Canal, period store displays, Route 66	
Jones Hous	Pontiac	Livingston	Central	Historic house	Open by appointment and for events, restored 1857 house	
Joseph F. Glidden Homestead & Historical Center	DeKalb	DeKalb	Northern Illinois	Historic house	Mid-19th-century home of the inventor of barbed wire Joseph Glidden	
Joseph Smith Historic Site	Nauvoo	Hancock	Central	Open air	Operated by the Community of Christ. Tour of several sites including Nauvoo House, Joseph Smith Homestead, Mansion House, Red Brick Store	
Jubilee College State Historic Site	Peoria	Peoria	Central	Historic site	Former pioneer college, currently closed	
Kaeser Park	Highland	Madison	Metro-East	Historic house	Operated by the Highland Historical Society. Includes log cabin building museum, local history exhibits	Homepage
Kankakee County Museum	Kankakee	Kanakee	Northern Illinois	Open air	Complex includes main museum with local history exhibits, Dr. A.L. Small House, a Victorian historic house, and Taylor School House	Homepage
Kankakee Railroad Museum	Kankakee	Kankakee	Northern Illinois	Railroad		Homepage
Karpeles Manuscript Library Museum	Rock Island	Rock Island	Quad Cities	History	Located in the former First Church of Christ, Scientist, exhibits from its collections of original manuscripts and documents	
Kenilworth Historical Society Museum	Kenilworth	Cook	Chicago area	Local history		Homepage
Kent Fuller Air Station Prairie	Glenview	Cook	Chicago area	Natural history	32-acre (130,000 m^{2}) tall-grass prairie and Evelyn Pease Tyner Interpretive Center with prairie environment exhibits and education programs	Homepage
Kewanee Historical Society Museum	Kewanee	Henry	Western	Local history	Officially the Robert & Marcella Richards Museum	Homepage
Kibbe Museum	Carthage	Hancock	Central	Local history		Homepage
Kidzeum of Health and Science	Springfield	Sangamon	Central	Children's		Homepage
Kirkland Fine Arts Center	Decatur	Macon	Central	Art	Part of Millikin University, includes Perkinson Art Gallery and Lower Gallery	Homepage
Kishwaukee College Art Gallery	Malta	DeKalb	Northern Illinois	Art		Homepage
Kline Creek Farm	Winfield	DuPage	Chicago area	Farm	1890s living history farm and farmhouse	Homepage
Knox County Museum	Knox	Knox	Western	Local history		Homepage
Koehnline Museum of Art	Des Plaines	Cook	Chicago area	Art	Part of Oakton Community College	Homepage
Kohl Children's Museum	Glenview	Cook	Chicago area	Children's		
Krannert Art Museum	Champaign	Champaign	Champaign–Urbana metropolitan area	Art	Part of University of Illinois at Urbana–Champaign, all periods of art from ancient Egyptian to contemporary photography	
Kruse House Museum	West Chicago	DuPage	Chicago area	Historic house	Operated by the West Chicago Historical Society, 1917 period home	Homepage
L. Haas Store Museum	Carmi	White	Southern	Local history	Operated by the White County Historical Society	
Labor & Industry Museum	Belleville	St. Clair	Metro-East	Industry	Tools, photos and exhibits of local industries, businesses, workers and products	Homepage
La Grange Area Historical Society Museum	La Grange	Cook	Chicago area	Local history	Located in the Samuel Vial House	Homepage
Lake Bluff History Museum	Lake Bluff	Lake	Chicago area	Local history		Homepage
Lake County Discovery Museum	Libertyville	Lake	Chicago area	Multiple	Local art, history and popular culture	
Lake Forest College Art Galleries	Lake Forest	Lake	Chicago area	Local history	Sonnenschein Gallery, Albright Room and Deerpath Student Gallery	Homepage
Lake Forest-Lake Bluff Historical Society Museum	Lake Forest	Lake	Chicago area	Art	Museum of local history	Homepage
Lamon House	Danville	Vermilion	Central	Historic house	Operated by the Vermilion County Museum Society	Homepage
LaSalle County Museum	Utica	LaSalle	Northern Illinois	Open air	Includes local history museum with Native American and period displays, barn with agriculture equipment, school and blacksmith shop	Homepage
Latvian Folk Art Museum	Chicago	Cook	Chicago area	Ethnic	Operated by the Chicago Latvian Association, Latvian folk art	Homepage
Latzer Homestead	Highland	Madison	Metro-East	Historic house	Operated by the Highland Historical Society	Homepage
Laura A. Sprague Gallery	Joliet	Will	Chicago area	Art	Art gallery of Joliet Junior College, located on the first floor of J-Building	Homepage
Laurent House	Rockford	Winnebago	Northern Illinois	Historic house	1952 house designed by Frank Lloyd Wright for a person with a disability	
Leaf River Historical Museum	Leaf River	Ogle	Northern Illinois	Local history	Operated by the Leaf River Historical Society	Homepage
Leather Archives and Museum	Chicago	Cook	Chicago area	Sex	Leather, fetishism, sadomasochism, and alternative sexual practices	Homepage
Lederman Science Center	Batavia	Kane	Northern Illinois	Science	Operated by Fermilab, hands-on exhibits for ages 10+	Homepage
Lee-Baker-Hodges House	Carrollton	Greene	Central	Local history	Operated by the Greene County Historical and Genealogical Society	
Lemont Area Historical Society Museum	Lemont	Cook	Chicago area	Local history	Includes general store, schoolroom, stable, medical office, war relics, and other local history displays	
Lena Area Historical Museum	Lena	Stephenson	Northern Illinois	Local history	Operated by the Lena Historical Society	Information
Lewis and Clark State Historic Site	Hartford	Madison	Southern	History	Camp of the Lewis and Clark Expedition from December 1803 to May 1804	
Lincoln Heritage Museum	Lincoln	Logan	Central	Biographical	Part of Lincoln College, life and times of Abraham Lincoln	Homepage
Lincoln Log Cabin State Historic Site	Lerna	Coles	Central	Living	1840s home of Thomas and Sarah Bush Lincoln, father and stepmother of Abraham Lincoln, living history farm	
Lincoln-Douglas Debate Interpretive Center	Quincy	Adams	Western	History	History of the Lincoln–Douglas debates and Quincy's stories of Lincoln and Douglas's friendships and influences in the Quincy area	Homepage
Lincoln Home National Historic Site	Springfield	Sangamon	Central	Historic house	Home that Abraham Lincoln lived in from 1844 to 1861	
Lincoln-era Log Cabin Village	Quincy	Adams	Western	Open air	Four 1800s log cabins, a corn crib, stone smoke house and log church open for exterior viewing	website
Lincoln-Herndon Law Offices State Historic Site	Springfield	Sangamon	Central	Historic site	Restored to 1840s period	
Lincoln-Manahan Home Museum	Sterling	Whiteside	Northern Illinois	Historic house	Operated by the Sterling-Rock Falls Historical Society, 19th-century house where Sheriff William Manahan hosted Abraham Lincoln during his 1856 visit to Sterling	Homepage
Lincoln's New Salem State Historic Site	New Salem	Menard	Central	Open air	Reconstruction of the village where Abraham Lincoln lived in the 1830s	
Lithuanian Museum of Art	Lemont	Cook	Chicago area	Art	Fine and folk art by native and emigrant Lithuanian artists	Homepage
Little Brick House	Vandalia	Fayette	Southern	Historic house	Restored 1860s middle-class home, open by appointment, operated by the Vandalia Historical Society	
Little White School Museum	Oswego	Kendall	Northern Illinois	Local history	Operated by the Oswegoland Heritage Association	Homepage
Livingston County Historical Society's Local History Exhibit	Pontiac	Livingston	Central	Local history	Display in the Livingston County Courthouse	website
Livingston County War Museum	Pontiac	Livingston	Central	Military	Military museum dedicated to honoring central Illinois veterans from World War I to the present	Homepage
Lizzadro Museum of Lapidary Art	Oak Brook	DuPage	Chicago area	Decorative arts	More than 200 pieces of jade and other hard stone decorative carvings, dioramas featuring animals carved from various gem materials, rocks and mineral collections	Homepage
Lockport Gallery	Lockport	Will	Chicago area	Art	Satellite gallery of the Illinois State Museum, changing exhibitions of past and contemporary Illinois artists and artisans	
Loveland Community House and Museum	Dixon	Lee	Northern Illinois	Local history		Homepage
Loyola University Museum of Art	Chicago	Cook	Chicago area	Art	Explores the spiritual in art from all cultures, faiths, and periods; formerly the Martin D'Arcy Museum of Art	
Lyon Farm	Yorkville	Kendall	Northern Illinois	Open air	Operated by the Kendall County Historical Society, opened for special events	Homepage
Macktown Living History Education Center	Rockton	Winnebago	Northern Illinois	Living	1830 - 1846 frontier town	Homepage
Macon County History Museum	Decatur	Macon	Central	Open air	Operated by the Macon County Historical Society, features a prairie village complex	Homepage
Madison County Historical Museum	Edwardsville	Madison	Metro-East	Local history	Operated by the Madison County Historical Society in the John Weir House	
Magnolia Manor	Cairo	Alexander	Southern	Historic house	Late 19th-century period Victorian mansion	
Manhattan Township Historical Museum	Manhattan	Will	Chicago area	Local history	Six rooms of displays and a caboose	
Manteno Historical Society Museum	Manteno	Kankakee	Northern Illinois	Local history	Early 20th-century period displays	Homepage
Marie Louise Olmstead Memorial Museum	Somonauk	DeKalb	Northern Illinois	Local history	Exhibit also includes natural history artifacts	
Marion E. Wade Center	Wheaton	DuPage	Chicago area	Literary	Memorabilia and artifacts from its collections about seven authors from the United Kingdom: C. S. Lewis, J. R. R. Tolkien, G. K. Chesterton, Dorothy L. Sayers, Charles Williams, Owen Barfield, and George MacDonald, and C. S. Lewis's wife, the poet Joy Davidman	
Mary and Leigh Block Museum of Art	Evanston	Cook	Chicago area	Art	Part of Northwestern University, historical and contemporary visual art and culture	
Maryville Heritage Museum	Maryville	Madison	West Central	Local History	Summary Local artifacts covering Village's coal mining, farming, baseball & softball history. Firefighters, police & military memorabilia. Restored 1968 Seagrave Firetruck	Maryvilleilmuseum.com
Matthew T. Scott House	Chenoa	McLean	Central	Historic house	Mid-19th-century period home of town's founder	
McConnell Area Historical Society Museum	McConnell	Stephenson	Northern Illinois	Local history		
McCormick Tribune Bridgehouse & Chicago River Museum	Chicago	Cook	Chicago area	History	Natural, social and cultural history of the Chicago River	Homepage
McDonald's No. 1 Store Museum	Des Plaines	Cook	Chicago area	Food	Recreation of the first McDonald's Restaurant	
McHenry County Historical Society Museum	Union	McHenry	Northern Illinois	Local history	Period displays	Homepage
McKendree University Gallery of Art	Lebanon	St. Clair	Metro-East	Art	Works by students, faculty, alumni and artists from the region	Homepage
McLean County Museum of History	Bloomington	McLean	Central	Local history	Central Illinois history with themes of people, politics, work and farming	
McPike Mansion	Alton	Madison	Metro-East	Historic house		
Medieval Torture Museum	Chicago	Cook	Chicago area	History		
Menard County Historical Society Museum	Petersburg	Menard	Central	Local history		
Metamora Courthouse State Historic Site	Metamora	Woodford	Western	Historic site	Restored to 1850s period, also includes local history exhibits	
Midway Village Museum	Rockford	Winnebago	Northern Illinois	Open air	1890-1910 Victorian village with 24 historical buildings, costumed interpreters, local history exhibits	Homepage
Midwest Museum of Natural History	Sycamore	DeKalb	Northern Illinois	Natural history	Dioramas depicting the natural biomes of North America and Africa	
Mineral Pride Society, Inc. Museum	Mineral	Bureau	Northern Illinois	Local history		Homepage
Mississippi Valley Antique Auto Museum	Quincy	Adams	Western	Automobile	Operated by the Mississippi Valley Historic Auto Club in Quincy Park, may be closing	
Mitchell Museum of the American Indian	Evanston	Cook	Chicago area	Native American		
Money Museum	Chicago	Cook	Chicago area	Numismatic	History of the Federal Reserve and currencies	
Monticello Railway Museum	Monticello	Piatt	Champaign–Urbana metropolitan area	Railroad		
Morrison Heritage Museum	Morrison	Whiteside	Northern Illinois	Local history		
Morton Grove Historical Museum	Morton Grove	Cook	Chicago area	Historic house	Operated by the Morton Grove Historical Society and the Morton Grove Park District in the mid-19th-century period Haupt-Yehl House	Homepage
Mother Rudd Home Museum	Gurnee	Lake	Chicago area	Local history	Operated by the Warren Township Historical Society	Homepage
Mount Pulaski Courthouse State Historic Site	Mount Pulaski	Logan	Central	Historic site	Restored to 1850s period	
Mount Pulaski Township Historical Museum	Mount Pulaski	Logan	Central	Local history	Operated by the Mt. Pulaski Township Historical Society	Homepage
Moweaqua Coal Mine Museum	Moweaqua	Shelby	Central	Mining	Area coal mining, history of the 1932 Moweaqua Coal Mine disaster	Homepage
Museum of Broadcast Communications	Chicago	Cook	Chicago area	Media	Historic and contemporary radio and television content, includes National Radio Hall of Fame	
Museum of Contemporary Art	Chicago	Cook	Chicago area	Art		
Museum of Contemporary Photography	Chicago	Cook	Chicago area	Art		
Museum of Land Surveying	Petersburg	Menard	Central	Other	History and equipment used in land surveying	
Museum of Science and Industry	Chicago	Cook	Chicago area	Science	Exhibits include mining, transportation, period businesses, Earth, farming, energy, inventions	
Museum of the Gilding Arts	Pontiac	Livingston	Central	Art	History, craft, and use of gold and silver leafing in architecture and in decoration	
Museum of the Grand Prairie	Mahomet	Champaign	Champaign–Urbana metropolitan area	Local history	Operated by the Champaign County Forest Preserve District, includes American Indian, pioneer, railroad and Black American exhibits, formerly the Early American Museum	
Museums at Lisle Station Park	Lisle	DuPage	Chicago area	Open air	Includes 19th-century period displays at the Lisle Depot Museum, Netzley/Yender Farmhouse, Beaubien Tavern and blacksmith shop	Homepage
MY Garage Museum	Effingham	Effingham	Southern	Automotive	Automotive collectibles and memorabilia, rare Corvettes and Volkswagens	Homepage
Naper Settlement	Naperville	DuPage	Chicago area	Open air	19th-century historic museum village	
Nathan Manilow Sculpture Park	University Park	Will	Chicago area	Art	Outdoor contemporary sculpture park, part of Governors State University	Homepage
National Great Rivers Museum	East Alton	Madison	Metro-East	Maritime	Operated by the U.S. Army Corps of Engineers, adjacent to Melvin Price Locks and Dam	Homepage, information, Further information
National Hellenic Museum	Chicago	Cook	Chicago area	Cultural	Greek history, art and culture and the Greek immigrant experience	
National Italian American Sports Hall of Fame	Chicago	Cook	Chicago area	Hall of fame		
National Museum of Mexican Art	Chicago	Cook	Chicago area	Art	Mexican, Latino, and Chicano art and culture	
National Museum of Puerto Rican Arts and Culture	Chicago	Cook	Chicago area	Ethnic	Arts and culture of the Puerto Rican people and of the Puerto Ricans in Chicago	
National Museum of Ship Models and Sea History	Sadorus	Champaign	Champaign–Urbana metropolitan area	Maritime	Ship models from around the world and throughout history	
National Road Interpretive Center	Vandalia	Fayette	Southern	Transportation	History of the National Road at its western terminus	Homepage
National Shrine of St Therese	Darien	DuPage	Chicago area	Religious	Roman Catholic shrine and museum about Thérèse of Lisieux	
National Veterans Art Museum	Chicago	Cook	Chicago area	Art	Art produced by veterans	
Naval Air Station Glenview Museum	Glenview	Cook	Chicago area	Aviation	Aviation and the history of Naval Air Station Glenview, operated by the Glenview Hangar One Foundation	Homepage
Nehring Gallery	DeKalb	DeKalb	Northern Illinois	Culture	Exhibits gallery of the Nehring Center for Culture and Tourism	
Newberry Library	Chicago	Cook	Chicago area	Library	Free changing exhibits of art, culture and history drawn from its collections.	
The Next Picture Show	Dixon	Lee	Northern Illinois	Art	Non-profit fine arts center	Homepage
Niles Historical Museum	Niles	Cook	Chicago area	Local history	Operated by the Niles Historical Society	Homepage
Norris University Center - Dittmar Gallery	Evanston	Cook	Chicago area	Art	Student-run gallery of Northwestern University, works of emerging and underrepresented artists from the Chicago area and the Midwest	
Northbrook History Museum	Northbrook	Cook	Chicago area	Local history	Operated by the Northbrook Historical Society, changing exhibits of local history and re-created 1890s Shermerville home	Homepage
Northwest Territory Historic Center	Dixon	Lee	Northern Illinois	Local history	Includes exhibits on Ronald Reagan	Homepage
Norwood Park Historical Society Museum	Chicago	Cook	Chicago area	Local history	Period displays about Norwood Park community, located in the Noble-Seymour-Crippen House	
Norsk Museum	Norway	LaSalle	Northern Illinois	Ethnic	Norwegian culture and arts of area settlers	website
North Central College Galleries	Naperville	DuPage	Chicago area	Art	Oesterle Library Gallery and Schoenherr Gallery in the Fine Arts Center	Homepage
Northern Illinois Fire Museum	Marengo	McHenry	Chicago area	Firefighting	Planned museum	Homepage
NIU Art Museum	DeKalb	DeKalb	Northern Illinois	Art	Part of Northern Illinois University, focus is contemporary art	Homepage
O'Connor Art Gallery at Dominican University	River Forest	Cook	Chicago area	Art	Located in Lewis Hall	Homepage
O'Fallon Historical Society Museum	O'Fallon	St. Clair	Metro-East	Local history		Homepage
Ogle County Historical Society Museum	Oregon	Ogle	Northern Illinois	Historic house	Also known as the Nash Home and Museum, 1880s period house	Homepage
Old Courthouse Museum	Watseka	Iroquois	Central	Local history	Operated by the Iroquois County Historical Society	
Old Lincoln Courtroom & Museum	Beardstown	Cass	Western	Historic site	Courtroom where Abraham Lincoln defended Duff Armstrong in the famous Almanac trial	Homepage
Old Market House	Galena	Jo Daviess	Northern Illinois	Local history	History of the mid-19th-century former market house	
Old Settlers' Log Cabin	Dixon	Lee	Northern Illinois	Historic house	Operated by the Lee County Historical and Genealogical Society for events	Homepage
Old Six Mile Museum	Granite City	Madison	Metro-East	Historic house	Located in the Emmert-Zippel House	
Old State Capitol State Historic Site	Springfield	Sangamon	Central	History	Restored to 1860s period	
Oquawka Museum	Oquawka	Henderson	Western	Local history	Open by appointment	
Oriental Institute	Chicago	Cook	Chicago area	Archaeology	Part of the University of Chicago, exhibits focus on history, art, and archaeology of the ancient Near East	
Orpheum Children's Science Museum	Champaign	Champaign	Champaign–Urbana metropolitan area	Science		
Ottawa Historical and Scouting Heritage Museum	Ottawa	LaSalle	Northern Illinois	Scouting	History and memorabilia of the Boy Scouts, Girl Scouts and Camp Fire Guides	Homepage
Owen Lovejoy Homestead	Princeton	Bureau	Northern Illinois	Historic house	Former station on the Underground Railroad	
Owen P. Miles Museum	Mount Carroll	Carroll	Northern Illinois	Historic house	Operated by the Carroll County Historical Society	
Paulson Agriculture Museum of Argyle	Caledonia	Winnebago	Northern Illinois	Agriculture	Antique agriculture equipment, tractors, cast iron implement seats, windmills, washing machines	Homepage
Pearson Museum	Springfield	Sangamon	Central	Medical	Part of Southern Illinois University School of Medicine, showcases the history of medicine, health care, nursing, dentistry, and pharmacy from all cultures and eras	Homepage
Pecatonica Heritage Museum	Pecatonica	Winnebago	Northern Illinois	Local history	Located in a historic grain elevator	Homepage
Chicago Academy of Sciences/Peggy Notebaert Nature Museum	Chicago	Cook	Chicago area	Natural history	Natural history of the Chicago region	
Peoria Riverfront Museum	Peoria	Peoria	Central	Multiple	Fine art, decorative arts, folk art, ethnographic art, natural history, local history	
Perry County Jail Museum	Pinckneyville	Perry	Southern	Local history	Operated by the Perry County Historical Society	
Perry Farm Park	Bourbonnais	Kankakee	Chicago area	Farm	170-acre park with living history Perry Farm and house	
Pettengill-Morron House	Peoria	Peoria	Central	Historic house	Victorian-period house, operated by the Peoria Historical Society	
Piatt County Museum	Monticello	Piatt	Champaign–Urbana metropolitan area	Local history	Includes agricultural equipment and household items, civil war artifacts, clothing, quilts, dolls and toy trains	Homepage
Pick Museum of Anthropology	DeKalb	DeKalb	Northern Illinois	Anthropology	Part of Northern Illinois University, formally known as the James B. and Rosalyn L. Pick Museum of Anthropology	Homepage
Pierre Menard Home State Historic Site	Ellis Grove	Randolph	Southern	Historic house	1810 French Creole-style home of Pierre Menard, the first lieutenant governor of Illinois	
Pike County Historical Society Museum	Pittsfield	Pike	Central	Local history		
Pioneer Sholes School	St. Charles	Kane	Northern Illinois	School	1900-period one-room schoolhouse	[Homepage]
Place de la Musique	Barrington Hills	McHenry	Northern Illinois	Music	Open for group tours and events, collection of antique music machines including phonographs, player pianos, fairground and band organs, calliopes	
Pleasant Home	Oak Park	Cook	Chicago area	Historic house	Prairie style mansion, local history exhibits by the Historical Society of Oak Park and River Forest	
Polish Museum of America	Chicago	Cook	Chicago area	Ethnic	Polish history, culture and art	
Pontiac Museum Complex	Pontiac	Livingston	Central	Multiple	Includes the Route 66 Association of Illinois Hall of Fame and Museum, Livingston County War Museum, Walldog Mural and Sign Art Museum, Bob Waldmire Experience, Life in the 1940s Exhibit, Music of the Civil War Exhibit	
Pontiac-Oakland Automobile Museum	Pontiac	Livingston	Central	Automobile	Pontiac and Oakland automobiles and brand items	website
Pope County Historical Society Museum	Golconda	Pope	Southern	Local history		Information
Popeye Museum	Chester	Randolph	Southern	Local history	Located in the home town of Popeye	Homepage
Poplar Grove Vintage Wings & Wheels Museum	Poplar Grove	Boone	Northern Illinois	Transportation	Vintage aircraft, automobiles and other modes of transportation and memorabilia	Homepage
Postville Courthouse State Historic Site	Ellis Grove	Logan	Southern	Historic site	Reconstructed frontier courthouse	
Prairie Aviation Museum	Bloomington	McLean	Central	Aviation	Military aircraft	Homepage
Prairie Grass Nature Museum	Round Lake	Lake	Chicago area	Natural history		Homepage
Prairie Land Heritage Museum	Jacksonville	Morgan	Central	Agriculture	Antique farm machinery, steam engines, tools and equipment	Homepage
Prairie Mills Windmill	Golden	Adams	Western	Mill	Restored Dutch smock windmill, includes Golden Museum of local history; operated by the Golden Historical Society	Homepage
Princeville Heritage Museum	Princeville	Peoria	Central	Local history		Homepage
Pritzker Military Museum & Library	Chicago	Cook	Chicago area	Art	Exhibits of military art drawn from its collections	
Prophetstown Historical Society Museum	Prophetstown	Whiteside	Northern Illinois	Local history	Located in the Asa Crook House	
Pullman National Monument	Chicago	Cook	Chicago area	Historic site	Includes Hotel Florence, Administration and Factory Complex, Pullman Railroad Porters National Museum	
Quincy Art Center	Quincy	Adams	Western	Art		Homepage
Quincy Museum	Quincy	Adams	Western	Local history	Includes period rooms, local history exhibits, store display, dinosaur room	
Randolph County Archives and Museum	Chester	Randolph	Southern	Local history		
Ratcliff Inn	Carmi	White	Southern	Local history	Operated by the White County Historical Society	
Raupp Museum	Buffalo Grove	Lake	Chicago area	Local history		
Reddick Mansion	Ottawa	LaSalle	Northern Illinois	Historic house	Pre-Civil War Italianate mansion	Homepage
The Renaissance Society	Chicago	Cook	Chicago area	Art	Exhibits of contemporary art	
Rheinberger Museum	Nauvoo	Hancock	Central	Historic house	Operated by the Nauvoo Historical Society in Nauvoo State Park, mid-19th-century period house	Homepage
Richard W. Bock Sculpture Museum	Greenville	Bond	Southern	Art	Part of Greenville College, houses collection of bronze and plaster sculptures by Richard Bock	Homepage
Ridge Historical Society	Chicago	Cook	Chicago area	Local history	Exhibits related to Chicago neighborhoods of Beverly Hills, Morgan Park and Washington Heights, open by appointment	Homepage
Riverside Historical Museum	Riverside	Cook	Chicago area	Local history	Operated by the Riverside Historical Commission	Homepage
Robert R. McCormick Museum	Wheaton	DuPage	Chicago area	Historic house	1930s historic mansion with biographical exhibits about Robert R. McCormick, publisher of the Chicago Tribune, located at Cantigny	
Robert Vial House	Burr Ridge	Cook	Chicago area	Historic house	Mid-19th-century farmhouse, operated by the Flagg Creek Heritage Society	
Robie House	Chicago	Cook	Chicago area	Historic house	Designed by Frank Lloyd Wright	
Robinson-Stewart House	Carmi	White	Southern	Historic house	Operated by the White County Historical Society, 1814 house with furnishings, many of which date to the 1830s	
Rochelle Fire Department Museum	Rochelle	Ogle	Northern Illinois	Firefighting		
Rochelle Railroad Park	Rochelle	Ogle	Northern Illinois	Railroad	City park where railfans can safely view and photograph trains, includes a 7-ton Whitcomb locomotive, recreated hobo jungle	
Rockford Art Museum	Rockford	Winnebago	Northern Illinois	Art	American art from the 19th century to the present	Homepage
Rockford Auto Museum	Rockford	Winnebago	Northern Illinois	Automobile	Classic American muscle cars	Homepage
Rockford University Art Gallery	Rockford	Winnebago	Northern Illinois	Art	Located in the Clark Arts Center	Homepage
Rock Falls Fire Department Museum	Rock Falls	Whiteside	Northern Illinois	Firefighting		Homepage
Rock Island Arsenal Museum	Rock Island	Rock Island	Quad Cities	Military	History of Rock Island Arsenal, Arsenal Island and small arms development	
Rock Island Railroad Museum	Chillicothe	Peoria	Central	Railroad	Operated by the Chillicothe Historical Society	Homepage
Rock N Roll McDonald's	Chicago	Cook	Chicago area	Food	Restaurant with McDonald's memorabilia and rock and roll artifacts	
Rockton Township Historical Society Museum	Rockton	Winnebago	Northern Illinois	Local history		Homepage
Rolling Meadows Historical Museum	Rolling Meadows	Cook	Chicago area	Local history	1950s period displays	Homepage
Ronald Reagan Birthplace	Tampico	Whiteside	Northern Illinois	Biographical	Early life of President Ronald Reagan	
Ronald Reagan Boyhood Home	Dixon	Lee	Northern Illinois	Historic house	1920s period boyhood home of President Ronald Reagan	
Ronald Reagan Museum at Eureka College	Eureka	Woodford	Central	Biographical		
Roselle History Museum	Roselle	DuPage	Chicago area	Local history	Includes local history museum and 1920s period home	Homepage
Rossville Depot Railroad Museum	Rossville	Vermilion	Central	Railroad	Operated by the Danville Junction Chapter of the National Railway Historical Society	Homepage
Russell Military Museum	Russell	Lake	Chicago area	Military	Tanks, military vehicles, weapons, memorabilia	Homepage
Ryan Round Barn	Kewanee	Henry	Western	Agriculture	Located in Johnson-Sauk Trail State Park	
Savanna Museum and Cultural Center	Savanna	Carroll	Northern Illinois	Local history		Homepage
Savanna Train Car Museum	Savanna	Carroll	Northern Illinois	Railroad		Homepage
Schingoethe Center of Aurora University	Aurora	Kane	Chicago area	Native American	Part of Aurora University, historic and contemporary American Indian culture	Homepage
Schmidt-Burnham Log House	Winnetka	Cook	Chicago area	School	Operated by the Winnetka Historical Society	Homepage
Schuyler County Historical Jail Museum & Genealogical Center	Rushville	Schuyler	Western	Local history		Homepage
Science Center of Southern Illinois	Carbondale	Jackson	Southern	Science	Hands-on science activities	Homepage
Shabbona-Lee-Rollo Historical Museum	Shabbona	DeKalb	Northern Illinois	Local history		Homepage
Shedd Aquarium	Chicago	Cook	Chicago area	Aquarium		
Sheffield Museum	Sheffield	Bureau	Northern Illinois	Local history	Operated by the Sheffield Historical Society	Homepage
Sheldon Peck Homestead	Lombard	DuPage	Chicago area	Historic house	1840s-1860s period home, operated by the Lombard Historical Society	
Shiloh House	Zion	Lake	Chicago area	Historic house	Operated by the Zion Historical Society, early 20th-century mansion of town founder John Alexander Dowie	Homepage
Silkwood Inn	Mulkeytown	Franklin	Southern	Historic house	Waypoint along the historical Shawneetown–Kaskaskia Trail, and home of Priscilla Silkwood	
Silvercreek Museum	Freeport	Stephenson	Northern Illinois	History	Early Americana including crockery, dolls, recreated schoolroom and kitchen, art exhibits, quilts, old-fashioned tools and agricultural equipment, engines, vehicles, trains	Homepage
Skokie Heritage Museum	Skokie	Cook	Chicago area	Historic house	Historic engine house with fire equipment and original 1847 log cabin	Homepage
Slovenian Heritage Museum	Joliet	Will	Chicago area	Ethnic	Operated by the Slovenian Women's Union of America	Homepage
Smart Museum of Art	Chicago	Cook	Chicago area	Art	Part of the University of Chicago	
Sousa Archives and Center for American Music	Urbana	Champaign	Champaign-Urbana Metropolitan Area	Music	Exhibits about American music from its collections	
Southern Illinois Art & Artisans Center	Whittington	Franklin	Southern	Art	Satellite gallery of the Illinois State Museum	
Southern Illinois University Carbondale University Museum	Carbondale	Jackson	Southern	Art, Science & Humanities	Located in Faner Hall (SIUC)	Homepage
Southern Illinois University Edwardsville ADW Gallery	Edwardsville	Madison	Metro-East	Art	Located in the Art & Design West building	Homepage
Spertus Institute for Jewish Learning and Leadership	Chicago	Cook	Chicago area	Religious	Exhibits on Jewish culture and history	
Spring Valley Historic Association Museum	Spring Valley	Bureau	Northern Illinois	Local history		Homepage
Spurlock Museum	Urbana	Champaign	Champaign–Urbana metropolitan area	Anthropology	Part of University of Illinois at Urbana–Champaign. Houses exhibits on the ancient Mediterranean, Africa, Asia, Oceania, Europe, and the Americas	
Stacy's Tavern Museum	Glen Ellyn	DuPage	Chicago area	Historic site	Operated by the Glen Ellyn Historical Society, 1840s wayside stagecoach inn	
Star Worlds Arcade	DeKalb	DeKalb	Northern Illinois	Arcade	Exhibition of video gaming collectibles and 1980s pop culture	
Starved Rock State Park	Utica	LaSalle	Northern Illinois	Multiple	Visitor center exhibits about the park's natural and cultural history	
St. Charles History Museum	St. Charles	Kane	Northern Illinois	Local history		Homepage
Stephenson County Historical Society Museum	Freeport	Stephenson	Northern Illinois	Multiple	Includes the Oscar Taylor House, one-room schoolhouse, Industrial/Arcade Toy Museum, Irish Homestead Log Cabin, arboretum	Homepage
Stewart House Museum	Monmouth	Warren	Central	Historic house	Birthplace of Kappa Kappa Gamma sorority, Victorian period house	
Stockdale Soldier Citizen Museum	Galesburg	Knox	Western	Military	Located in the Admiral James Stockdale VFW Building	
Stockton Heritage Museum	Stockton	Jo Daviess	Northern Illinois	Local history		
Stone Mill Museum	Sandwich	DeKalb	Northern Illinois	Local history	Operated by the Sandwich Historical Society	
Streatorland Museum	Streator	Livingston	Northern Illinois	Local history	Operated by the Streatorland Historical Society	Homepage
Super Museum	Metropolis	Massac	Southern	Media	Superman memorabilia	Homepage
Swedish American Museum	Chicago	Cook	Chicago area	Cultural		
Sycamore History Museum	Sycamore	DeKalb	Northern Illinois	Local history		Homepage
Tampico Area Historical Museum	Tampico	Whiteside	Northern Illinois	Local history		Homepage
Tarble Arts Center	Charleston	Cole	Central	Art	Part of Eastern Illinois University	Homepage
Teutopolis Monastery Museum	Teutopolis	Effingham	Central	Religious	History of the Franscicans and other area pioneers	
Thomson Depot Museum	Thomson	Carroll	Northern Illinois	Railroad	Railroad artifacts and pioneer items	Homepage
Thornton Historical Museum	Thornton	Cook	Chicago area	Local history	Operated by the Village of Thornton Historical Society in a former Lutheran church	
Tinker Swiss Cottage Museum	Rockford	Winnebago	Northern Illinois	Historic house	Victorian Swiss-style home with decorative arts and furnishings	
Tiskilwa Historical Society Museum	Tiskilwa	Bureau	Northern Illinois	Local history	Native American artifacts, village, military and school memorabilia, Hennepin Canal construction photos, farm implements, domestic items, railroads, churches, toys	Homepage
Trailside Museum of Natural History	River Forest	Cook	Chicago area	Natural history	Operated by the Forest Preserve District of Cook County, live animals, focuses on area wildlife and plants	Homepage
Trapshooting Hall of Fame and Museum	Sparta	Randolph	Southern	Sports	Located in the Illinois Department of Natural Resources World Shooting & Recreational Complex	website
Tremont Museum	Tremont	Tazewell	Central	Local history	Operated by the Tremont Museum and Historical Society	Homepage
Trutter Museum	Springfield	Sangamon	Central	Culture	Part of Lincoln Land Community College, features art, world and cultural items	Homepage
Ukrainian Institute of Modern Art	Chicago	Cook	Chicago area	Art	Contemporary art as a shared expression of the Ukrainian and American experience	
Ukrainian National Museum	Chicago	Cook	Chicago area	Cultural	Ukrainian artifacts, artwork, musical instruments and embroidered folk costumes	
Ulysses S. Grant Home	Galena	Jo Daviess	Northern Illinois	Historic house	Home and museum about President Ulysses S. Grant	
Union County Museum	Cobden	Union	Southern	Local history	Operated by the Union County Historical & Genealogy Society	Homepage
Union Depot Railroad Museum	Mendota	LaSalle	Northern Illinois	Railroad	Operated by the Mendota Museum & Historical Society, includes rolling stock, HO scale model of Mendota in the 1940s	
Unity Temple	Oak Park	Cook	Chicago area	Historic site	Church designed by Frank Lloyd Wright	
University of Illinois Springfield Visual Arts Gallery	Springfield	Sangamon	Central	Art	Located in the Health and Sciences Building	Homepage
University of St. Francis Gallery	Joliet	Will	Chicago area	Art		Homepage
University Museum, SIU	Carbondale	Jackson	Southern	Multiple	Part of Southern Illinois University Carbondale. Local and world connections behind the arts, humanities, and sciences	Homepage
Vachel Lindsay House	Springfield	Sangamon	Central	Historic house	Birthplace and home of poet Vachel Lindsay	
Vandalia State House State Historic Site	Vandalia	Fayette	Southern	Historic site	Restored to 1830s period	
Vermilion County Museum	Danville	Vermilion	Central	Local history	Includes museum and Fithian Home	
Vermilion County War Museum	Danville	Vermilion	Central	Military	Memorabilia and artifacts from the American Revolutionary War to the Iraq War	Homepage
Veterans Educational Museum	Vandalia	Fayette	Southern	Military	Military artifacts from World War I through Desert Storm	Homepage
Victorian Cottage Museum	Lombard	DuPage	Chicago area	Historic house	Victorian period rooms, operated by the Lombard Historical Society	Homepage
Villa Kathrine	Quincy	Adams	Western	Historic house	1900 Moroccan-style home and visitor information center	
Villa Park Historical Society Museum	Villa Park	DuPage	Chicago area	Local history	Housed in a former depot	
Volkening Heritage Farm	Schaumburg	Cook	Chicago area	Farm	1880s living farm museum	Homepage
Volo Auto Museum	Volo	Lake	Chicago area	Automotive	Cars from the 1950s, 1960s, and 1970s as well as from famous television shows and movies	
Wabash County Museum	Mt. Carmel	Wabash	Southern	Local history		Homepage
Wadsworth Family Gallery at Lewis University	Romeoville	Will	Chicago area	Art	Visual art created by national, regional, and local artists and University artists	Homepage
Wagner Farm	Glenview	Cook	Chicago area	Agriculture	Historic working dairy farm, Wagner Farm Heritage Center with farming exhibits, 1930s grocery store	Homepage
Warren County History Museum	Monmouth	Warren	Northern Illinois	Local history	Operated by the Warren County Historical Society	Homepage
Warrenville Historical Museum	Warrenville	DuPage	Chicago area	Local history	Operated by the Warrenville Historical Society	Homepage
Waterman Area Heritage Society Museum	Waterman	DeKalb	Northern Illinois	Local history		Homepage
Waukegan History Museum	Waukegan	Lake	Chicago area	Local history	Operated by the Waukegan Historical Society in the late 19th-century period Haines House	Homepage
Weber House and Garden	Streator	LaSalle	Northern Illinois	Historic house	18th-century-style storybook house of Ted Weber	Homepage
Weld House Museum	Nauvoo	Hancock	Central	Local history	Operated by the Nauvoo Historical Society, mid-19th-century period house	Homepage
West Chicago City Museum	West Chicago	DuPage	Chicago area	Local history	Local history and art	
West Franklin Historical Museum	Mulkeytown	Franklin	Southern	Local history	Civic history of townships and communities in Western Franklin County	
West Town Museum of Cultural History	Maywood	Cook	Chicago area	Local history	Includes exhibits of African-American culture, Maywood and the Proviso Township area	Homepage
Westclox Museum	Peru	LaSalle	Northern Illinois	Industry	History of the Westclox company, its clocks and employees	Homepage
Western Illinois Museum	Macomb	McDonough	Western	Local history		Homepage
Wheaton College Walford Art Galleries	Wheaton	DuPage	Chicago area	Art	Three gallery spaces in Adams Hall	Homepage
Wheeling Historical Society Museum	Wheeling	Cook	Chicago area	Local history		Homepage
Wheels O' Time Museum	Peoria	Peoria	Central	Transportation	Antique vehicles, farm equipment, tools, collectibles	Homepage
Wiley House Museum	Galva	Henry	Northern Illinois	Historic house	Operated by the Galva Historical Society	Homepage
Will County Historical Society Museum	Lockport	Will	Chicago area	Open air	Includes local history and canal museum, one-room schoolhouse, depot, 1873 farmhouse, village jail, 1830s log cabin, blacksmith's shop, and tinsmith's shop	
William and Florence Schmidt Art Center	Belleville	St. Clair	Metro-East	Art	Part of Southwestern Illinois College, includes paintings, photography and pre-Columbian artifacts	
William Jennings Bryan Boyhood Home	Salem	Marion	Southern	Historic house	Mid-19th-century house, open by appointment	
William L. Gregg House Museum	Westmont	DuPage	Chicago area	Historic house	Operated by the Westmont Historical Society	
Williamson County Museum	Marion	Williamson	Southern	Local history	Features Victorian period rooms in the former jail and sheriff's house, operated by the Williamson County Illinois Historical Society	
William Tanner House Museum	Aurora	Kane	Chicago area	Historic house	Antebellum Italianate-style house, owned and operated by the Aurora Historical Society	
Williamsville Historical Museum	Williamsville	Sangamon	Central	Local history	Constructed from two railroad boxcars	
Wilmette Historical Museum	Wilmette	Cook	Chicago area	Local history	Operated by the Wilmette Historical Society	Homepage
Winnetka Historical Society Museum	Winnetka	Cook	Chicago area	Local history		Homepage
Winslow Historical Society Museum	Winslow	Stephenson	Chicago area	Local history		
WIU Art Gallery	Macomb	McDonough	Western	Art	Part of Western Illinois University	Homepage
WIU Geology Museum	Macomb	McDonough	Western	Natural history	Part of Western Illinois University, first floor of Tillman Hall	Homepage
Wonder Works	Oak Park	Cook	Chicago area	Children's		
Woodlawn Farm	Jacksonville	Morgan	Central	Historic house	1840s house, part of the Underground Railroad	
World Aerospace Museum	Quincy	Adams	Western	Aviation	Aircraft from former Soviet countries, open by appointment	Homepage
Worth Historical Museum	Worth	Cook	Chicago area	Local history	Operated by the Worth Park District	Homepage
Wyanet Historical Society Museum	Wyanet	Bureau	Northern Illinois	Local history		
Wyatt Earp Birthplace	Monmouth	Warren	Central	Historic house	Birthplace of lawman Wyatt Earp	
Yesterday's Farm Museum	Wood Dale	DuPage	Chicago area	Farm	Operated by the Wood Dale Historical Society, 1850s farm	

== Defunct museums ==
- ABA Museum of Law, Chicago, closed in 2011
- African-American Heritage Museum and Black Veterans Archives, Aurora, former sculpture park dedicated to the leaders of Black American history, closed in 2000. Relocated to Hammonds, LA.
- American Police Center & Museum, Chicago
- Americana Hollywood Museum, Metropolis
- ArtWorks Children's Museum, Ingleside
- Barb City Motorcycle Museum, DeKalb, collection sold in 2013
- Berwyn Route 66 Museum
- Chester Gould-Dick Tracy Museum, Woodstock, closed in 2008, collection now online
- Driehaus Gallery of Stained Glass, gallery of stained glass at Navy Pier closed in 2017
- Gardner Museum of Architecture & Design, Quincy
- Illinois Museum of Natural History, campus of Illinois State University, Old Main building, from 1857 to 1877
- Klairmont Kollections Automotive Museum, Chicago, closed in 2025
- Korean War National Museum, Sangamon, closed in 2017, collections transferred to the Harry S. Truman Presidential Library and Museum
- Lakeview Museum of Arts & Sciences, Peoria, closed in 2012, collections now at the Peoria Riverfront Museum
- Max Nordeen's Wheels Museum, Woodhull
- McCormick Tribune Freedom Museum, Chicago, closed in 2009
- Motorola Museum of Electronics, Schaumburg
- Museum of Funeral Customs, Springfield, closed in 2009
- Museum of Holography, Chicago
- National Museum of Surveying, Springfield, closed in 2013
- Octave Chanute Aerospace Museum, Rantoul, closed in 2015
- Old Barn Museum, Newark
- Oliver Parks Telephone Museum, Springfield
- Park Ridge Historical Society Museum, Park Ridge
- The Peace Museum, Chicago
- Raggedy Ann & Andy Museum, Arcola, Raggedy Ann and Raggedy Andy memorabilia, Johnny Gruelle exhibits closed in 2009
- SciTech Hands On Museum, Aurora
- Shea's Gas Station Museum, Springfield, contents auctioned off in 2015
- Smith Museum of Stained Glass Windows, Chicago, closed in 2014
- Stuka Military Museum, Oregon
- Terra Museum, Chicago, closed on October 31, 2004
- Under the Prairie Frontier Archaeological Museum, Athens, operated by the Sangamo Archaeological Center, closed August 1, 2008
- U.S. Senator Paul Simon Museum, Troy, closed in 2012
- Vinegar Hill Historic Lead Mine & Museum, Galena
- Walter Payton Museum, Aurora, part of a restaurant complex that closed in 2010

== See also ==
- List of museums and cultural institutions in Chicago
- List of nature centers in Illinois
- List of historical societies in Illinois
