= Raupp Museum =

Local history museum in Buffalo Grove, Illinois

- Established: 1979
- Location: 901 Dunham Lane; Buffalo Grove, Illinois
- Coordinates: 42.1698°N 87.9781°W
- Type: Local history
- Website: www.bgparks.org/facilities/raupp-museum/

The Raupp Memorial Museum is a museum that chronicles the social history of Buffalo Grove, Illinois. It is run by the Buffalo Grove Park District and an award-winning member of the Illinois Association of Museums.

== History ==
The village of Buffalo Grove began as a German dairy farming community in the 1840s. The families of Melchoir Raupp and Jacob Weidner were among the first to settle the area. The community grew steadily and was incorporated as a village in 1958. As it became more suburban, farms were sold off to developers. While selling off their land in 1964, Philip, Carl and John Raupp (three bachelor brothers and descendants of Melchoir Raupp) also donated three acres and their farmhouse to the Village of Buffalo Grove. The land was later transferred to the Buffalo Grove Park District on the condition that the land would be used for either a museum or library.

The Park District moved forward with plans to turn the area into a museum dedicated to the history of Buffalo Grove and renovations commenced on the farmhouse. The project was moving along until 1972, when the farmhouse caught fire and burned to the ground. The Levitt Company, a local subdivision developer, having completed building all three of its subdivisions, agreed to donate its sales office to serve as the new museum building. In 1975, the building was moved and rolled down Arlington Heights Road to its current location on Dunham Lane

This Illinois museum officially opened to the community and dedicated on September 16, 1979. The building has undergone several major renovations since its dedication. Construction in 2002 added a large main gallery wing, a lower level gallery, and collection storage area. In 2013, the museum received a state grant to overhaul the old Town Square in the original Levitt building and make it ADA compliant. The gallery was completely gutted and replaced as The Crossroads, which opened in April 2014.

== Exhibits ==
The museum offers a variety of educational programs for scouts and schools that correspond with rotating exhibits and meet state Common Core Standards. The museum's collection contains over 3000 local history artifacts that are displayed and stored on-site in the three interactive gallery spaces.

The main gallery depicts the chronological social history of Buffalo Grove starting in the 1830s. This follows the stories of early people that settled in the area including the Potawatomi and farm families. Then it explores the growth of the area as an incorporated village suburb through the 1950s and 1960s.

The second gallery used to feature walk-in environments from Town Square businesses in the 1880s including: the Gerschefske Barber Shop, a pharmacy, Weidner Store, a saloon and Tripp School. This had been on exhibit since the museum's dedication. It was replaced in 2014 after a year-long renovation, and now features environments to tell new stories from the early 20th century, including a greenhouse representing nurseries in the area like Geimer and Fiore, the Prairie View train station, the Welter gas station, and Weidner General Store.

The third gallery holds temporary exhibits that rotate several times a year. Past exhibits have included local painters' showcases, kites, the American Civil War, and women's suffrage. This space is also used for programming and special events.
