= Lemont Methodist Episcopal Church =

Historic church in Illinois, United States

- U.S. National Register of Historic Places
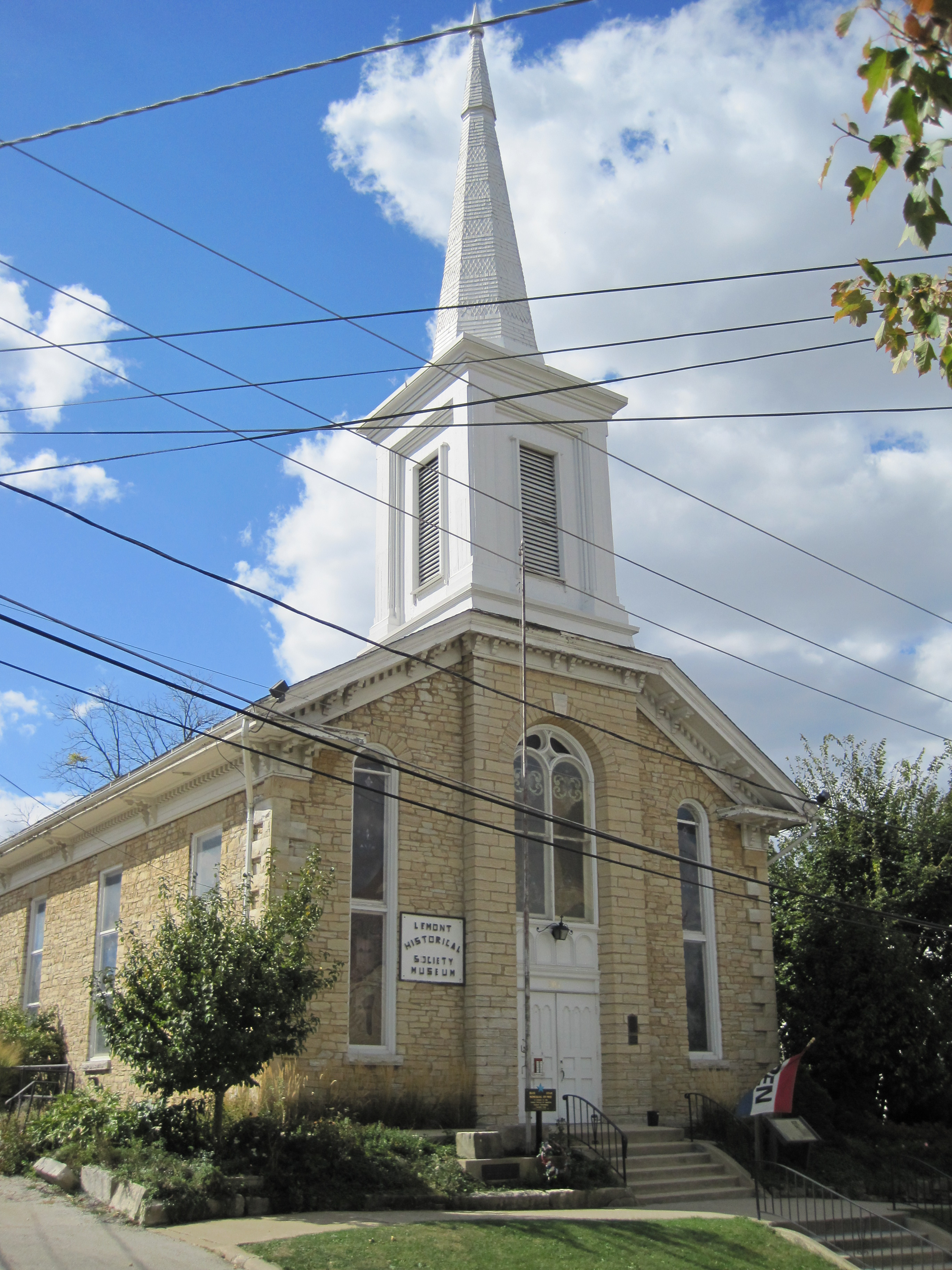

- Location within Illinois Location within the United States
- Location: 306 Lemont St., Lemont, Illinois
- Coordinates: 41°40′23″N 88°0′0″W
- Area: 0.2 acres (0.081 ha)
- Built: 1861
- Architectural style: Italianate
- NRHP reference No.: 86001031
- Added to NRHP: May 5, 1986

Lemont Methodist Episcopal Church, also known as the Old Stone Church, is a historic church building at 306 Lemont Street in Lemont, Illinois.

It was built in 1861 and added to the National Register in 1986.

== Lemont Area Historical Society and Museum ==
The building is now home to the Lemont Area Historical Society and Museum, which was founded in 1970 to save the building. The museum features displays of local history and culture. The Society hosts historic programs, tours and lectures.
