= Müller House =

Historic house in Illinois, United States

- U.S. National Register of Historic Places
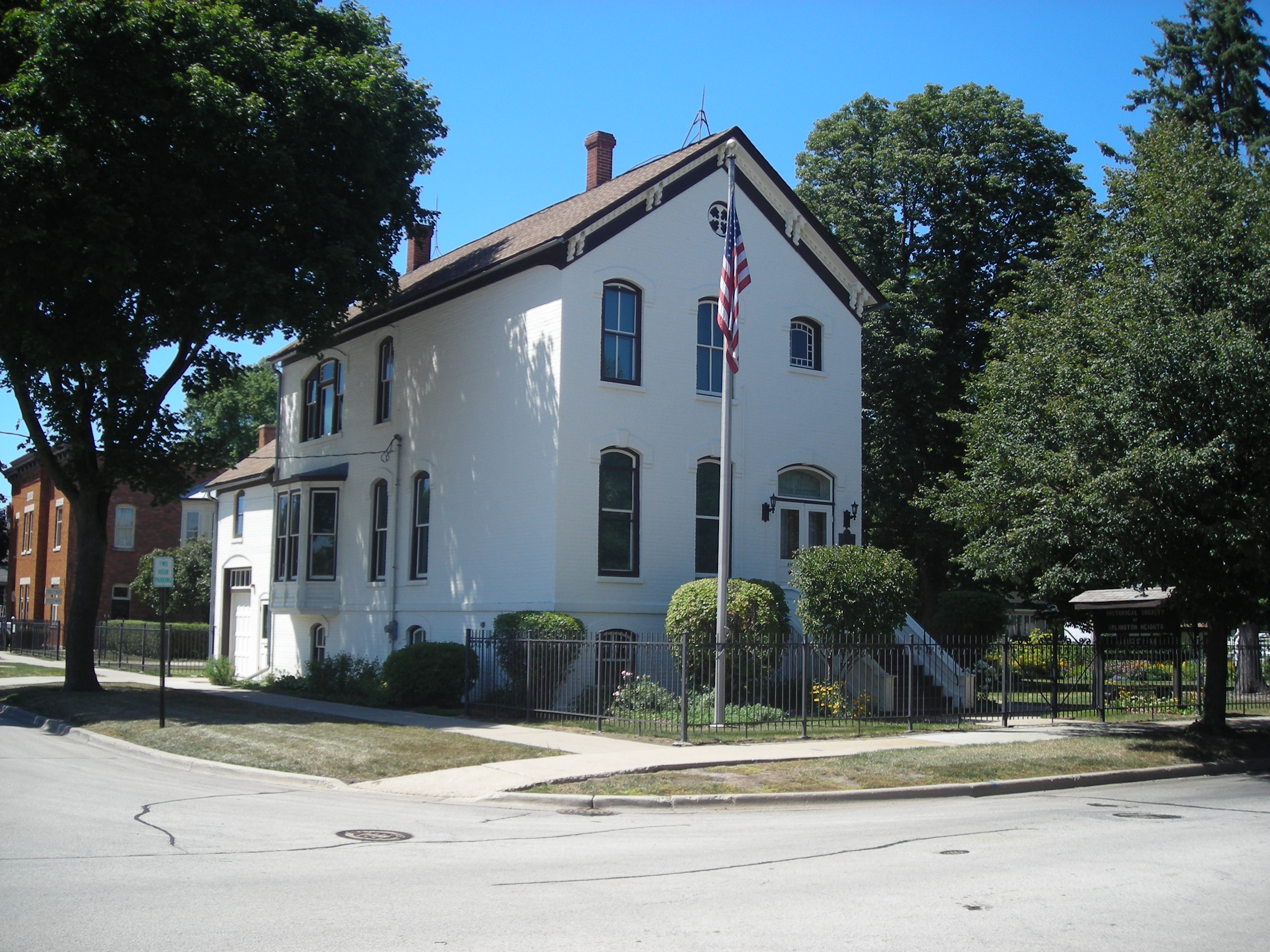

- Location within Illinois
- Location: Arlington Heights, Cook County, Illinois, United States
- Coordinates: 42°5′14.60″N 87°59′2.80″W
- Area: less than one acre
- NRHP reference No.: 79000819
- Added to NRHP: March 26, 1979

The Müller House is a historic house located at 500 North Vail Avenue in Arlington Heights, Illinois. F.W. Müller built the house for his family and their soda water business in 1882. The Müller business was one of the first commercial establishments in Arlington Heights and was part of the city's early transition from a rural settlement to a large suburb of Chicago. The house is also an uncommon blend of architectural styles; while it features a Greek Revival cornice with scrolled brackets and a symmetrical front facade, the style is not seen elsewhere in the house, which otherwise has a Victorian design. The design also combines the functional necessities of the factory with the decorative features of a middle-class home; prominent among the latter is the house's woodwork, which includes a carved oak staircase.

The house was added to the National Register of Historic Places on March 26, 1979. It is now part of the Arlington Heights Historical Museum.
