= William Beith House =

Historic house in Illinois, United States

- U.S. National Register of Historic Places
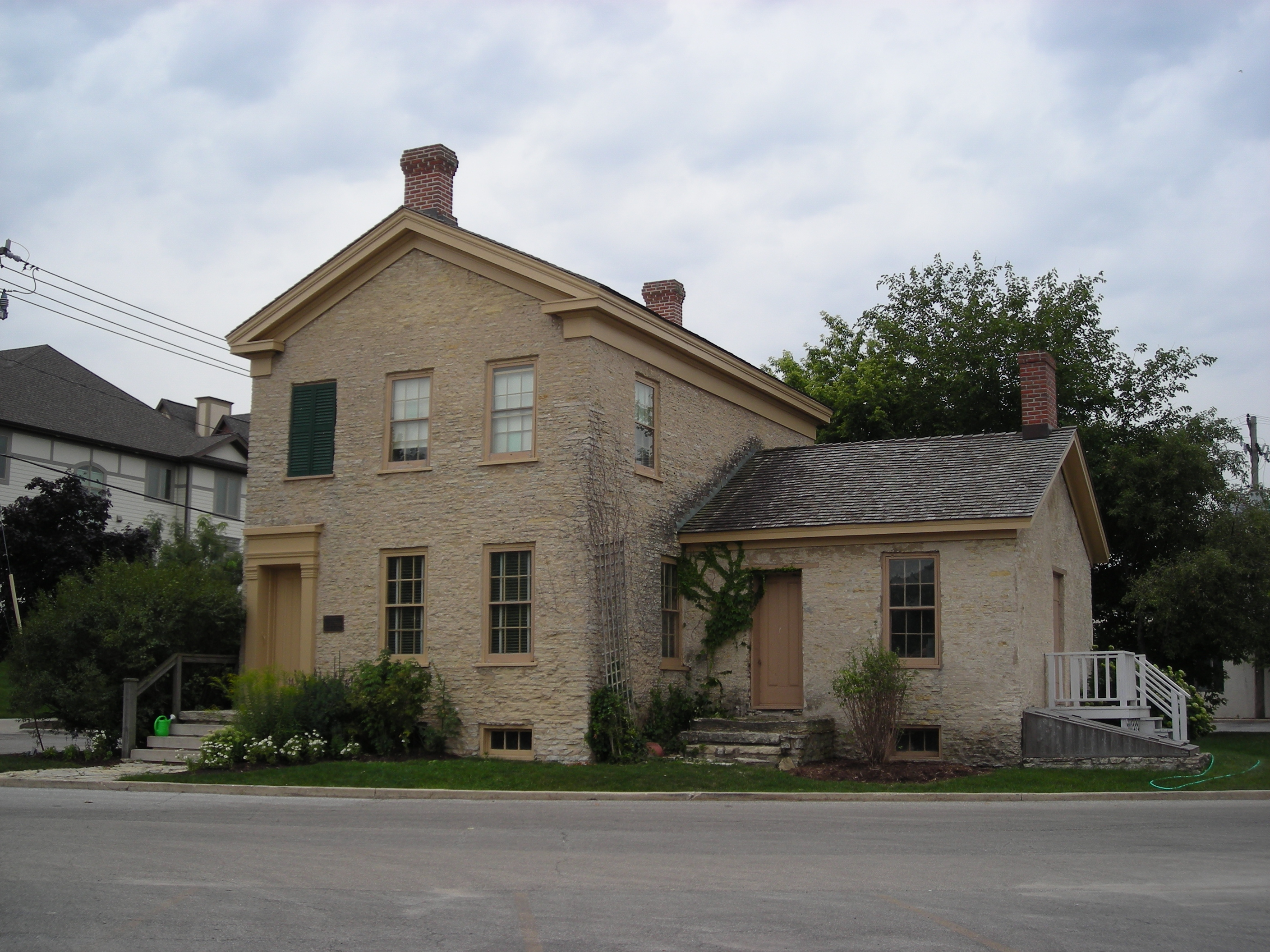
- Location: St Charles, Kane County, Illinois, United States
- Coordinates: 41°54′39.76″N 88°18′46.15″W
- Built: 1850
- Architect: William Beith
- Architectural style: Greek Revival
- NRHP reference No.: 83003575
- Added to NRHP: December 7, 1983

The William Beith House, now known as the Beith House Museum, is a Registered Historic Place located at 8 Indiana Street in St. Charles, Il. It largely retains its original riverstone exterior, while many other local structures have been significantly altered or covered in stucco.

== History ==
William Beith immigrated from Scotland in 1843. Beith became a prominent local builder in Kane County, Illinois, who built this house from 1845 to 1850 for his family. The William Beith House is notable as one of the only riverstone houses of the 1850s remaining in St. Charles.

The Preservation Partners of the Fox Valley rescued the house in 1980 and restored it to operate as a museum of house preservation. Exhibits show mid-19th century decorative arts, and the techniques used to restore the interior features and exterior structure. The United States Department of the Interior recognized the house as a Historic Place on December 7, 1983. The home serves as the headquarters for Preservation Partners.

== Architecture ==
The house is a simple two-story Greek Revival design. The main door is on the east side, facing the Fox River. It is on the left side of the exterior, and is surrounded by windows to the right and above. The southern exposure has two windows on each floor, and the north side has one window on each floor. The west side also has two windows per floor. Two additional windows also originally adorned the main structure, but since have been filled in with brick. A small, one-story attachment was added at the time of original construction and also has an east-facing entrance.

The entrance hall (on the southeast) contains the main staircase with walnut railings, spindles, and newel post. The parlor room is to the right, a bedroom to the rear, and two other bedrooms to the west. The kitchen is in the one-story attachment. The second story entry hall links to three bedrooms (the center bedroom now functions as a bathroom). A basement holds a large brick cistern and a bricked-in opening. It is thought that this may have been a tunnel from the river to serve on the Underground Railroad; Beith was a noted local abolitionist.
