= Ratcliff Inn =

- U.S. National Register of Historic Places
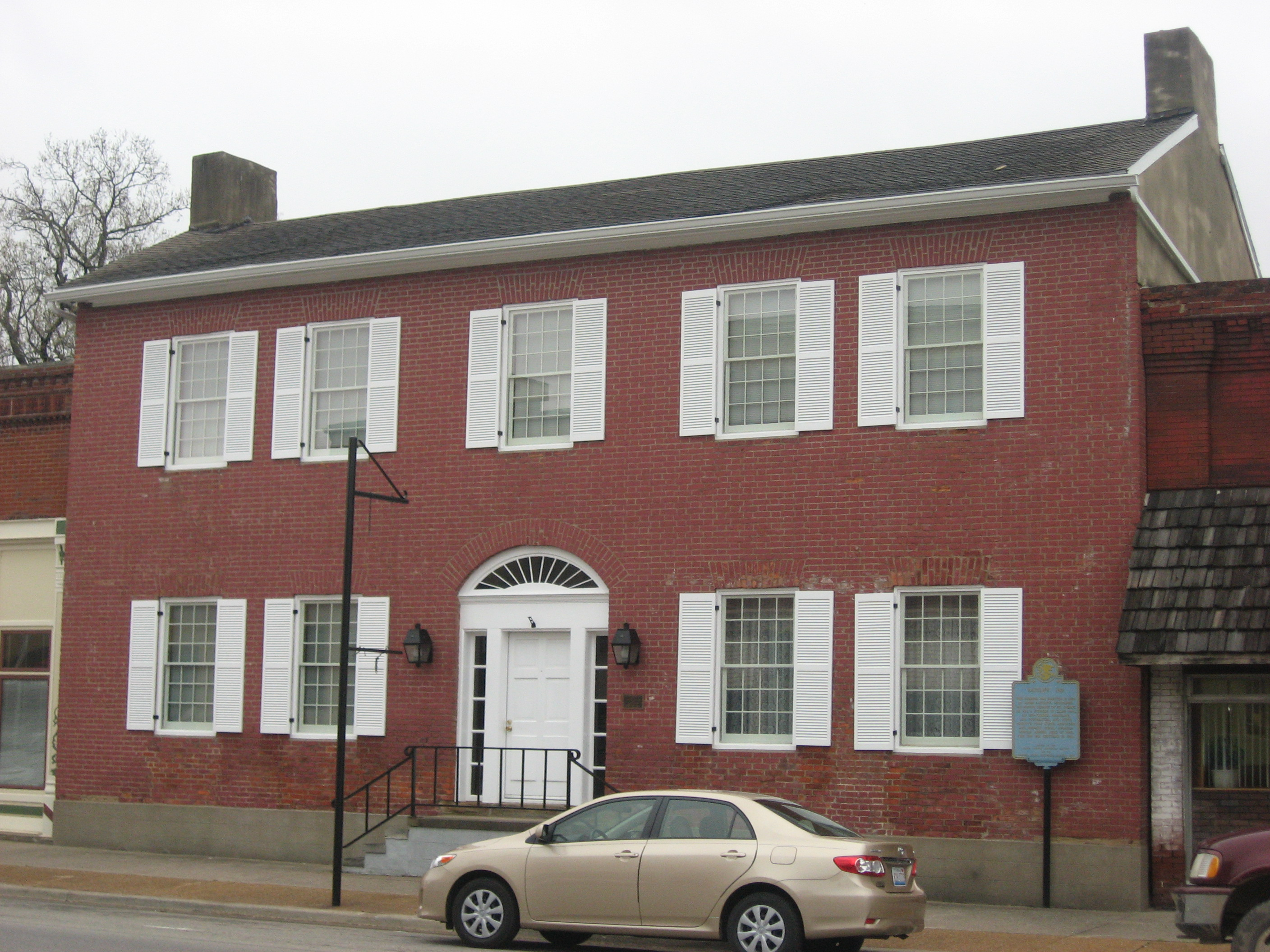
- The inn in 2013

- Location within Illinois Location within the United States
- Location: 214 E. Main St., Carmi, Illinois
- Coordinates: 38°5′25″N 88°9′33″W
- Area: 0.5 acres (0.20 ha)
- Built: 1828
- Architectural style: Federal
- NRHP reference No.: 73000719
- Added to NRHP: June 4, 1973

The Ratcliff Inn is a historic inn and stagecoach stop located at 214 E. Main St. in Carmi, Illinois. The Federal style building was built in 1828 for innkeeper James Ratcliff. Ratcliff was one of Carmi's and White County's founders and the city's first postmaster; he also served as the first county clerk and probate judge. Abraham Lincoln slept at the inn in 1840 while attending a Carmi political rally in support of William Henry Harrison. The White County Historical Society restored the inn in 1960 to save it from demolition.

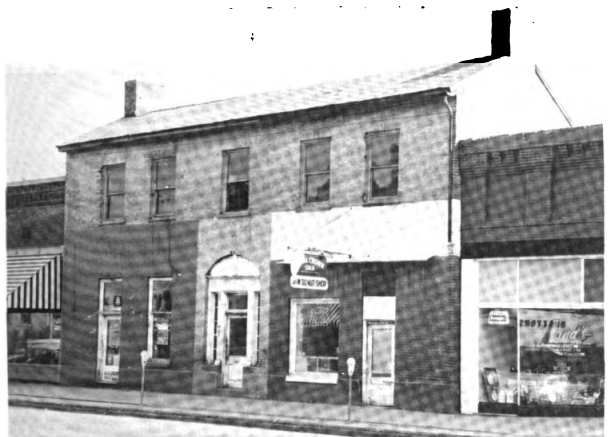
The inn prior to its restoration, 1960.

The building was added to the National Register of Historic Places on June 4, 1973.
