= Little Brick House =

Historic house in Illinois, United States

- U.S. National Register of Historic Places
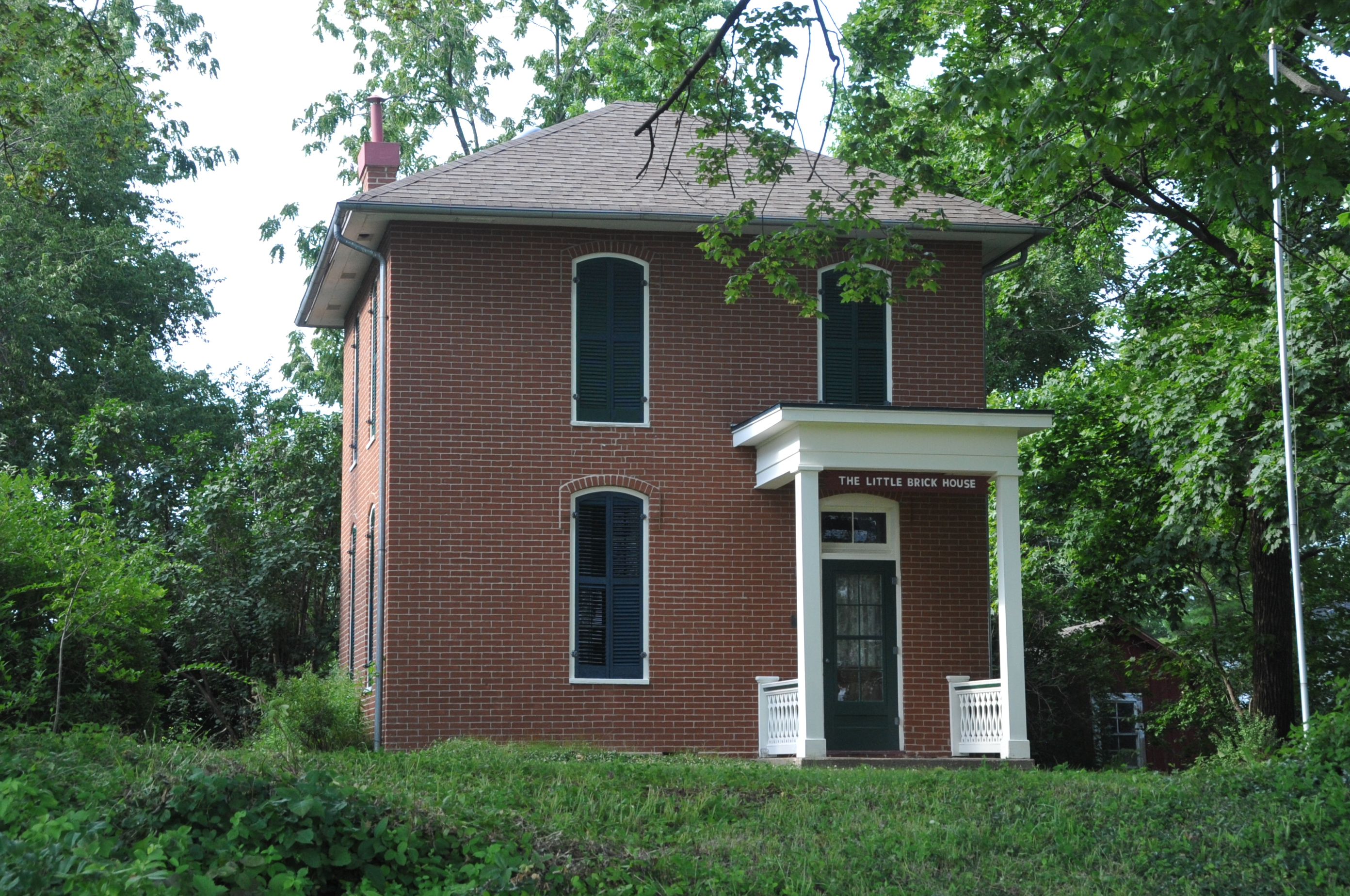

- Location within Illinois Location within the United States
- Interactive map showing the location of Little Brick House
- Location: 621 St. Clair St., Vandalia, Illinois
- Coordinates: 38°58′5″N 89°6′7″W
- Area: 0.5 acres (0.20 ha)
- Built: c. 1839
- Architectural style: Italianate
- NRHP reference No.: 73000701
- Added to NRHP: June 4, 1973

Little Brick House is a restored 1860s middle-class home in Vandalia, Illinois, located in Fayette County. The home is the only house in Vandalia to be listed on the National Register of Historic Places. It has been listed as such since 1973.

== History ==
The home is thought to have been constructed in the mid-19th century as an example of Italianate architecture, probably around 1839, before the capitol moved from Vandalia to Springfield. In 1956 Josephine Burtschi purchased the home and began restoring it to its original appearance. Burtschi, a local artist and historian was born in the home. Within the home's six rooms are furniture, china, engravings and books acquired from descendants of state officers, legislators and the Ferdinand Ernst Colony. The library in the home, called the Berry-Hall Room is a tribute to James William Berry, a talented Illinois artist and Judge James Hall who established Vandalia as "the first literary center west of Cincinnati." Through the years the home has been renovated and furnished with period furnishings and early artifacts of Vandalia. Today the home is open to the public.
