= Will County Historical Society Headquarters =

- U.S. National Register of Historic Places
- U.S. Historic district – Contributing property
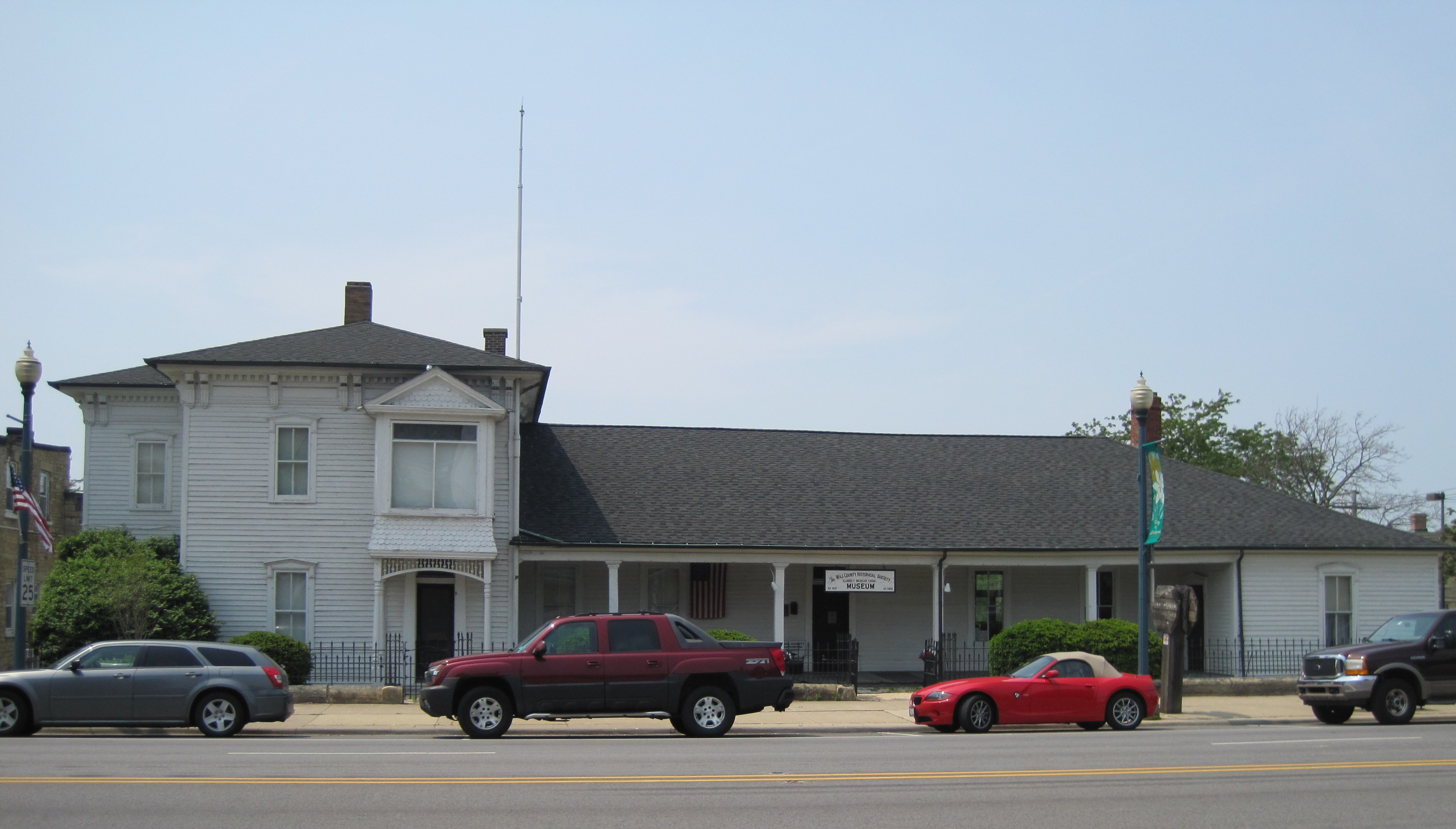

- Location within Illinois Location within the United States
- Interactive map showing the location of Will County Historical Society Headquarters
- Location: 803 S. State St., Lockport, Illinois
- Coordinates: 41°35′21″N 88°3′17″W
- Area: 0.1 acres (0.040 ha)
- Built: 1845
- Architectural style: Greek Revival, Late Victorian
- Part of: Lockport Historic District (ID75000676)
- NRHP reference No.: 72000467
- Added to NRHP: May 17, 1972

The Will County Historical Society Headquarters is a historic building in Lockport, Illinois, United States, originally known as the Illinois and Michigan Canal Office Building. It served as the headquarters of the Canal Commission of the Illinois and Michigan Canal from 1836 until 1871, when control of the canal was transferred to the state.

== History ==
The Illinois and Michigan Canal was a canal that connected Lake Michigan to the Mississippi River via the Illinois and Chicago Rivers. It was first conceived in 1824, when a survey of five potential routes was assessed. Three years later, the United States Congress approved the project. In 1829, the Canal Commission was formed to raise money and oversee the project. The project was dormant until ground was broken on July 4, 1836. That year, the Canal Commission laid out the town of Lockport, Illinois with the intention of locating the canal headquarters there. Slowed by the Panic of 1837, the canal was finally completed in 1848. The headquarters building was built in 1845. The first ship on the canal was launched in Lockport. The Canal Commission operated the canal from this building until 1871, when canal operation was turned over to the state.

The building was later purchased by the Will County Historical Society as a headquarters and museum. On May 17, 1972, the building was recognized by the National Park Service with a listing on the National Register of Historic Places. When the Lockport Historic District was created three years later, the building was listed as a contributing property.

== Architecture ==
The former canal office building is generally Greek Revival in style, with a symmetrical facade, low hipped roof, rectangular transom, and recessed porch. The original building was one story and today corresponds to the northern portion. A two-story residence was added to the south end of the structure in the 1860s or 1870s. The residence reflects a more Victorian style with deeply molded eaves, heavy brackets, turned porch, and low-pitched roof. However, the two portions of the building share similar window patterns.
