= Easley Pioneer Museum =

Coordinates: 40.35302°N 90.32729°W

- Established: 2003
- Location: 210 W. Broadway, Ipava, Illinois

Easley Pioneer Museum is located at the corner of Mills Street and West Broadway in Ipava, Illinois. The museum is privately owned by a descendant of the original Easley family. The Easley family founded the town of Ipava, Illinois and many descendants of the original family still live in the area. The museum houses a large collection of Easley family genealogical information as well as a very large collection of artifacts related to the World War II Army camp, Camp Ellis.

One building of the museum complex is the restored former Freeman School #179 - a one-room schoolhouse in Fulton County, Illinois. The museum houses what is believed to be the original log cabin school of John Easley, the father of Ipava. The largest collection of the museum relates to the World War II Army camp, Camp Ellis, which was located nearby.

By November 1949, Camp Ellis proper, minus designated areas the Illinois National Guard retained was declared excess and was approved for disposal on 1 December 1949.
