= Society of Gilders =

Non-profit organization for the art of using gold

The Society of Gilders (SoG) is an international non-profit organization dedicated to the practice and preservation of the art of using gold and metal leaf. SoG offers technical help for gilders, restorers, conservators, craftsmen, and all those interested in the gilding arts. Classes and conferences held by SoG bring gilders together from around the globe to learn, discuss and share.

Membership is open to any interested individual, institution or corporation.

== Mission ==
The Society of Gilders is a non-profit educational organization devoted to the art and craft of gilding. The society's mission is to preserve traditional gilding skills and techniques, and to promote the highest standards in the practice of gilding.

== History ==
A landmark event in the world of gilding took place at the Newark Museum in New Jersey during the winter of 1986. While attending a week-long gilding course hosted by the museum's Arts Workshop, gilders met and exchanged gilding recipes, anecdotes, techniques and ethical concerns. The participants expressed a unanimous desire to extend this collaboration into an organization patterned after the ancient craftsmen's guilds. Originally called the Guild of Gilders, the group changed their name to the Society of Gilders, welcoming fellow gilders and anyone interested in the art of gilding to join their ranks.

Today the Society of Gilders continues to grow, and the Regional Education Program continues to teach the art of gilding in many disciplines. Conferences have been held in Charleston, South Carolina (2000), Washington DC (2001, 2003, 2006 and 2008), and New Orleans, Louisiana (2007 to 2013).

== Museum of Gilding Arts ==
The Society opened the Museum of Gilding Arts in Pontiac, Illinois in 2015. Displays include the history of gold beating, its use as a decorative element and a display of works of art by the Society's members. There is also a recreation of the M. Swift & Sons factory, a gold leaf manufacturing company founded in Hartford, Connecticut in 1887.
