= Heritage House Museum =

Historic house in Illinois, United States

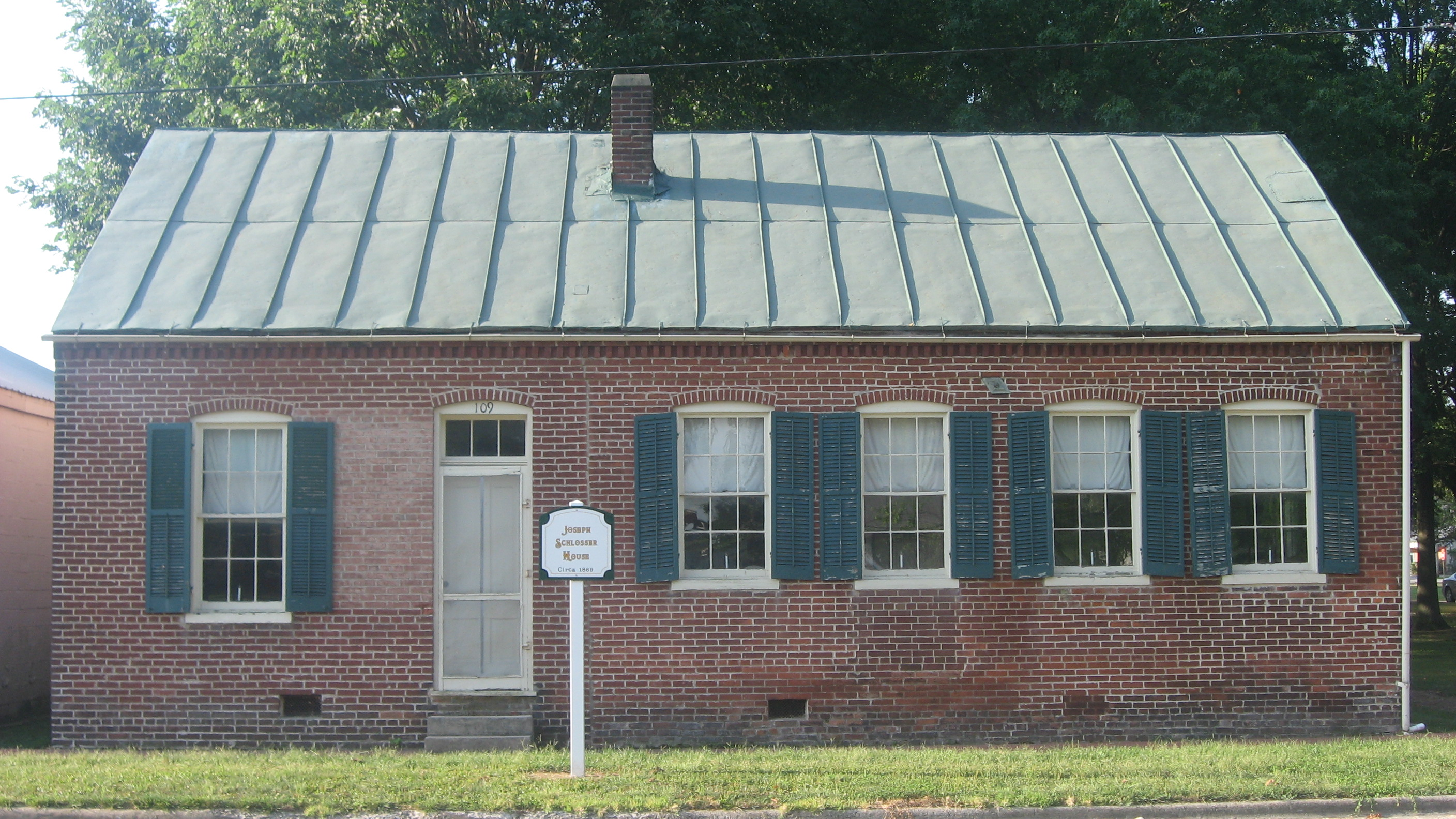
The Joseph Schlosser Home

The Heritage House Museum is a museum complex in Okawville, Illinois. The museum comprises three of the village's historic homes: the Frank Schlosser Complex, the Dr. Robert C. Poos Home, and the Joseph Schlosser Home. The three homes are open for public tours led by the Okawville Chamber of Commerce. The Frank Schlosser Complex was added to the National Register of Historic Places in 1983.

== Frank Schlosser Complex ==
- Frank Schlosser Complex
- U.S. National Register of Historic Places
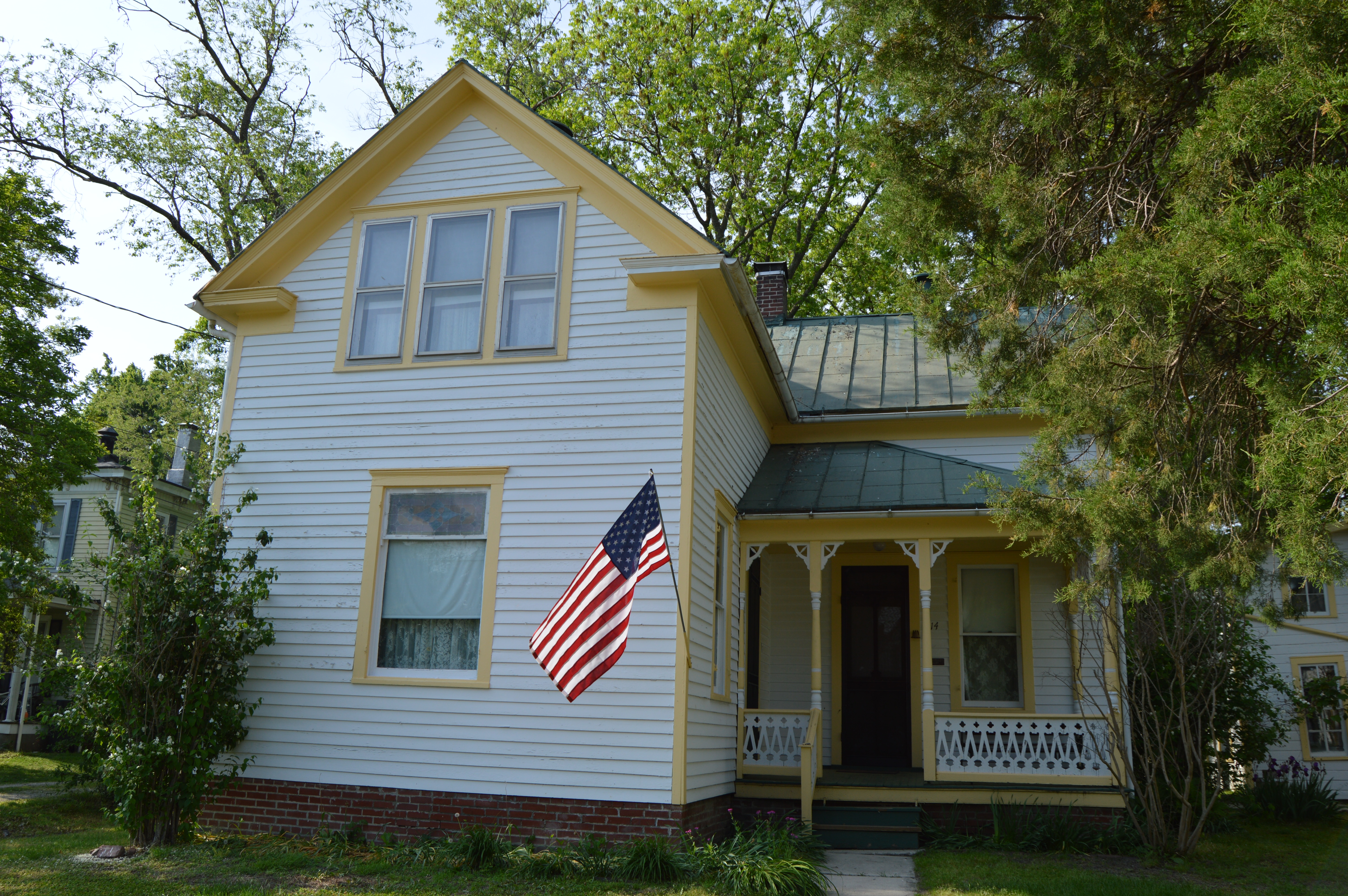
- Main house

- Location within Illinois Location within the United States
- Location: W. Walnut St., Okawville, Illinois
- Coordinates: 38°26′5″N 89°33′6″W
- Area: 0.4 acres (0.16 ha)
- Built: 1908
- NRHP reference No.: 83000337
- Added to NRHP: August 15, 1983

The Frank Schlosser Complex, located on West Walnut Street, includes the home and businesses of Frank Schlosser and his family. Frank Schlosser, an Okawville native born in 1867, opened a harness shop on the property in 1890. Schlosser's wife Sophia and his two daughters, Elsie and Estelle, operated a laundry in the back of the harness shop, which mainly catered to guests at Okawville's mineral spas. In 1908, the family built a house on the property. The wood frame house was designed in a vernacular style and features boxed eaves, a gable roof, and an open front porch. A two-story barn and several outbuildings are also located on the property. The complex was added to the National Register of Historic Places in 1983.

After Schlosser's daughters died in 1982, the home became a museum. The contents of the house are preserved from the time the Schlossers live there and portray the lifestyle of middle-class Okawville residents in the early 1900s. In addition, as the harness shop was shuttered from its closure in 1941 to the museum's establishment, its contents were preserved in their natural state and protected from light and other environmental damage. The laundry, which operated through the 1970s, contains the historic laundry equipment used by the sisters. The family's surrey and 1930 Buick are located in the barn; the surrey is occasionally used for events.

== Joseph Schlosser House ==
The Joseph Schlosser House, located across the street from the Frank Schlosser Complex, is a brick home built circa 1869. Joseph Schlosser, the father of Frank Schlosser, lived in the house with his wife and two sons. Schlosser, a Bavarian immigrant, ran a cobbler's shop from the home. The home is the last remaining Old World-style house, a type of house built near the street, in Okawville. The house includes period furniture from the post-Civil War era, little of which is original. The Okawville Chamber of Commerce headquarters and the Heritage House Museum headquarters are located in the home.

== Dr. Robert C. Poos Home ==
The Dr. Robert C. Poos Home, located at 202 North Front Street, is a Second Empire house constructed in 1888. The house was owned by Dr. Robert C. Poos, a local doctor and staff physician at the Washington Springs Hotel and Bathhouse. Poos built an outbuilding on his property which he intended to use as a privately run bathhouse; however, after failing to acquire mineral water, Poos never actually opened the bathhouse. Poos' family lived in the house until the 1980s and donated it to the Heritage House Museum in 1991. The house is now a museum of Victorian furnishings and artifacts and includes a collection of historic photographs of Okawville; the bathhouse houses a museum of medical instruments.
