= First Presbyterian Church (Vandalia, Illinois) =

Historic church in Illinois, United States

- U.S. National Register of Historic Places
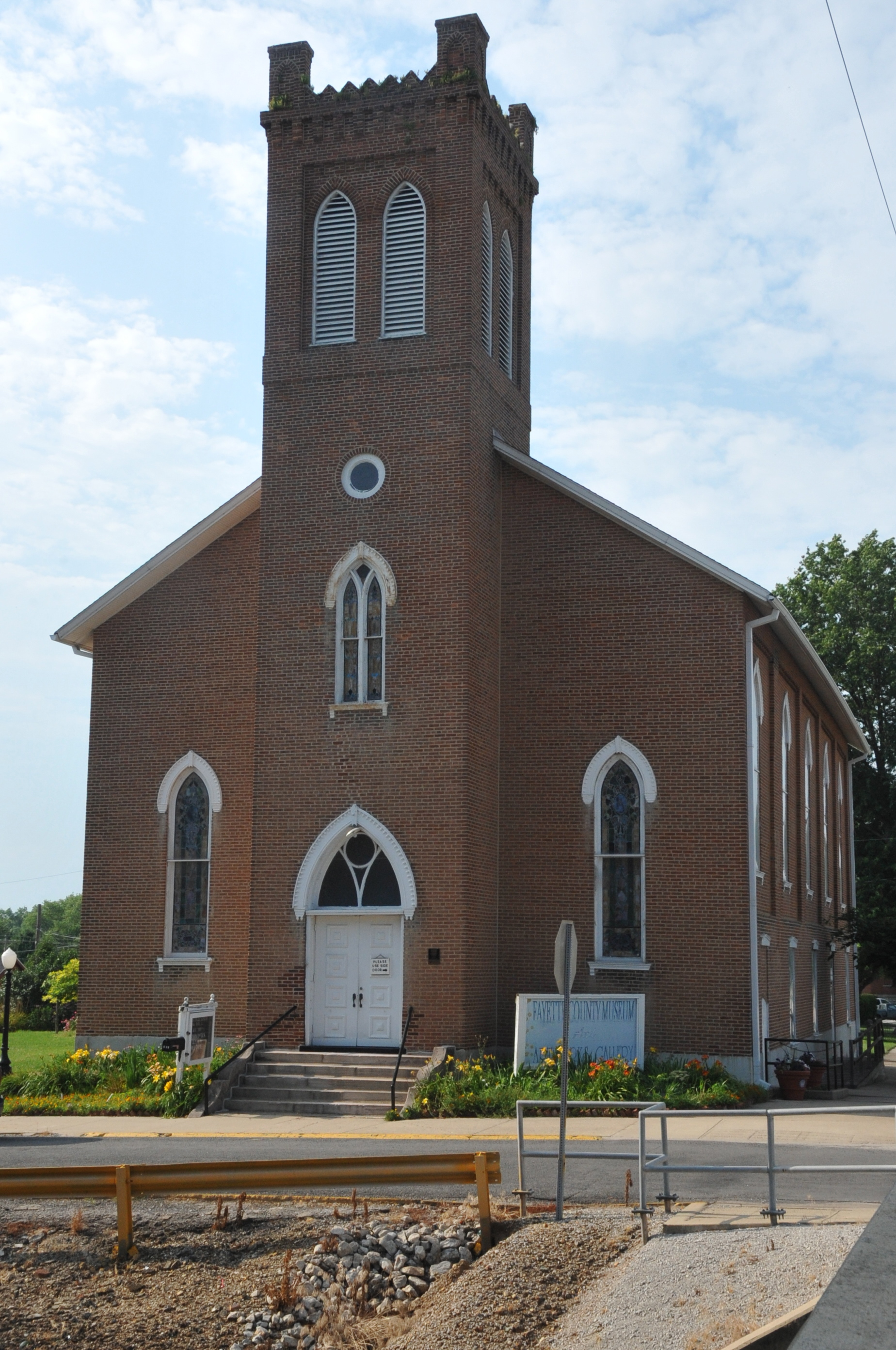
- Front of the church

- Location within Illinois Location within the United States
- Location: 301 W. Main St., Vandalia, Illinois
- Coordinates: 38°58′5″N 89°6′7″W
- Area: less than one acre
- Built: 1868
- Architectural style: Gothic Revival
- NRHP reference No.: 82002534
- Added to NRHP: March 24, 1982

The First Presbyterian Church is a museum and former Presbyterian church located at 301 W. Main St. in Vandalia, Illinois. The church was built in 1868 on the site of the first Protestant church in Illinois. The first church at the site, the House of Divine Worship, was a non-denominational church built in 1823 by the Illinois State Legislature; at the time, Vandalia was the state capital, and the governor's house was located next to the church. The Presbyterian church, built after the state capital moved to Springfield, was designed in the Gothic Revival style. The red brick church has a 60-foot (18 m) tall bell tower. The church has twelve Gothic pointed arch windows; each window has an oval stained glass pattern depicting a religious scene. Vandalia's Presbyterian congregation left the building for a new church in the 1960s, and the building is now used as the Fayette County Museum.

The building was added to the National Register of Historic Places on March 24, 1982. It is one of four sites on the National Register in Fayette County.
