= J. T. and E. J. Crumbaugh Library =

Coordinates: 40.347135°N 88.758037°W

The J. T. and E. J. Crumbaugh Spiritualist Church and Public Library is a building housing both a church and a library in LeRoy, Illinois, opened on January 1, 1927. It was built after the deaths of James Thomas Crumbaugh and his wife Elizabeth Jane Crumbaugh as a memorial in accordance with their will.

== History of the Library ==
The library was donated to the community by James Thomas Crumbaugh. James Thomas was born on January 24, 1832, in the Empire Township of McLean County, Illinois. His parents were Daniel and Martha M. Robinson who were of German descent. J. T. grew up in McLean County with his twin brother Daniel T. Crumbaugh whom he would later become partners with on their farm. After a few years J. T. decided to rent out his farms and move to the town of LeRoy where he built his house at 313 East Center Street. J. T., along with his other brother, Leonard A. Crumbaugh and friend James Bonnette went on to establish the Citizens Bank, which would later become The first National Bank. On September 13, 1862, J. T. married Elizabeth Jane Wiley. Elizabeth was born on November 17, 1841, and was also raised in McLean County. Together they had one child together, a son only known as “Bright Eyes,” who was born on July 2, 1865, and later died on August 20 of the same year. The death of their son deepened the Crumbaugh’s interest in spiritualism which would stay with them for the rest of their lives.

J. T. died on April 3, 1905, and Elizabeth followed less than a year later on January 24, 1906. Their will stated their desire for a library and a spiritualist church be built as a living memorial. Their heirs tried to fight the decision but their wishes were eventually upheld after five years of litigation. The library was opened on January 1, 1927, along with the Spiritualist Church both of which are still in use today.

== Architecture of the Library ==
The construction of the library and church was entrusted to F. C. Swartz, of Villa Grove, Illinois, for $60,000. The building itself was designed by Mr. A. L. Pillsbury of Bloomington, Illinois. Originally planned to be two separate buildings, it was decided to join them making one wing for the church and another for the library. The building has a colonial design and is made of Danville red brick along with Bedford stone finish. The stone carvings were done by Joseph Petarde. Petarde was originally from Rome, Italy but later lived in Peoria, Illinois, and Bloomington, Illinois. His work can also be seen at Illinois Wesleyan School of Music, the Bloomington Center for the Performing Arts (formerly "The Consistory"), the McBarnes Memorial Building in Bloomington, the gymnasium in Illinois State University, and St. Peter's Church in Peoria.

== The Library ==
The library itself is home to an estimated 14,000 volumes in a wide variety of genres. Since it is an endowed library any person is able to obtain a library card for free. In addition to its books, the library also provides computers, internet use and printer. It also has copies of the LeRoy Journal, the local newspaper, going back to 1903 on micro film.

== Genealogy Section ==
The Crumbaugh Library's genealogy section began in the fall of 1977, with the Crumbaugh family bibles and family history were put on file at the library. Since then, the section has acquired over 500 family histories, mostly of local families. Any person can donate their family’s history to become a part of the genealogy section, which is for research purposes only, so the documents are not allowed out of the library. In addition to the LeRoy Journals the library has on file, they also have a large collection of LeRoy High School yearbooks going back to 1920. Other resources include: indexes of the marriages and deaths in LeRoy, as well as the Saybrook area, a collection of The Farmer City Mirror, a publication of the Farmer City Genealogical and Historical Society, a collection of The Gleanings, the McLean County Genealogical Society publication, and Oak Grove Cemetery records.

== Museum ==
The J. T. and E. J. Crumbaugh Library also houses the Empire Township Historical Museum which is dedicated to the history of LeRoy and Empire Township. The museum is located on the lower level of the library. It originally was opened by the LeRoy Historical Society; however, after the Historical Society disbanded in 2006 it reopened in 2008 through the efforts of a group of community volunteers. The museum contains memorabilia relevant to LeRoy’s history, including items from local businesses, schools and organizations and has a collaborative partnership with the LeRoy Community Unit School District #2.
