= Emmert-Zippel House =

Historic house in Illinois, United States

- U.S. National Register of Historic Places
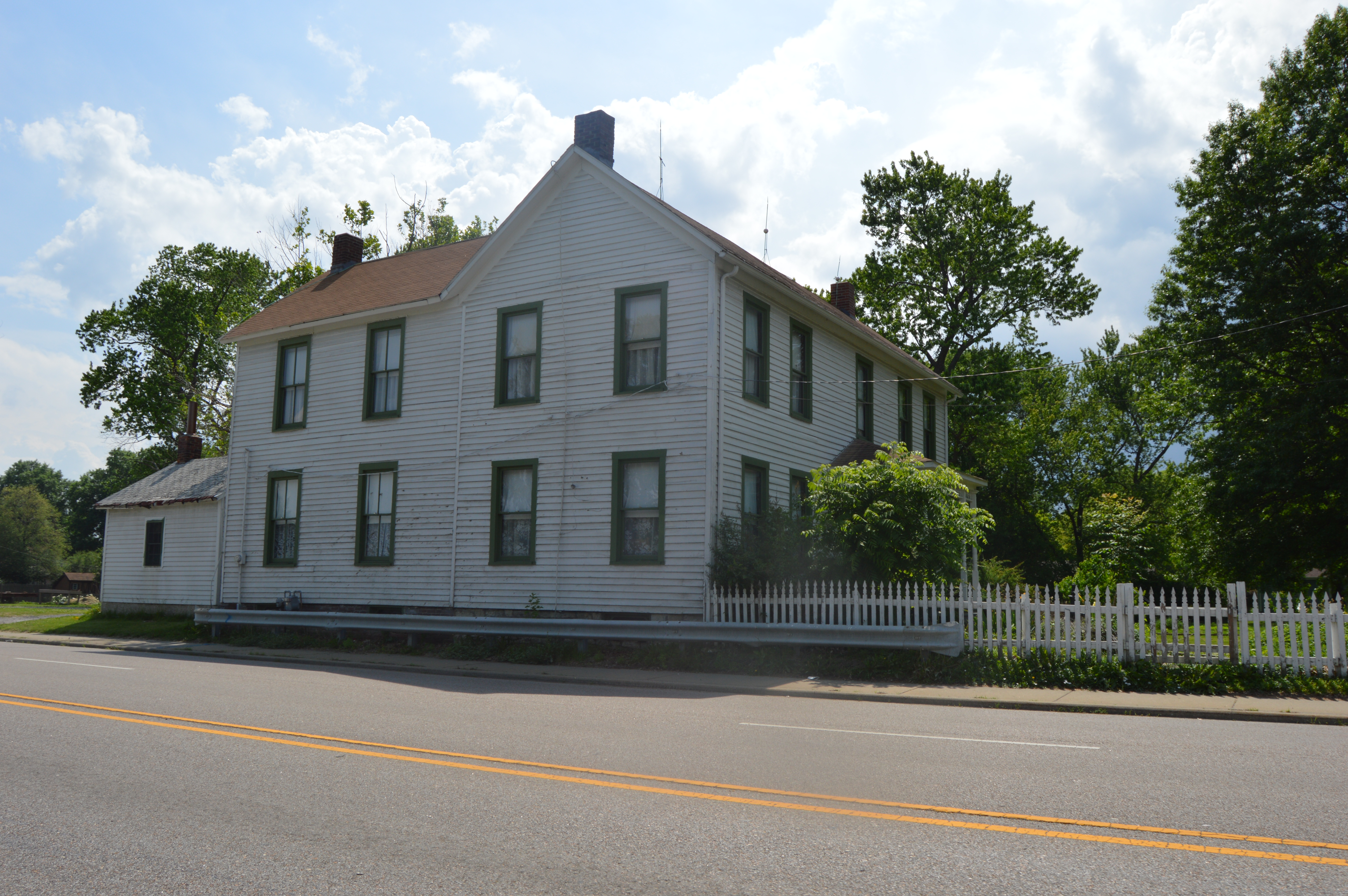
- Comprehensive view from across the road

- Location within Illinois Location within the United States
- Location: 3279 Maryville Rd., 2mi. N of IL 162, Granite City, Illinois
- Coordinates: 38°43′19″N 90°6′15″W
- Area: 1.6 acres (0.65 ha)
- Built: 1837
- Architectural style: I-house
- NRHP reference No.: 96000511
- Added to NRHP: May 2, 1996

The Emmert-Zippel House is a historic house located at 3279 Maryville Road in Granite City, Illinois. William Emmert built the house in 1837. He married the following year. Then, he and his family lived in the house. At the time, the house was located in a rural setting in Granite City, which was then known as Six Mile due to its distance from St. Louis. The house is a five-bay I-house, a housing style named for its popularity in Illinois, Indiana, and Iowa. I-houses, including the Emmert-Zippel House, were two-story structures with two rooms on each floor connected by a central hall and staircase. Emmert lived in the house until 1881, and his family sold the house to August and Elizabeth Zippel in 1884.

The Zippel family lived in the house until 1984, when the Old Six Mile Historical Society bought the house and made it a museum, known as the Old Six Mile Museum.

The house was added to the National Register of Historic Places on May 2, 1996.
