= Manly-McCann House =

Historic house in Illinois, United States

- U.S. National Register of Historic Places
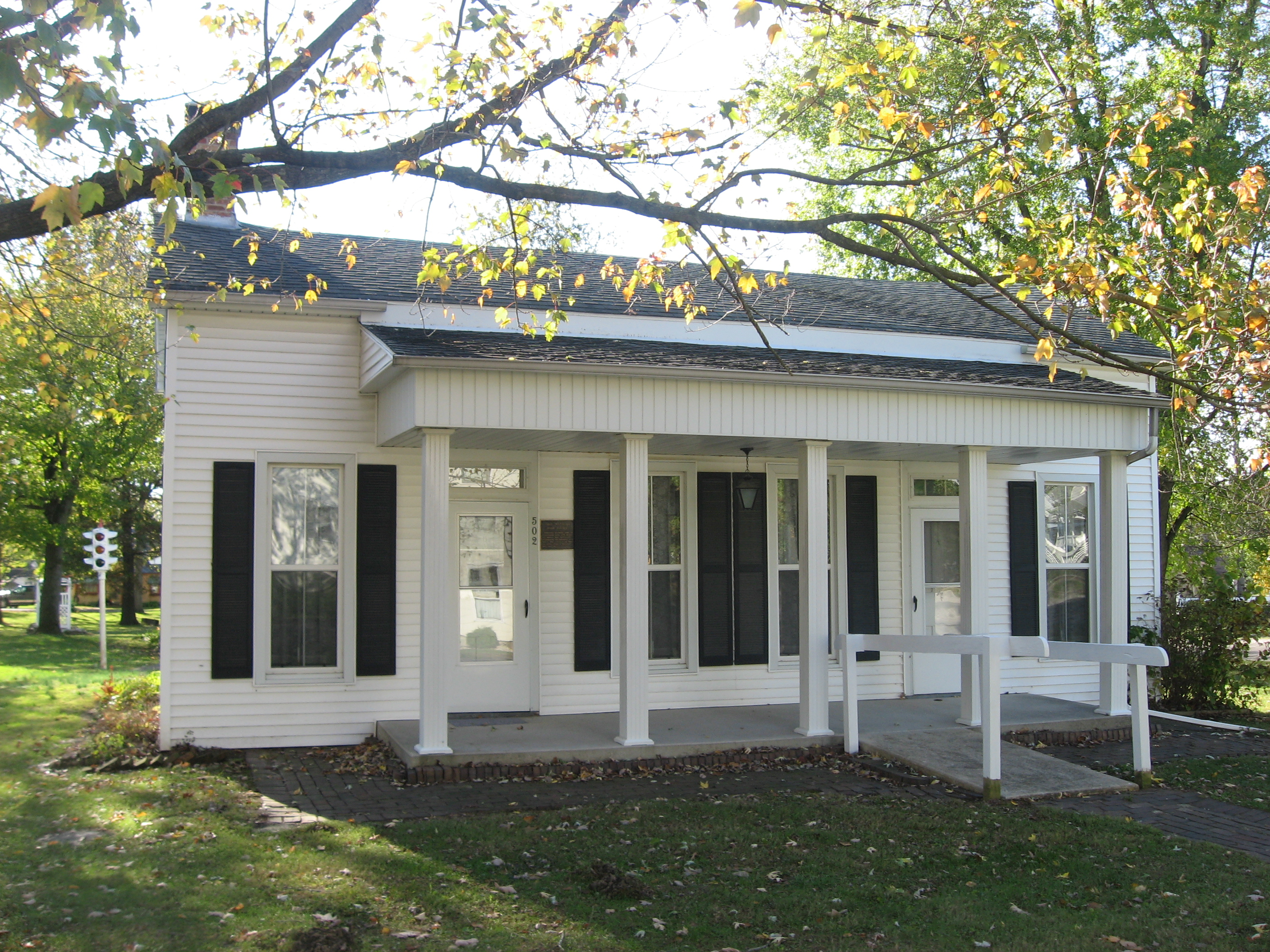
- The front of the house in 2011

- Location within Illinois Location within the United States
- Location: 402 S. 4th St., Marshall, Illinois
- Coordinates: 39°23′13″N 87°41′47″W
- Area: less than one acre
- Built: 1838
- Architectural style: Greek Revival
- NRHP reference No.: 82002520
- Added to NRHP: March 5, 1982

The Manly-McCann House is a historic building located at 402 S. 4th St. in Marshall, Illinois. The Greek Revival building was constructed in 1838 to serve as a temporary courthouse for Clark County. While Clark County moved its county seat to Marshall in 1837, a permanent courthouse could not be completed until 1839, so a smaller temporary building became necessary. After the county government relocated, Marshall postmaster Uri Manly moved the city's post office and his store to the building. The building later became a private home and had several owners; one of the longer owners of the house was the McCann family, who owned the house from 1891 to 1947 and constructed several additions on the rear. The Clark County Historical Society bought the house in 1968 and uses it as the county's historical museum.

The house was added to the National Register of Historic Places on March 5, 1982.
