= List of museums and cultural institutions in Chicago =

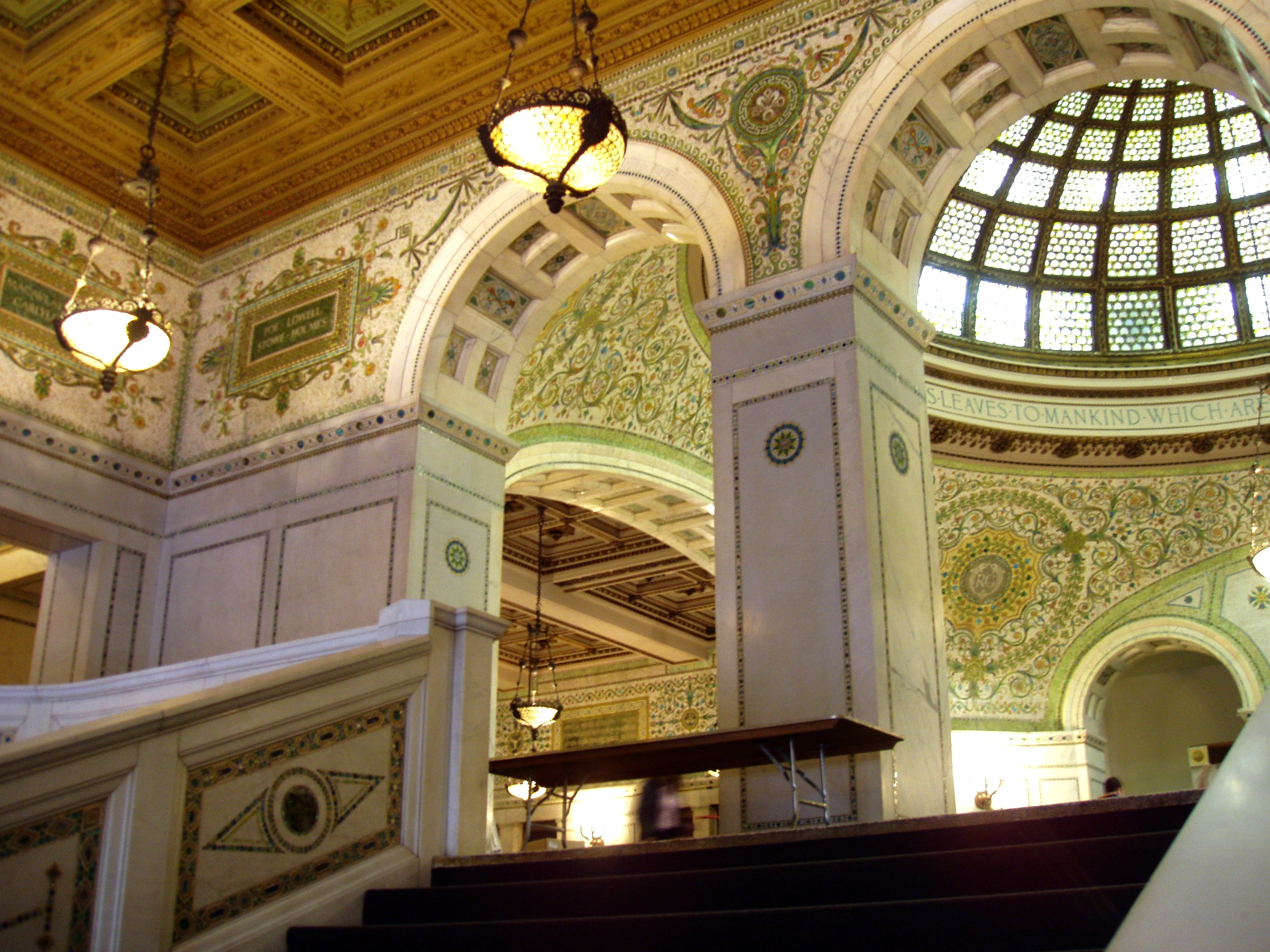
Chicago Cultural Center

The city of Chicago, Illinois, has many cultural institutions and museums, large and small. Major cultural institutions include:

- the Art Institute of Chicago, Chicago Symphony Orchestra, Chicago Architecture Center, Lyric Opera of Chicago, Goodman Theater, Joffrey Ballet, Central Public Harold Washington Library, and the Chicago Cultural Center, all in the Loop;
- the Field Museum, Shedd Aquarium, and Adler Planetarium in the Near South Side's Museum Campus;
- the Museum of Science and Industry, Institute for the Study of Ancient Cultures, Smart Museum of Art, and DuSable Museum in Hyde Park;
- Lincoln Park's Lincoln Park Zoo, Lincoln Park Conservatory, Chicago History Museum, Chicago Academy of Sciences/Peggy Notebaert Nature Museum and Steppenwolf Theatre;
- the Museum of Contemporary Art, The Second City comedy troupe, and the Chicago Shakespeare Theater in Near North Side;
- the Garfield Park Conservatory;
- and Pilsen's National Museum of Mexican Art.

In addition, the Brookfield Zoo, Chicago Botanic Gardens, Block Museum of Art, Illinois Holocaust Museum, Morton Arboretum and Illinois Railway Museum are in near suburbs.

== Museums ==
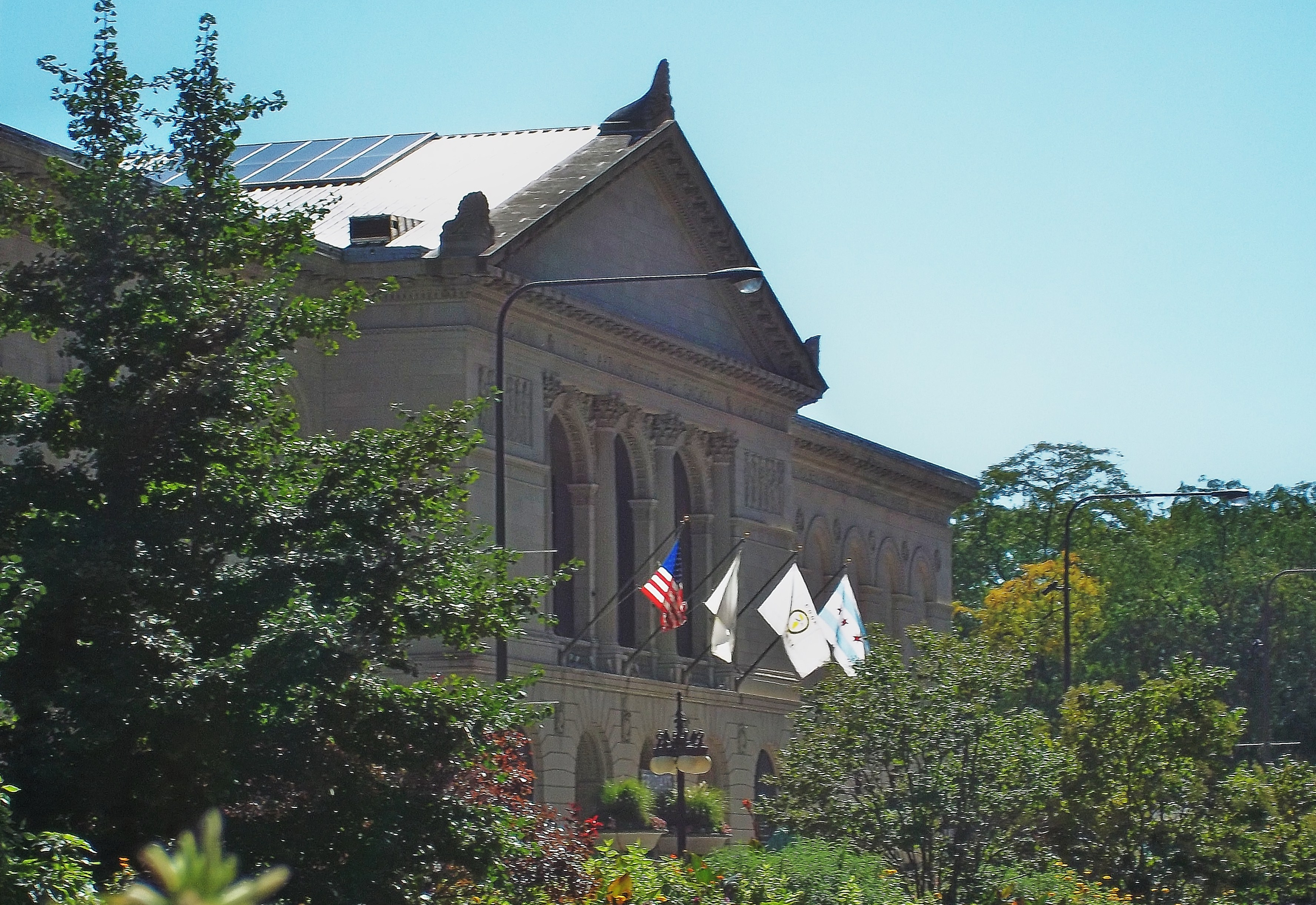
The Art Institute of Chicago

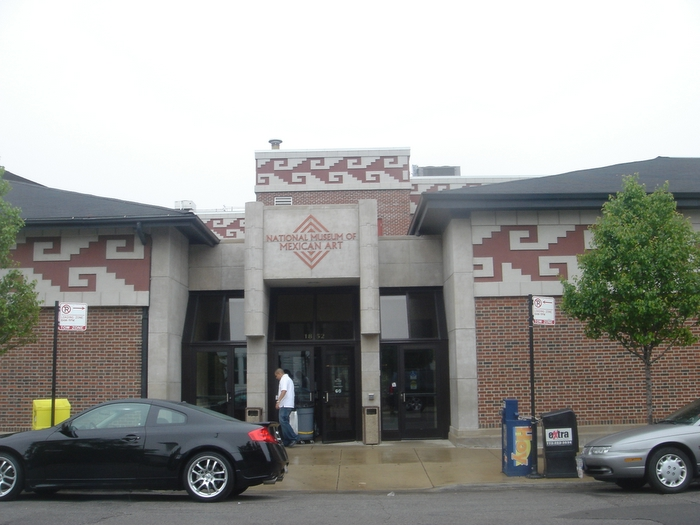
National Museum of Mexican Art

=== Art ===
- Art Institute of Chicago, second largest art museum in the United States
- The Arts Club of Chicago
- Chicago Athenaeum
- Chicago Cultural Center
- DePaul Art Museum (DePaul University)
- Design Museum of Chicago
- Intuit Art Museum
- Loyola University Museum of Art
- Museum of Contemporary Art
- Museum of Contemporary Photography
- National Museum of Mexican Art
- National Veterans Art Museum
- Smart Museum of Art (University of Chicago)
- Ukrainian Institute of Modern Art
- Polish Museum of America

=== Architecture ===
- Charnley–Persky House
- Chicago Architecture Center
- Driehaus Museum
- Graham Foundation for Advanced Studies in the Fine Arts
- Robie House

=== Children's ===
- Bronzeville Children's Museum
- Chicago Children's Museum
- Swedish American Museum and Children's Museum of Immigration

=== Chicago History ===
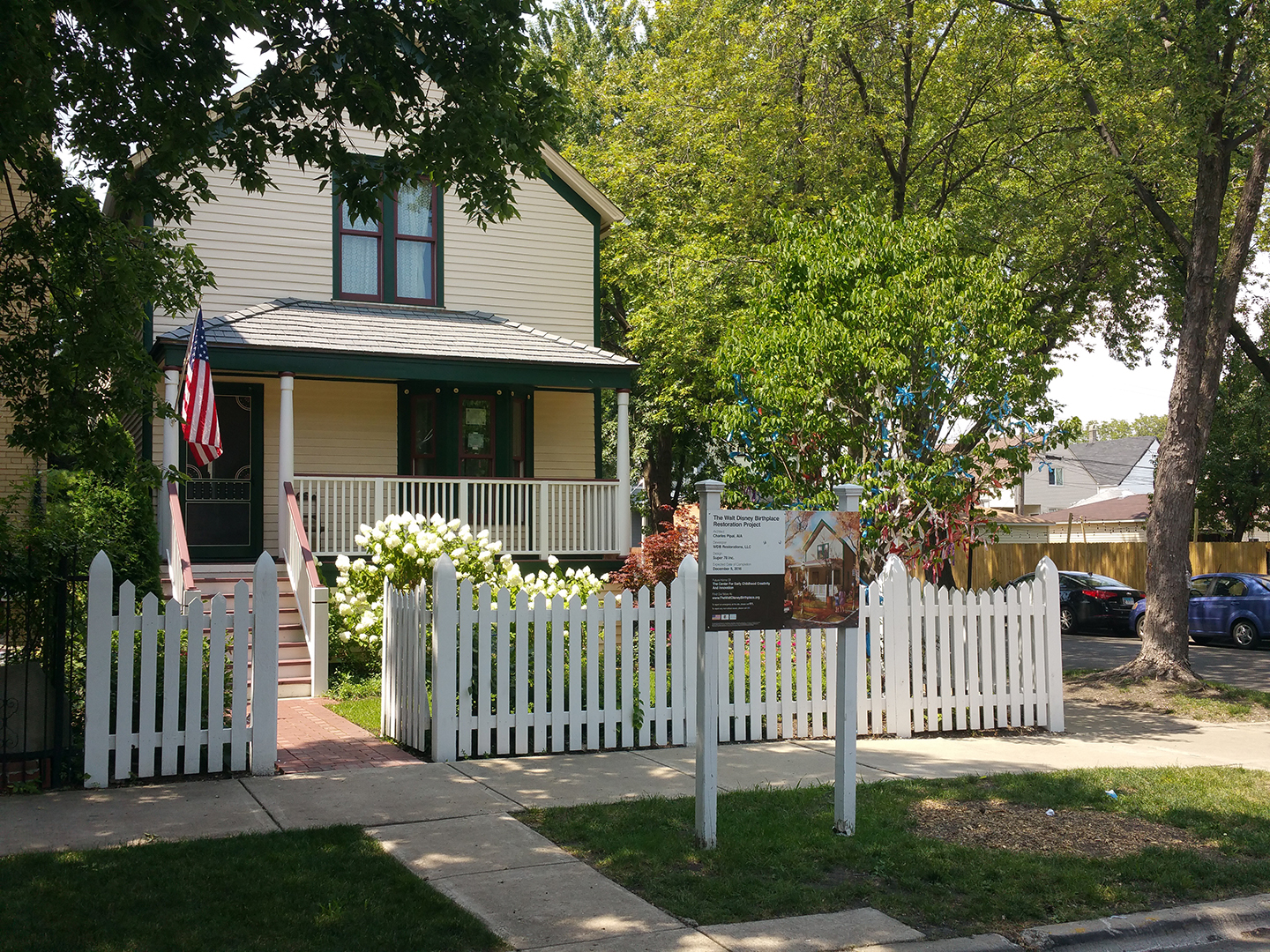
Walt Disney Birthplace (exterior) Hermosa Chicago Illinois

- Chicago History Museum
- Chicago Maritime Museum
- Clarke House Museum
- Edgewater Historical Society & Museum
- Glessner House Museum
- Jane Addams Hull-House Museum
- Made in Chicago Museum
- McCormick Bridgehouse & Chicago River Museum
- Norwood Park Historical Society Museum
- The Walt Disney Birthplace
- Rogers Park/West Ridge Historical Society

=== Cultural ===
- Alliance Française de Chicago
- American Writers Museum
- Balzekas Museum of Lithuanian Culture
- Chinese-American Museum of Chicago
- DANK Haus German American Cultural Center
- DuSable Museum of African American History
- Gichigamiin Indigenous Nations Museum
- Haitian American Museum of Chicago
- Irish American Heritage Center
- Lithuanian Research and Studies Center
- National Hellenic Museum
- National Italian American Sports Hall of Fame
- National Museum of Puerto Rican Arts and Culture
- Polish Museum of America
- Spertus Institute for Jewish Learning and Leadership
- Swedish American Museum Center
- Ukrainian National Museum

=== Specialized/historical ===
- A. Philip Randolph Pullman Porter Museum
- Barack Obama Presidential Center
- Chicago Sports Museum
- Leather Archives and Museum
- Money Museum
- Museum of Broadcast Communications
- National Public Housing Museum
- Pritzker Military Museum & Library
- American Toby Jug Museum
- Vegan Museum

=== Science, archeology, and natural history ===
- Adler Planetarium
- Field Museum of Natural History
- International Museum of Surgical Science
- Museum of Science and Industry
- Institute for the Study of Ancient Cultures, West Asia & North Africa (formerly the Oriental Institute)
- Peggy Notebaert Nature Museum

=== Planned museums ===
- National Museum of Gospel Music

=== Defunct museums ===
- ABA Museum of Law, closed in 2011
- American Police Center & Museum
- McCormick Tribune Freedom Museum, closed in 2009
- Museum of Holography
- The Peace Museum
- Smith Museum of Stained Glass Windows, closed in 2014
- Terra Museum, closed on October 31, 2004, its foundation still exists and artworks travel.

== Not-for-profit and university galleries ==
- American Academy of Art - Bill L. Parks Gallery
- Anchor Graphics, Columbia College Chicago
- ARC Gallery
- Beacon Street Gallery and Performance Company
- Boeing Galleries
- Bridgeport Art Center
- Catholic Theological Union - The Mary-Frances and Bill Veeck Gallery
- Center for Book and Paper Arts, Columbia College Chicago
- Chicago Architecture Foundation
- Chicago State University - President's Gallery and University Gallery
- City Gallery at the Historic Water Tower
- Columbia College Chicago - Glass Curtain Gallery, Hokin Gallery and Annex
- Copernicus Foundation
- DePaul Art Museum
- Gallery 400 at the University of Illinois at Chicago
- Hairpin Arts Center
- Hyde Park Art Center
- Illinois Institute of Technology - Kemper Gallery in the Galvin Library
- ISM Chicago Gallery
- John David Mooney Foundation - International Currents Gallery
- Lillstreet Art Center
- Little Black Pearl Art & Design Center
- Loyola University Chicago - Crown Center Gallery
- Marwen
- Northeastern Illinois University - Fine Arts Gallery
- Old Town Triangle Art Center
- The Palette and Chisel Academy of Fine Arts
- Renaissance Society
- Robert Morris University Illinois - State Street Gallery
- Roosevelt University - Gage Gallery
- Saint Xavier University - SXU Gallery
- School of the Art Institute of Chicago - Sullivan Galleries and Betty Rymer Gallery
- South Side Community Art Center
- South Shore Cultural Center
- Spudnik Press Cooperative
- University of Chicago Galleries - Logan Center, Neubauer Family Collegium for Culture and Society Gallery, and Regenstein Library exhibits
- Woman Made Gallery

== Botany/Zoology ==
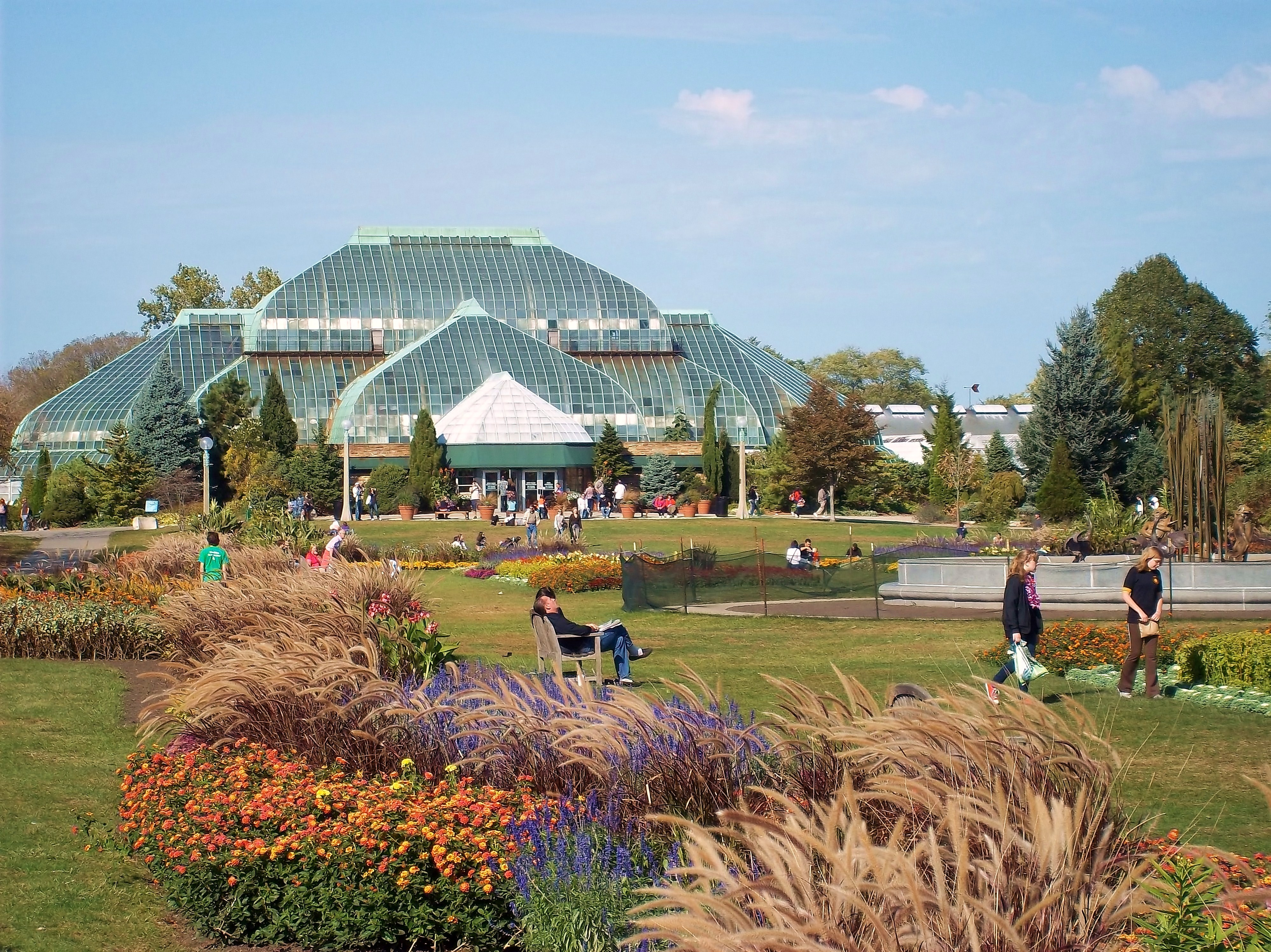
Lincoln Park Conservatory

- Garfield Park Conservatory
- Lincoln Park Conservatory
- Lincoln Park Zoo
- Shedd Aquarium

== Libraries ==
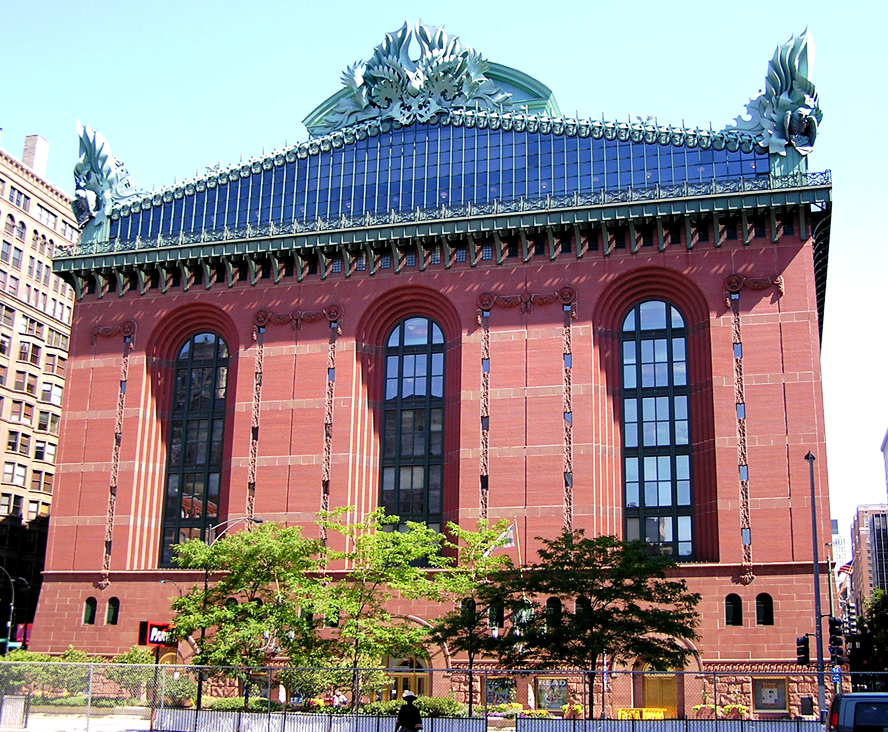
Chicago's Central Public Library

- Chicago Public Library
- Gerber/Hart Library
- John Crerar Library
- Newberry Library
- Poetry Foundation
- Ryerson & Burnham Libraries

== Music, theater, and performing arts ==
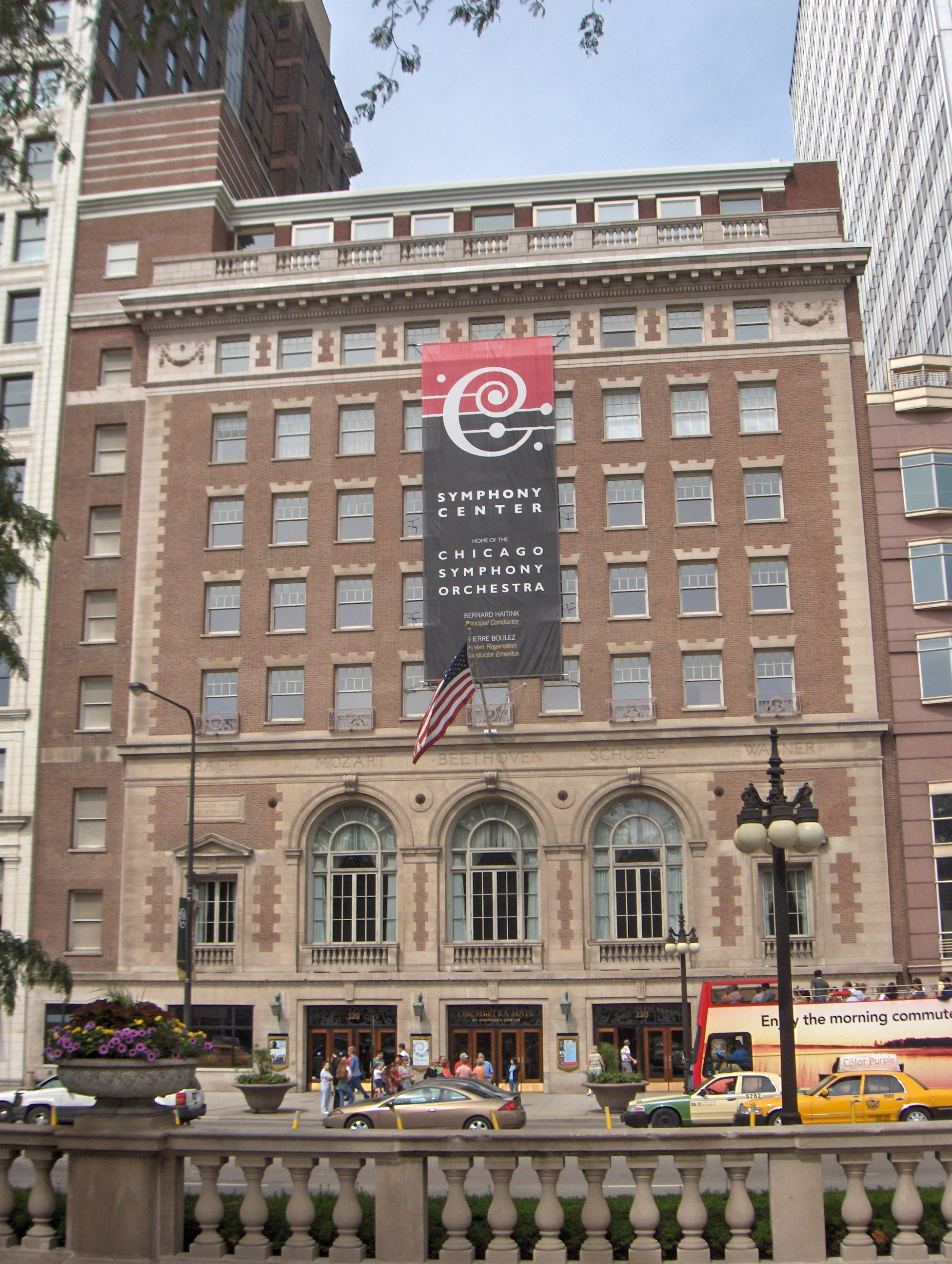
Symphony Center

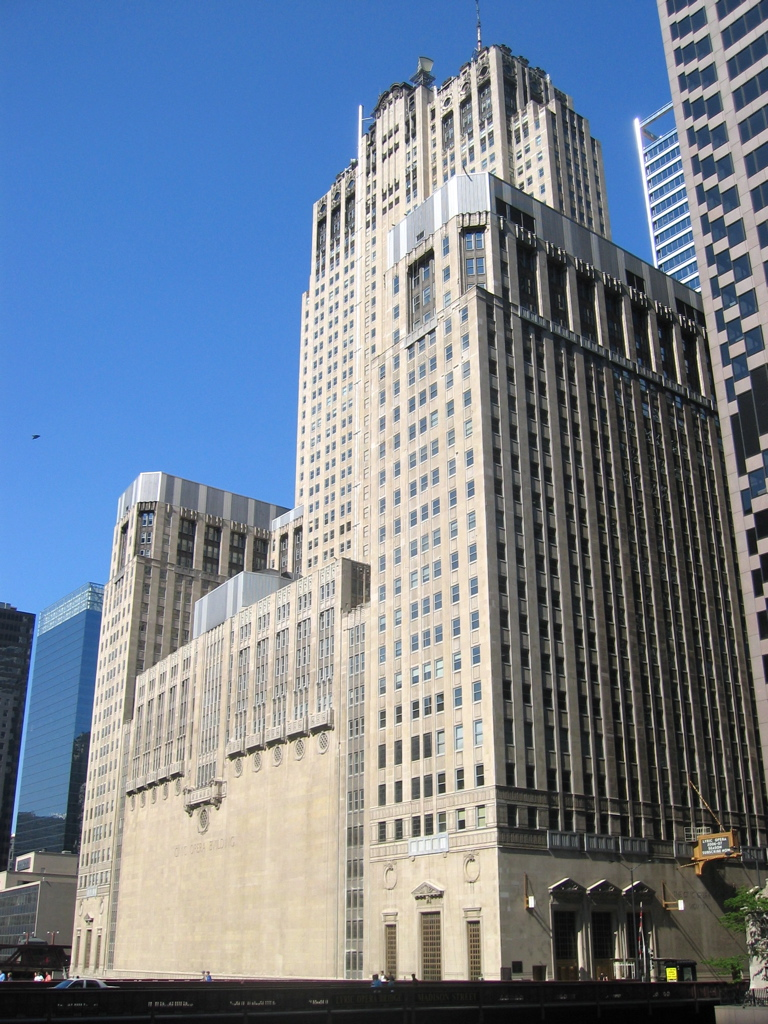
Civic Opera House

=== Dance ===
- Chicago Ballet
- Chicago Dance Crash
- Chicago Festival Ballet
- Clinard Dance
- DanceWorks Chicago
- Giordano Jazz Dance Chicago
- Hedwig Dances
- Hubbard Street Dance Chicago
- Joel Hall Dancers
- Joffrey Ballet
- River North Chicago Dance Company
- Ruth Page Center for the Arts (Ruth Page Civic Ballet)
- Thodos Dance Chicago

=== Opera ===
- Chamber Opera Chicago
- Chicago Opera Theater
- DuPage Opera Theatre
- Light Opera Works
- Lithuanian Opera Company of Chicago
- Lyric Opera of Chicago
- Opera in Focus

==== Opera houses ====
- Civic Opera House
- DuPage Opera Theatre
- Woodstock Opera House

=== Symphony ===
- Chicago Sinfonietta
- Chicago Symphony Orchestra
- Grant Park Symphony Orchestra

=== Choruses ===
- Apollo Chorus of Chicago
- Bella Voce
- Chicago a cappella
- Uniting Voices Chicago, previously known as the Chicago Children's Choir
- Chicago Chorale
- Chicago Gay Men's Chorus
- Chicago Symphony Chorus

=== Music venues ===
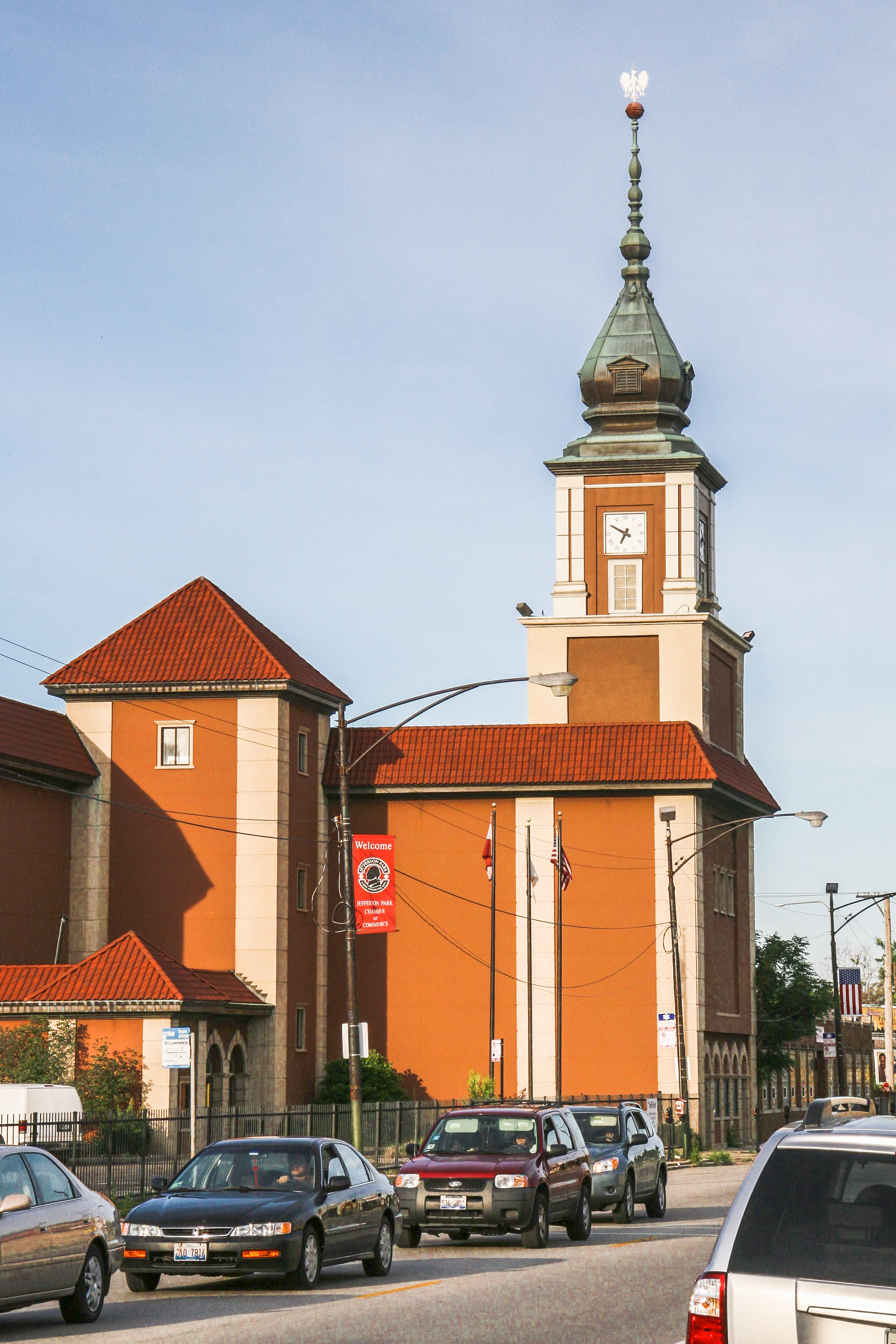
The Gateway Theatre is located in the Chicago neighborhood of Jefferson Park.

- Gateway Theater
- Harris Theater
- Jay Pritzker Pavilion
- Metro
- Petrillo Music Shell
- Riviera Theatre
- Rosemont Theater
- Symphony Center

== Online museums ==
- The Museum of Classic Chicago Television
- Museum of Holography

== Organizations ==
- Chicago Art Dealers Association
- Chicago Artists' Coalition
- Chicago Department of Cultural Affairs and Special Events
- Chicago Public Art Group
- Chicago Public Art Program
- Chicago Society of Artists
- Flat Iron Artists Association
- Illinois Artisans Program
- Illinois Arts Council
- Jazz Institute of Chicago
- Lawyers for the Creative Arts
- League of Chicago Theatres
- Public Media Institute
- Terra Foundation for American Art

== See also ==
- Culture of Chicago
- List of colleges and universities in Chicago
- List of museums in Illinois
- Music of Chicago
- River North Chicago
- Visual arts of Chicago
