= Law museum =

Law museum may refer to:

- ABA Museum of Law, in Chicago, Illinois
- American Museum of Tort Law, in Winsted, Connecticut
- Law Uk Folk Museum, in Hong Kong
