= Kate Elswit =

American dance academic

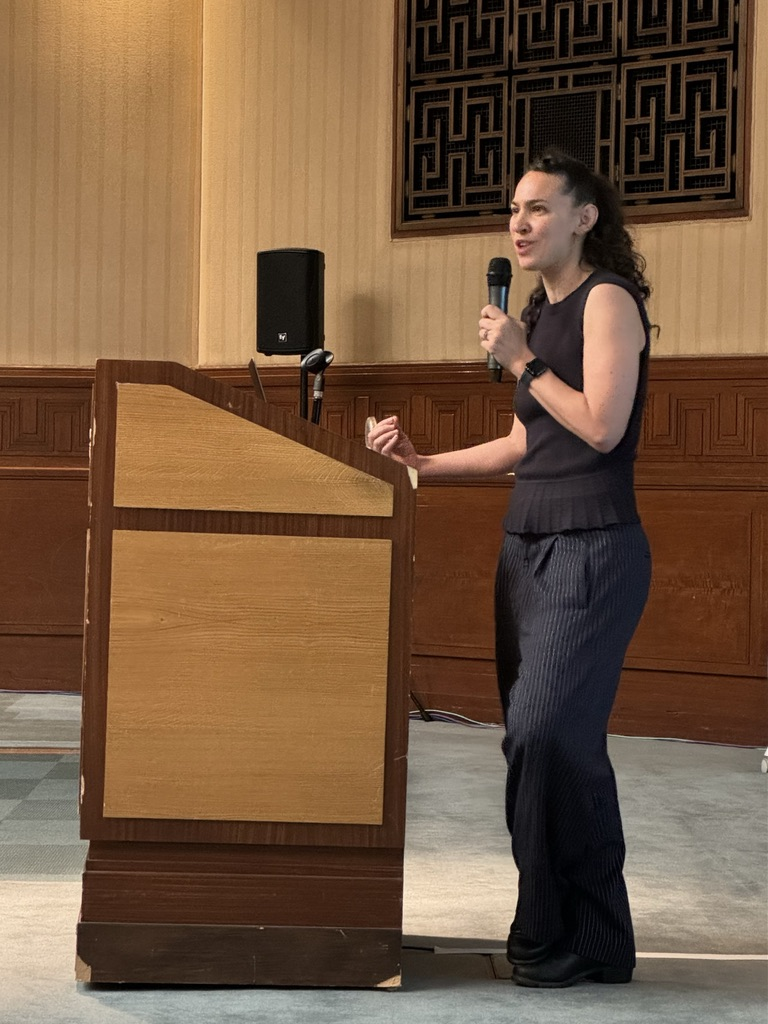
- Born: 1980 (age 45–46); New York City, U.S.
- Title: Professor

Academic background
- Education: Northwestern University (BA, BS); Trinity Laban Conservatoire of Music and Dance (MA); University of Cambridge (PhD)
- Doctoral advisor: Lucia Ruprecht

Academic work
- Discipline: Digital Humanities; History of Dance; Performance Studies
- Institutions: University of London, Royal Central School of Speech and Drama
- Website: https://www.kateelswit.org/

Kate Elswit (born 1980) is an American dance scholar and the head of digital research at Royal Central School of Speech and Drama. Elswit is Professor of performance and technology, as well as a practicing artist.

== Early life ==
Elswit grew up in New York City, the daughter of folklorist Sharon and Michael Elswit.

== Education ==
Elswit received a B.A. and B.S. from Northwestern University in 2002 before being awarded a Marshall Scholarship in 2004 to complete a M.A. at the Trinity Laban Conservatoire of Music and Dance. She then went on to earn Ph.D. at the University of Cambridge. Her dissertation dealt with Weimar era dance audiences and modernism, under the direction of supervisor Lucia Ruprecht.

Elswit was an Andrew W. Mellon Postdoctoral Fellow at Stanford University from 2009-2012, and then a senior lecturer in theatre and performance studies at the University of Bristol from 2012-2016. She was appointed reader at Central in 2016 and later promoted to full professor.

She is the co-founder of the Centre for Performance, Technology & Equity at Central, an associate editor of Theatre Journal, an associate editor in Drama, Dance, Performance of ASAP/Journal, and is a member of the Peer Review College of the United Kingdom's Arts and Humanities Research Council. Elswit is co-editor of the New World Choreographies book series, and also sits on the editorial board for Performance Matters as well as the college of expert reviewers for the European Science Foundation. She has been granted over £1 million since 2018 for a variety of different research projects focused on dance and archival material.

== Moving Data Studio ==
In 2021, Elswit co-founded the information visualization and interaction design company Moving Data Studio, with Ohio State University professor Harmony Bench. Their project Dunham's Data: Katherine Dunham and Digital Methods for Dance Historical Inquiry won the 2021 ATHE/ASTR Award for Excellence in Digital Scholarship.

Moving Data Studio's breakaway archival and information visualization installation about Alvin Ailey was commissioned by the Whitney Museum of American Art exhibition Edges of Ailey exhibit in 2024. The Observer called this information visualization an "unexpected delight."

== Awards and accolades ==
Elswit's book Watching Weimar Dance was called "groundbreaking" by the Times Literary Supplement, and won the Oscar G. Brockett Book Prize for Dance Research in 2017. It also inspired Constanza Macras/Dorky Park's production of Goodbye Berlin at the Volksbühne.

Other awards include:

- American Society for Theatre Research's, Sally Banes Publication Prize in 2008
- Dance Studies Association's Gertrude Lippincott Award in both 2010 and 2022
- ATHE-ASTR Award for Excellence in Digital Scholarship in 2021

== Performance and art ==
As a modern dancer, Elswit has performed with Hedwig Dances, Lucky Plush Productions, Felix Ruckert, and others. She collaborates with Swedish choreographer Rani Nair as dramaturg and historian on the Future Memory project. Elswit was also choreographer and performer in Breath Catalogue, an experimental dance performance which combined choreography with live breath sensors and interactive visualizations.

== Publications ==
=== Books ===
- Watching Weimar Dance. Oxford University Press, New York 2014, ISBN 9780199844838
- Theatre & Dance. Palgrave Macmillan, London 2018, ISBN 978-1137605740

=== Articles ===
- “The Some of the Parts: Prosthesis and Function in Bertolt Brecht, Oskar Schlemmer, and Kurt Jooss”. Modern Drama, 51.3 (2008), Theatre and Medicine, 389-410.
- “‘Berlin . . . Your Dance Partner is Death’”. TDR/The Drama Review, 53.1 (2009), 73-92.
- “So You Think You Can Dance Does Dance Studies”. TDR/The Drama Review, 56.1 (2012), 133-142.
- “Ten Evenings with Pina: Bausch’s ‘Late’ Style and the Cultural Politics of Co-Production”. Theatre Journal, 65.2 (2013), 215-233.
- “Dancing With Our Coronasphere to Navigate the Pandemic”. Dance Magazine (July 2020).
- “Dancing with Coronaspheres: Expanded Breath Bodies and the Politics of Public Movement in the Age of COVID-19”. Cultural Studies 37.6 (2022), 894-916.
- “Visceral Data for Dance Histories: Katherine Dunham’s People, Places, and Pieces” (with Harmony Bench). TDR: The Drama Review 66.1 (2022), 37-61.

=== Talks ===
- Making Breath Palpable: Theatricality, Somatics, and Technology in Uncertain Archives. Gerrit Rietveld Academie, Stedelijk Museum Amsterdam (2018).
- Dance, Bodies, and the Digital: Digital Methods for Movement on the Move. UT Humanities Center Distinguished Lecture Series, University of Tennessee. (2019)
