= Barbara Cooper =

Barbara Cooper may refer to:

- Barbara Cooper (politician) (1929–2022), American politician
- Barbara Cooper (RAF officer) (born 1959), British Royal Air Force officer
- Barbara Cooper (artist) (born 1949), American artist
- Barbara Cooper (physicist) (1953–1999), American physicist
- Barbara Cooper (water skier), World Champion water skier
