= Gertrude Lippincott Award =

Dance studies award

The Gertrude Lippincott Award is an annual award for the best English-language article in the field of dance studies. Previously it was awarded by the Society of Dance History Scholars; since 2017 it has been awarded by the Dance Studies Association.

The $500 award was named after modern dance teacher and mentor Gertrude Lippincott and honors exemplary dance scholarship. Ms. Lippincott was herself honored in 1973 with the National Dance Association's Heritage Award for her contributions to dance education. She was one of the founders of the Congress on Research in Dance and of the Modern Dance Center of Minneapolis. She was also an editor for the periodicals Dance Observer and Dance Magazine.

== Award winners ==
- 2022 - Royona Mitra, “Unmaking Contact: Choreographic Touch at the Intersections of Race, Caste, and Gender” (Dance Research Journal, 2021)
- 2022 - (Honorable Mention): Lindsey Drury, "The Double Life of Pagan Dance: Indigenous Rituality, Early Modern Dance, and the Language of US Newspapers” (European Journal of Theatre and Performance, 2021)
- 2021 - Jade Power-Sotomayor, "Moving Borders and Dancing in Place: Son Jarocho's Speaking Bodies at the Fandango Fronterizo" (TDR, 2020)
- 2021 - (Honorable Mention): Hannah Kosstrin, “Whose Jewishness? Inbal Dance Theater and Cold War American Spectatorship” (American Jewish History, 2020)
- 2020: Judith Hamera, “Rehearsal Problems: Gus Giordano’s ‘The Rehearsal’ and the Serious Business of Middlebrow Dance” in Theatre Journal (June 2019, Vol.71:2): 171-189.
- 2019 - Rizvana Bradley, “Black Cinematic Gesture and the Aesthetics of Contagion” in TDR (Spring 2018): 14-30
- 2018 - VK Preston, "Baroque Relations: Performing Silver and Gold in Daniel Rabel’s Ballet of the Americas," in The Oxford Handbook of Dance and Reenactment, edited by Mark Franko (New York: Oxford, 2017), pp. 285-310.
- 2017 - Kareem Khubchandani, “Snakes on the Dance Floor: Bollywood, Gesture, and Gender,” The Velvet Light Trap 77 (2016), pp. 69-85.
- 2016 - Brandon Shaw, “Phantom Limbs and the Weight of Grief in Sasha Waltz’s noBody” Theatre Journal 67 (2015), pp. 21-42.
- 2016 (Honorable Mention) - Andrea Harris, “Sur la Pointe on the Prairie: Giuseppina Morlacchi and the Urban Problem in the Frontier Melodrama,” in The Journal of American Drama and Theatre 27:1 (Winter 2015).
- 2015 - Sherril Dodds, “The Choreographic Interface: Dancing Facial Expression in Hip-Hop and Neo-Burlesque Striptease” in Dance Research Journal 46:Special Issue 02 (2014), pp. 39–56.
- 2014 - Alexandra Kolb, “The Migration and Globalization of Schuhplattler Dance: A Sociological Analysis” in Cultural Sociology 7:1, pp. 39–55
- 2013 - Anurima Banerji, “Dance and the Distributed Body: Odissi, Ritual Practice, and Mahari Performance” in About Performance 11: 7–39
- 2013 - J. Lorenzo Perillo, “‘If I was not in prison, I would not be famous’: Discipline, Choreography, and Mimicry in the Philippines” in Theatre Journal 63: 607–621.
- 2011 - Selby Wynn Schwartz, “Martha@Martha: A Séance with Richard Move” in Women & Performance: A Journal of Feminist Theory 20.1 (2010): 61–87.
- 2011 (Honorable Mention) - Öykü Potuoglu-Cook, “The Uneasy Vernacular: Choreographing Multiculturalism and Dancing Difference Away in Globalised Turkey” in Anthropological Notebooks 16.3 (2010): 93–105.
- 2010 - Kate Elswit, "'Berlin ... Your Dance Partner is Death" in TDR: The Drama Review, 53:1 2009, pp. 73–92.
- 2009 - Cindy Garcia, "Don't leave me Celia: Salsera homosociality and pan-Latina corporealities" in Women and Performance: A Journal of Feminist Theory, 18:3, pp. 199–213.,
- 2009 - honorable mention to Victoria Phillips Geduld, "Performing Communism in the American Dance: Culture, Politics, and the New Dance Group" in American Communist History 7:1, 2008, pp. 39–65.
- 2009 - honorable mention to Melissa Blanco Borelli, "Yahora que vas a hacer, mulata? Hip choreographies in the Mexican cabaretera film 'Mulata'" in Women and Performance: A Journal of Feminist Theory, 18:3, pp. 215–233.
- 2008 - Priya Srinivasan, "The Bodies Beneath the Smoke or What's Behind the Cigarette Poster: Unearthing Kinesthetic Connections in American Dance History" in Discourse in Dance, Ramsey Burt and Susan Leigh Foster, editors, Volume 4 Issue 1 2007, pp. 7–48.
- 2008 - Rebekah Kowal, "Dance Travels: 'Walking With Pearl'" Performance Research, 12(2), pp. 85–94, 2007.
- 2007 - Anthea Kraut, "Recovering Hurston, Reconsidering the Choreographer" which appeared in Women and Performance: A Journal of Feminist Theory, 16/1 (March 2006).
- 2007 - honorable mention to April K. Henderson, "Dancing Between Islands: Hip Hop and the Samoan Diaspora" which appeared in The Vinyl Ain't Final: Hip Hop and the Globalization of Black Popular Culture, Dipannita Basuand and Sidney J. Lemelle, eds., London: Pluto Press, 2006.
- 2006 - Kimerer LeMothe, " 'A God Dances through Me': Isadora Duncan on Friedrich Nietzsche's Revaluation of Values," Journal of Religion 85 (2), 2005, pp. 241–266.
- 2005 - No prize awarded.
- 2004 - Danielle Goldman, "Ghostcatching: An Intersection of Technology, Labor, and Race," Dance Research Journal v. 35/2 & 36/2 (Winter 2003 & Summer 2004 combined issue) pp. 68–87. 2004.
- 2003 - No prize awarded.
- 2002 - Theresa Jill Buckland, "Th'Owd Pagan Dance": Ritual, Enchantment, and an Enduring Intellectual Paradigm", in Journal for the Anthropological Study of Human Movement, vols 11, no. 4 and 12, no. 1, Fall 2001/Spring 2002.
- 2001 - Petra Kuppers, "Deconstructing Images: Performing Disability," Contemporary Theatre Review 11.3&4 (2001).
- 2000 - Anne Flynn and Lisa Doolittle, "Dancing in the Canadian Wasteland: A Post-Colonial Reading of Regionalism in the 1960s and 1970s," in Dancing Bodies, Living Histories: New Writing about Dance and Culture, edited by Anne Flynn and Lisa Doolittle (Banff Centre Press, 2000).
- 1999 - Susan C. Cook, "Watching Our Step: Embodying Research, Telling Stories," in Audible Traces: Gender, Identity, and Music, edited by Elaine Barkin and Lydia Hamessley (Zurich: Carciofoli Verlagshaus, 1999).
- 1998 - Ananya Chatterjea, "Chandralekha: Negotiating the Female Body and Movement in Cultural/Political Signification," Dance Research Journal 30.2 (Spring 1998).
- 1997 - Jody Bruner, "Redeeming Giselle: Making a Case for the Ballet We Love to Hate," in Rethinking the Sylph: New Perspectives on the Romantic Ballet, edited by Lynn Garafola (Middletown, Conn.: Wesleyan University Press, 1997).
- 1996 - Linda J. Tomko, "Fête Accompli: Gender, 'Folk Dance,' and Progressive-Era Political Ideals in New York City," in Corporealities: Dancing Knowledge, Culture, and Power, edited by Susan Leigh Foster (London and New York: Routledge, 1996).

== Resources ==
- Gertrude Lippincott Award
- SDHS Award Winners
- Society of Dance History Scholars
