= Barbara Cooper (artist) =

American sculptor

- Born: 1949 (age 76–77); Philadelphia, Pennsylvania, United States
- Education: Cranbrook Academy of Art, Cleveland Institute of Art
- Known for: Sculpture, public art, drawing
- Style: Organic abstraction
- Awards: National Endowment for the Arts, Illinois Arts Council
- Website: Barbara Cooper

Barbara Cooper, Cyclus, wood and glue, 44" x 46" x 26", 1994.

Barbara Cooper (born 1949) is an American artist whose practice encompasses abstract sculpture, public and installation art, drawing and set design. She is most known for her sculpture, which emphasizes process, handcraft, and its basis in natural forms and processes of transformation, such as growth, protection and regeneration. Critic Polly Ullrich writes that "Cooper's hand-intensive art is an art of condensation" that takes "the flow of time and growth as a subject"; that quality often leads writers to align Cooper with postminimalism. John Brunetti describes her work as "sinuous, tactile sculptures [that] quietly juxtapose conceptual and formal dichotomies, among them the organic and man-made, the feminine and the masculine, movement and stasis."

Cooper has exhibited at the Smithsonian American Art Museum, Museum of Contemporary Art, Chicago (MCA), Hafnarfjördur Centre of Culture and Fine Art (Iceland), and Bellevue Arts Museum, and been commissioned for public art works in cities including Chicago, Toledo, and Providence. Her work has been discussed in diverse publications, among them, Art in America, Arts Magazine, Sculpture, Fiberarts and American Craft, and belongs to public art collections including the Smithsonian Museum, MCA Chicago, and Long Beach Museum of Art.

== Early life and career ==
Cooper was born and raised in Philadelphia; her father was a biochemist and that influence is evident in her art. She studied fiber art at the Cleveland Institute of Art (BFA, 1974) and Cranbrook Academy of Art (MFA, 1977), before turning to sculpture influenced by artists such as Eva Hesse Jackie Winsor, and Giuseppe Penone and the Arte Povera movement. After graduating, she headed Syracuse University's fiber department, before moving to Bozeman, Montana in 1979 for a position teaching sculpture and drawing at Montana State University. In 1986, she relocated to Chicago, where she has taught at the Art Institute of Chicago (1987–2009) and Harper College (1988–2001).

During her first decade of professional exhibition, Cooper was featured in solo shows at the Yellowstone Art Museum (1985), Museum of Contemporary Art Cleveland (1985) and Artemisia Gallery (Chicago, 1987, 1988), and group shows at the Evanston Art Center, Hyde Park Art Center and Randolph Street Gallery, among others. In her later career, the Chicago Cultural Center (1994, 2006), Hafnarfjördur Centre (2003), John Michael Kohler Arts Center (2004), Bellevue Arts Museum (2007), and Gerald Peters (Santa Fe), Fassbender and Perimeter (both Chicago) galleries have held solo exhibitions of her work; she was also featured in the Smithsonian's "High Fiber" exhibition (2005). Cooper lives and works in Chicago.

== Work and reception ==
Critics often relate Cooper's work to postminimalist sculptors such as Magdalena Abakanowicz, Eva Hesse, Lenore Tawney and Jackie Winsor, who merged feminist concerns with process, the organic and craft with minimalist codes of repetition, geometric purity, and restraint. Writers also place her among a second generation of organic sculptors (including Joan Livingstone and Sheri Simons) who brought a new conceptual orientation and reductive elegance to fiber-related work, or liken her art to that of Martin Puryear.

Barbara Cooper, Mast, wood and glue, 85" x 55" x 32", 2000.

Cooper's work across media is united by several common themes: its basis in and abstraction of natural forms, temporal systems and patterns; a sense of movement that includes gesture, line and the activation of space; and its exploration of process and diverse materials. Curator Mary Jane Jacob wrote that "Cooper is fascinated by the 'brain' of nature," the way organisms respond to external stresses and need by producing unique growth patterns and distortions in order to build strength and resilience, repair and re-balance. In her mature, post-1987 work, Cooper employs working methods derived from both her early fiber training—plaiting and the organic, linear build of spinning and weaving—and studies of accretive natural phenomena, such as animal architecture, the growth of trees, or geological forces.

=== Sculpture ===
After moving to Chicago in 1987, Cooper began working with veneer scraps recycled from woodworking factories; the material connected her art to the greater ecological whole through a life cycle of extraction from nature, industrial processing and discard, and transformation into organic aesthetic forms. Her process involved methodically bending and layering the fragile veneer in loose, interlaced weaves that created undulating, penetrable skins or shell-like armor around hollow, biomorphic cores: cocoon, spiral, bulb, limb, vessel and nest forms.

Arts critic Kathryn Hixson described works such as the vertical, six-foot Voluta (1988) as amassing seemingly random, curvilinear layerings "to form strong unified objects, almost mathematical in their purity and stability," which hover on walls "like protective presences." Susan Snodgrass and Fred Camper wrote that works, such as the coiled, vortex-like Cyclus, cocoon-like Plexus or undulating, pod-like Ova (all 1994), simultaneously allude to anthropomorphic figures, ancient fertility statues and scientific proofs, blurring boundaries between the natural and cultural, romantic and rational.

In the late 1990s, critics identified a new intensity and frankness in Cooper's sculpture, which often features commanding, larger-than-human scaled tree-, column- or torso-like forms that express themes of vulnerability, healing, and ecological threat. Still influenced by natural building processes—the outward, ringed growth of trees, layering of cells in an embryo, bundling of fibers into muscle, or accretive forming of shells—this work incorporated new methods (dappled, fish-scale-like surfaces, visible drips of sap-like glue) and materials (junked automotive parts and cast steel) that conflate the organic and fabricated.

Barbara Cooper, Fall, wood and glue, floor section: 74" x 30" x 13", wall section: 85" x 30" x 18", 2004.

Works such as Columen (1998), Schist and Brace (both 2000) resemble limbless, fallen, split or cut trees with dripping glue suggesting the arrested vitality of a living thing. In others, like Mast (2000), Cooper uses veneer like sheaths or folds, alluding to wind-blown sails, clothing and the body, while other works reference the movement of water (rapids, waves) around obstacles; Fragment (1999) suggests a cache of coiled wood scrolls in a tree stump. Several works explore biological reactions such as burls or calluses in forms balanced between abstraction and natural references (hearts, limbs, bulbs); Burl (1997), Pomme (1998) and Corm (1999) incorporate a battered muffler layered with veneer, blackened steel sprouting vegetable roots, and bronze-like "tumors" that imply wounds, recuperation, and closure.

Residencies in Iceland in 2000 and 2003 took Cooper's work in a new direction, as she explored the fluid dynamics of geological forces such as lava flows and earthquakes. Surge (2002) is a fibrous, arched form that suggests vast, horizontal volcanic and glacial landscapes and the parallel forms of recorded injuries and change on bark. For Fall (2004), she translated a drawing into three dimensions, creating a seven-foot wood veneer wall sculpture whose free-form undulations spill another six feet onto the floor. That work led to a series of multi-sectioned sculptures cast in iron from clay slabs, in which she varied organic, terrain-like surfaces with smooth cut edges to suggest landscape tensions between nature and human development. The largest, Trace (2006), is a ten-foot work whose nine sections resemble slices of earth strata forced together, domino-like, by great pressure. In later sculpture, such as in the 2019 show, "Increment" (Ukrainian Institute of Modern Art), Cooper explored layered transformation, the intersection between natural and manufactured, and form as a record of development, repurposing veneer scraps and earlier sculpture fragments, often in intimate, highly tactile, smaller works.

=== Drawings ===
Throughout her career, Cooper has created and exhibited drawings that function as parallel works rather than studies, and reveal her sculpture's dependence on line, gesture and fluidity. Susan Snodgrass described her mid-1990s "Gyration" charcoal series, based on foliage in rural France, as "morphic bodies writhing through ambiguous backdrops" with a "commanding, yet lyrical physicality." The activated surfaces of drawn, smudged and erased lines in her "Flow" and "Currents" series were inspired by rushing or rippling water and California oak tree rings, while the "Processes of Change" series (influenced by her early-2000s experience in Iceland) explores geologic forces in 5' x 10' charcoal works. In later drawings, Cooper has sought to remove evidence of her hand in collage works that incorporate scanned and Photoshopped material or collected pressed leaves.

Barbara Cooper, Pneuma, wood and perforated stainless steel, 45’ x 13’ x 3’, 2019. ProMedica Hospital Generations Tower, Toledo, OH.

=== Public art and collaborations ===
Cooper has created several large-scale commissioned public works melding her sculptural concerns with qualities specific to their spaces. Current (2007, Chicago Public Library, Avalon Branch) is a 20-foot-long horizontal, suspended sculpture of layered, undulating wood forms that echo the layering of pages and collected books and suggest the ripple effect of learning on a community. Ecotone (2013, Florida Gulf Coast University Library) and Circuit (2015, Hinsdale Public Library) feature spiraling, wood-and-metal ribbon forms that reference, respectively, the overlapping of communities and habitats and the flows of technology, electronics, information and transportation. Pneuma (2019, Pro Medica Generations Tower, Toledo) uses similar means to embody connections and tensions between physical and spiritual and outer and inner, as well as the flow of elements and beings around obstacles during healing, transformation and growth.

For Transitions (2009, Chicago Transit Authority Paulina station), Cooper placed two components in dialogue: a suspended sculpture of swirling metal organic forms and a glass wall mosaic depicting intersecting, opposing sets of concentric circles; the forms reference burls, eddies in water and cell structure to represent the fluid energy of the city and its commuters, intersecting hubs and neighborhoods. The 82-foot mosaic Interval 2009, (T. F. Green Airport, Providence) features undulating blue forms suggesting the flow of a waterfall as a metaphor for the fluidity of movement and tensions associated with air travel and weather; Cooper based the hand-painted forms on collaged found photos of nature and the work's structure on the naturally occurring mathematical Fibonacci series.

In addition to her artwork, Cooper has created set designs for an Athenaeum Theatre (Chicago) production and a Hedwig Dances production, Dance of Forgotten Steps (2010). In 2013, she collaborated with choreographer Jan Bartoszek to create ASCENDance, a fifty-minute multimedia dance work that features dancers manipulating large, origami-based sculptural elements, an entirely new form for Cooper.

== Collections and recognition ==
Cooper's work is in many public and private art collections, including the Smithsonian American Art Museum, Museum of Contemporary Art Chicago, Long Beach Museum of Art, Bernheim Arboretum and Research Forest, Columbus Museum of Art, Contemporary Museum Honolulu, Cranbrook Art Museum, Illinois State Museum, Racine Art Museum, and Yellowstone Art Museum, among others.

Cooper has been recognized with grants from the National Endowment for the Arts (1994), Illinois Arts Council (three, 1988–2009) and City of Chicago (1991), and awarded artist residencies from the Wilderness Workshop, Bloedel Reserve, Museum of Copenhagen, Kohler Arts Center, Hafnarfjördur Centre, Camargo Foundation, MacDowell Colony, Ragdale, Montalvo Arts Center, and Yaddo, among others.
