= Opera in Focus =

William B. Fosser's puppet production Opera in Focus is a troupe which performs opera and musical theater with some of the world's most sophisticated puppets. The Opera in Focus puppet opera theater is located in Rolling Meadows, Illinois.

== History ==
Fosser, a puppeteer and artistic director of the legendary Kungsholm Miniature Opera in Chicago, began designing the puppets that would eventually be used in his Opera in Focus productions in the late 1930s. The cost involved in building each elaborately articulated puppet prevented him from constructing them until 1956. He presented the first Opera in Focus performances—by invitation only—in 1958 in a rented store on the north side of Chicago, where they were received with great enthusiasm.

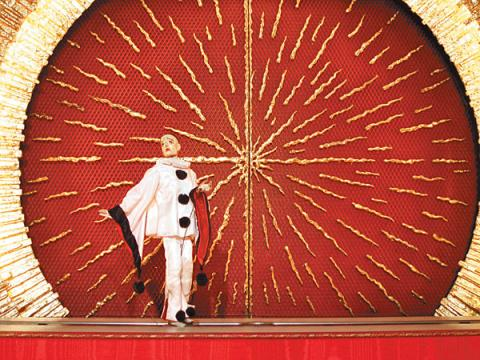
Pagliacci

In order to support the puppet opera, Fosser made a living as a set designer and art director in the motion picture industry, working on such films as Ordinary People, Home Alone, Backdraft, Weird Science, Music Box, Damien: Omen II, The Breakfast Club, A League of Their Own and Groundhog Day. He also worked as a set designer for live theatrical productions, designing scenery for the Lyric Opera of Chicago, as well as the Candlelight, Ivanhoe, and Drury Lane theaters. He spent his free time further developing and perfecting his puppets and the presentation of his elaborate miniature operatic productions. Due to the hectic nature of his career in the film industry, performances of Opera in Focus were infrequent, except for periods in 1962-1963 and 1978-1979 when Opera in Focus enjoyed residencies in Detroit and at the now-defunct Magic Pan restaurant in Chicago.

In 1993 the Rolling Meadows Chamber of Commerce offered Fosser a permanent home in Rolling Meadows, Illinois, where Opera in Focus has been performed weekly ever since.

William Fosser died of congestive heart failure and pneumonia on February 19, 2006, in Resurrection Hospital, in Chicago. He was buried at Queen of Heaven Cemetery in Hillside, Illinois.

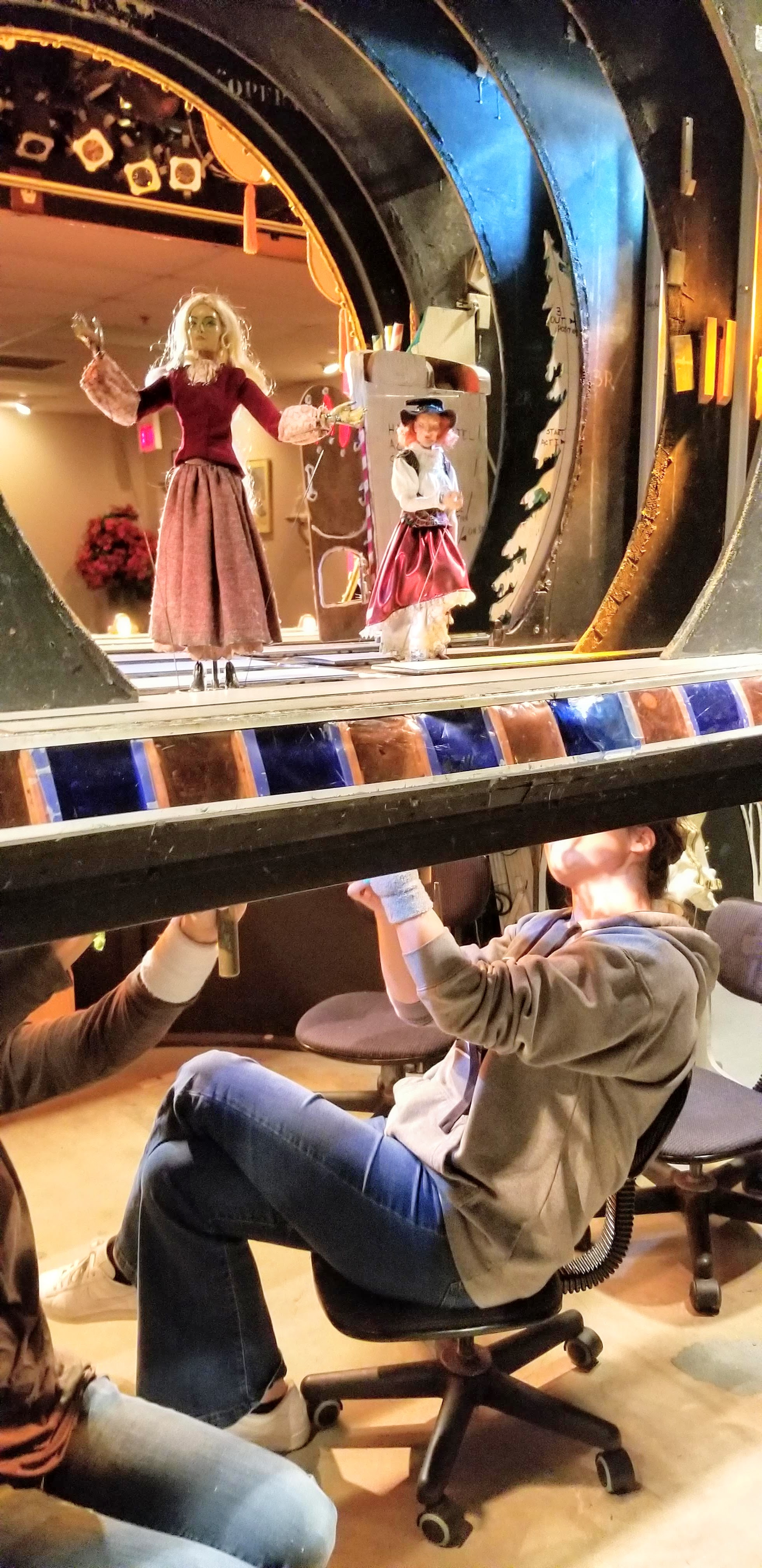
A behind-the-scenes view of the unique rod puppets being operated by puppeteers below the stage.

== See also ==
- Puppetry
- Opera
