= Marwen =

- Formation: 1987
- Type: Nonprofit after school creative youth development program
- Location: Chicago, IL
- Website: www.marwen.org

Marwen is a nonprofit organization that provides free arts education to Chicago students from under-resourced neighborhoods and schools. It began as a one-room art studio in 1987, and today serves close to 900 students a year through after-school and weekend arts programming. As of 2017, Marwen has served more than 10,000 students. Programs offered include free courses in painting, photography, graphic design, animation, fashion design, ceramics, and more. Ninety percent of Marwen students report coming from low-income families and nearly 40% of Marwen’s students are not taking art classes in school.

== Eligibility and demographics ==
Marwen's student base includes 6th–12th graders from 54 of Chicago's 57 ZIP Codes. In 2016, students reported coming from 297 different schools across the city and 39% of students were not taking art in their school. Students from under-resourced communities and schools are eligible for Marwen courses, and 90% of these students come from families who self-identify as low-income. In addition, 67% of students are female and 33% are male; 43% of students are Hispanic/Latino, 29% are Black/African-American, and 14% are Caucasian.

== Programming Areas ==
=== Studio Programs ===
"Beyond the Naked Eye" was a summer class co-developed as a partnership between the University of Chicago Materials Research Science and Engineering Center (MRSEC) and Marwen Foundation teaching artist Marta Garcia. The class brought 16 high school students from around the city of Chicago to MRSEC labs for two weeks in July 2013. The students built photographic sets in the studio and worked with instrumentation in the MRSEC shared microscopy facilities. They learned to use technical photography, high-speed imaging, optical microscopy, and electron microscopy.

=== College, career, and alumni programs ===
The College, Career, + Alumni office provided resources for students who are undocumented, studying art, or pursuing studies and work outside the arts. They also offer individual counseling, free workshops and events, commissioned projects, arts-related internships, and alumni opportunities.

Marwen's college preparation programs and courses allow students to explore art-centered career options in fields like architecture, film, and graphic design, visit college campuses across the United States, and get paid for their work through internships. While Marwen's goal is to shape the artistic abilities and outlets of current students who cannot afford alternative services, they also ensure their students' involvement in the arts beyond their high school careers. Marwen reports that 91% of their alumni attend college.

== Facility ==
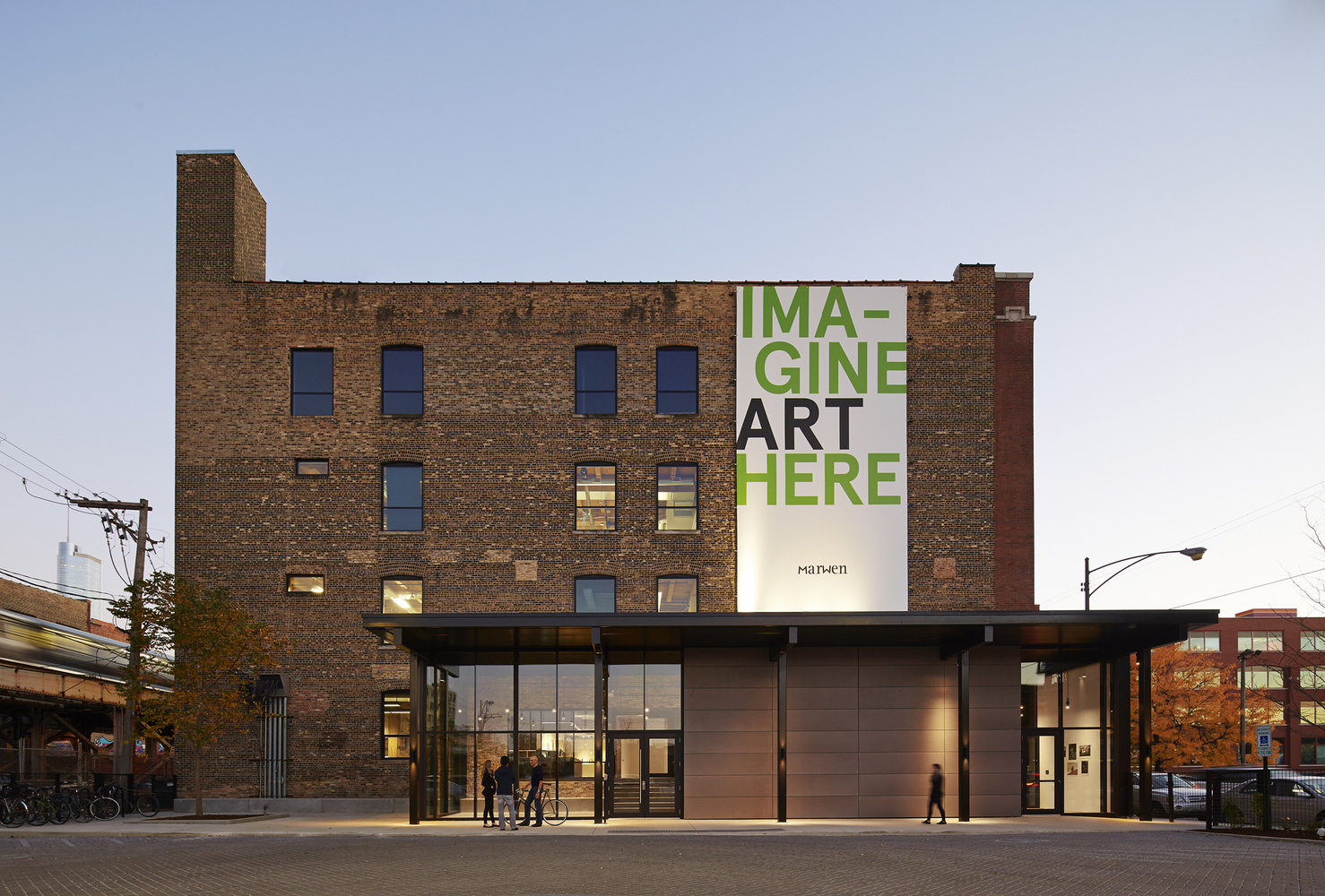
Marwen’s Building Expansion by Wheeler Kearns Architects

Marwen's programming takes place at Marwen, located in Chicago's River North neighborhood. The building is a newly renovated multi-floor, nine-studio, three-gallery industrial loft located at 833 N. Orleans Street in Chicago, Illinois.

Marwen purchased the building in 2012, which began a new period of construction led by an architecture team from Wheeler Kearns. The building renovations included adding new studios and galleries, a library, and administrative offices; Marwen also updated its state-of-the-art instructional studios and replaced the roof and all windows.

== Leadership ==
The President and CEO of Marwen is Antonia Contro. She has been a part of Marwen for 25 years and has served on Chicago mayor Rahm Emanuel's Cultural Advisory Council. Contro holds an MFA in painting from the University of Illinois at Chicago and a BA in art history, studio art, and Italian from Northwestern University. In 2002, she was awarded a Rockefeller fellowship, and in 2006, the ABBY Award for Arts Management Excellence.

Marwen's Board of Directors includes more than 40 trustees, including James Hill III, Marcy Carlin, Rich Stoddart, Michael Fassnacht, and Molly Limmer.

== Funding ==
For the fiscal year of 2016, Marwen received $592,640 in fundraising, $60,565 in government grants, $1,475,072 in other contributions not included on the tax form, and $320,545 in non-cash contribution. Marwen received a total of $2,128,277 in revenue for the year of 2016.

Past grant donors have included the Lloyd A. Fry Foundation, the Mayer & Morris Kaplan Family Foundation, the Surdna Foundation, the Terra Foundation, the Chicago Community Trust, and the Illinois Arts Council Agency. In 2017, Marwen received the REAM Foundation Impact Grant and was given a $300,000 grant from the MacArthur Foundation. Marwen includes annual reports on their website that detail funding sources.

Marwen's largest fundraising event is their annual Paintbrush Ball. A highlight of the gala is that it provides an opportunity for donors to interact directly with Marwen students. Recently, each year's event has had over 400 attendees. The gala features live music, food, and a silent auction. In 2017, Marwen raised $900,000 for their programs.

Each November, Marwen hosts an event called Art Fair, where the public can purchase artwork by Marwen students, staff, and teaching artists. The event, hosted annually in Marwen's River North building, is an important source of revenue for the organization.

== Awards ==
To recognize Marwen for its creative development of Chicago youth, Marwen was awarded the Coming Up Taller Award by the National Arts and Humanities Youth Program Awards. In addition, after Marwen's 2015 renovations, the organization's architecture was bestowed three awards: the American Association of Architecture's Design Excellence Award, the Building Design + Construction Magazine's Silver Award, and the 2016 Social Economic Environmental Design (SEED) Award for Excellence in Public Interest Design.
