= DuPage Opera Theatre =

The DuPage Opera Theatre (DOT) is one of three professional opera companies located in the Chicago area, along with the Lyric Opera of Chicago and the Chicago Opera Theater. Founded in 1977 as a resident, professional ensemble at the McAninch Arts Center at the College of DuPage in Glen Ellyn, Illinois, DuPage Opera has mounted several hundred performances since its inception.

DuPage Opera Theatre performs in the 793-seat main stage of the Arts Center. The Arts Center opened on October 10, 1986, and 12 years later was renamed the Harold D. McAninch Arts Center. The MAC, as it is commonly referred to, is home to three resident professional ensembles: Buffalo Theatre Ensemble, DuPage Opera Theatre, and New Philharmonic, as well as the Gahlberg Gallery, a space for visual art exhibition.

Harold Bauer was the founding artistic director and conductor of the company. Kirk Muspratt is the current artistic director and music director, a position that he has held since July 2004. In December 2006, Muspratt was named "Chicagoan of the Year" in classical music by John von Rhein and the staff of the Chicago Tribune. In his first four seasons, productions at the DuPage Opera Theatre featured Le nozze di Figaro, Il barbiere di Siviglia, La bohème, Faust, Otello and Tosca. In 2008, Muspratt stated that by tackling such renowned operas as Otello, "we are showcasing DuPage Opera's growth and new vision".

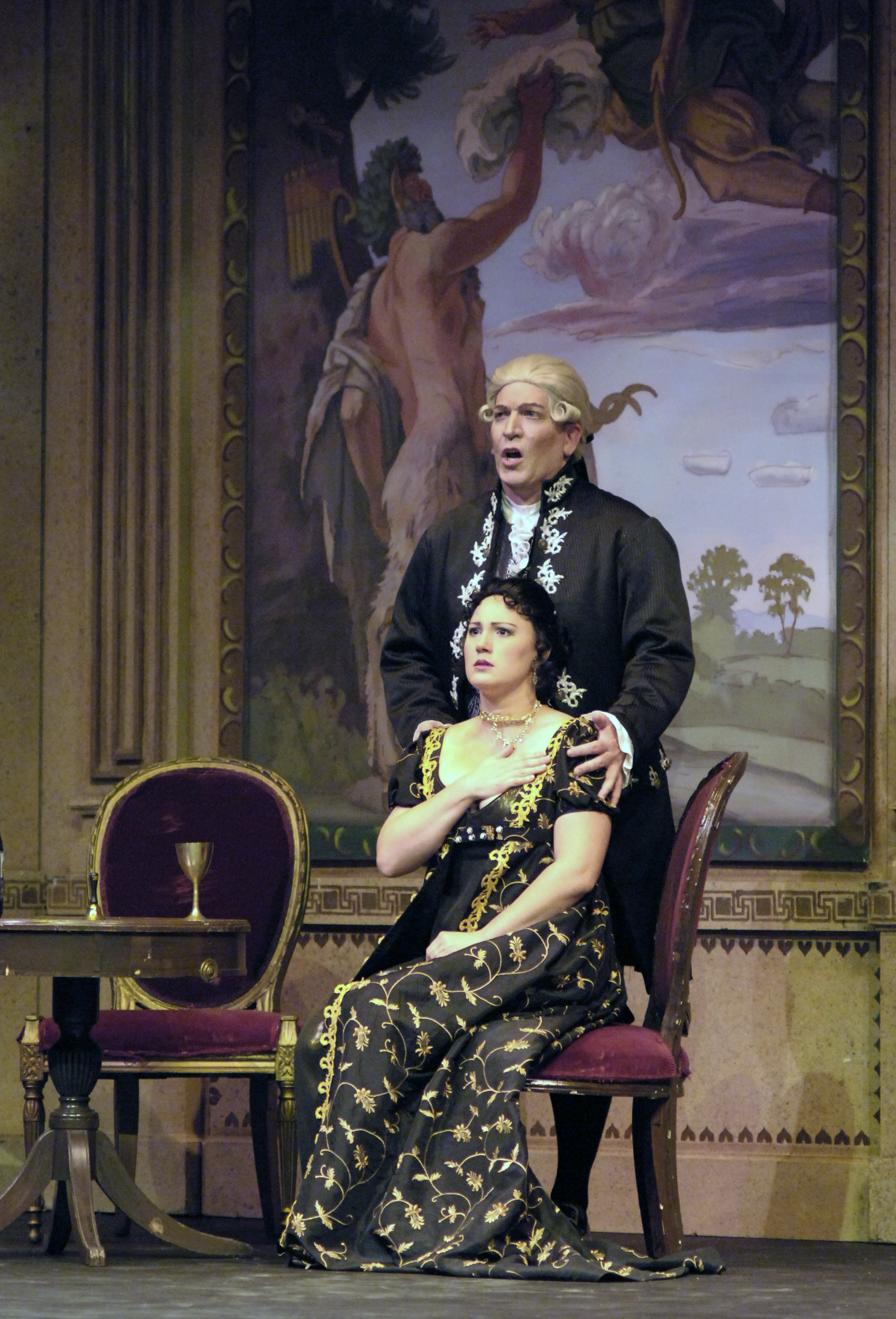
DuPage Opera Theatre production of Tosca

DOT's productions of the last 20 years include:

- Così fan tutte (1991)
- The Barber of Seville (1993, 2005)
- Jenůfa (1994)
- Don Pasquale (1994)
- Die Fledermaus (1995)
- Amahl and the Night Visitors (1995, 2003)
- Lazarus by (1996)
- La rondine (1996)
- The Marriage of Figaro (1997, 2004)
- The Elixir of Love (1997, 2009)
- Abduction from the Seraglio (1998)
- Carmen (1998, 2006)
- The Merry Widow (1999)
- La bohème (1999, 2007)
- Fidelio (2000)
- The Merry Wives of Windsor (2000)
- Werther (2001)
- The Magic Flute (2001)
- Tosca (2002, 2008)
- Susannah (2002)
- Don Giovanni (2003)
- La traviata (2004)
- Faust (2005)
- Hansel and Gretel (2007)
- Otello (2008)
- The Beggar's Opera (2009)
- Turandot (2010)
- Gianni Schicchi (2011)

== Gallery ==
DuPage Opera Theatre productions

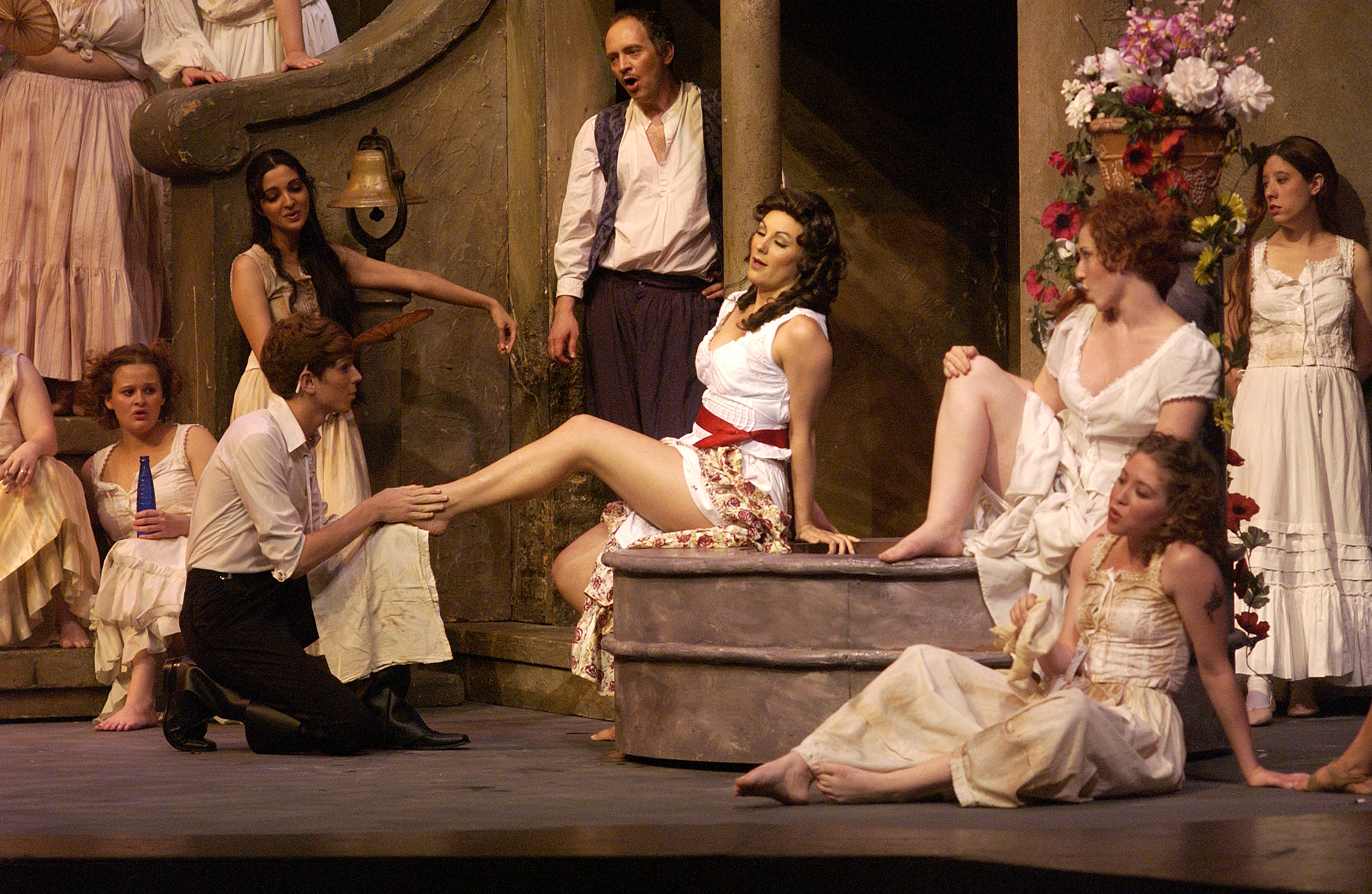
Carmen

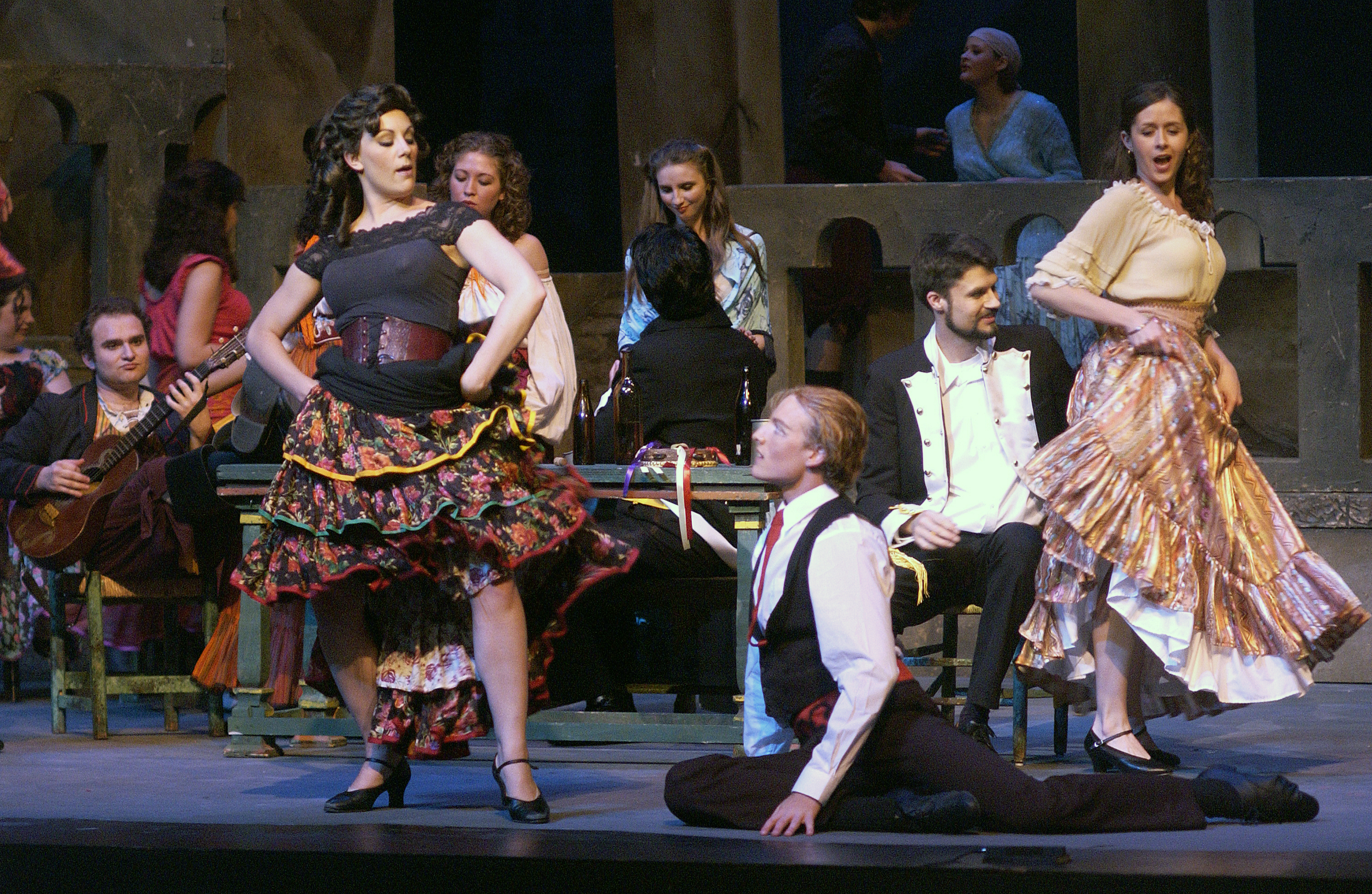
Carmen

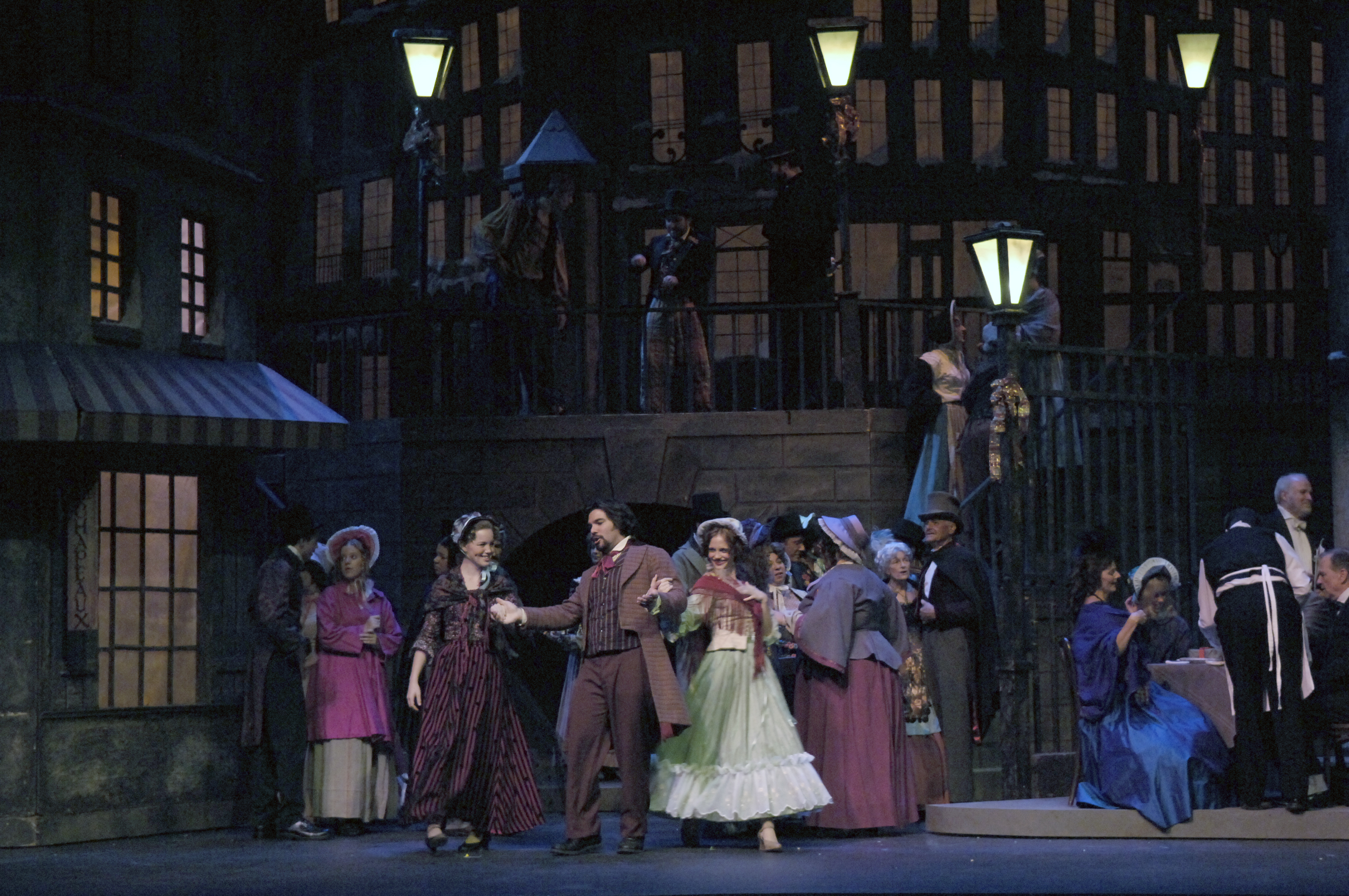
La bohème

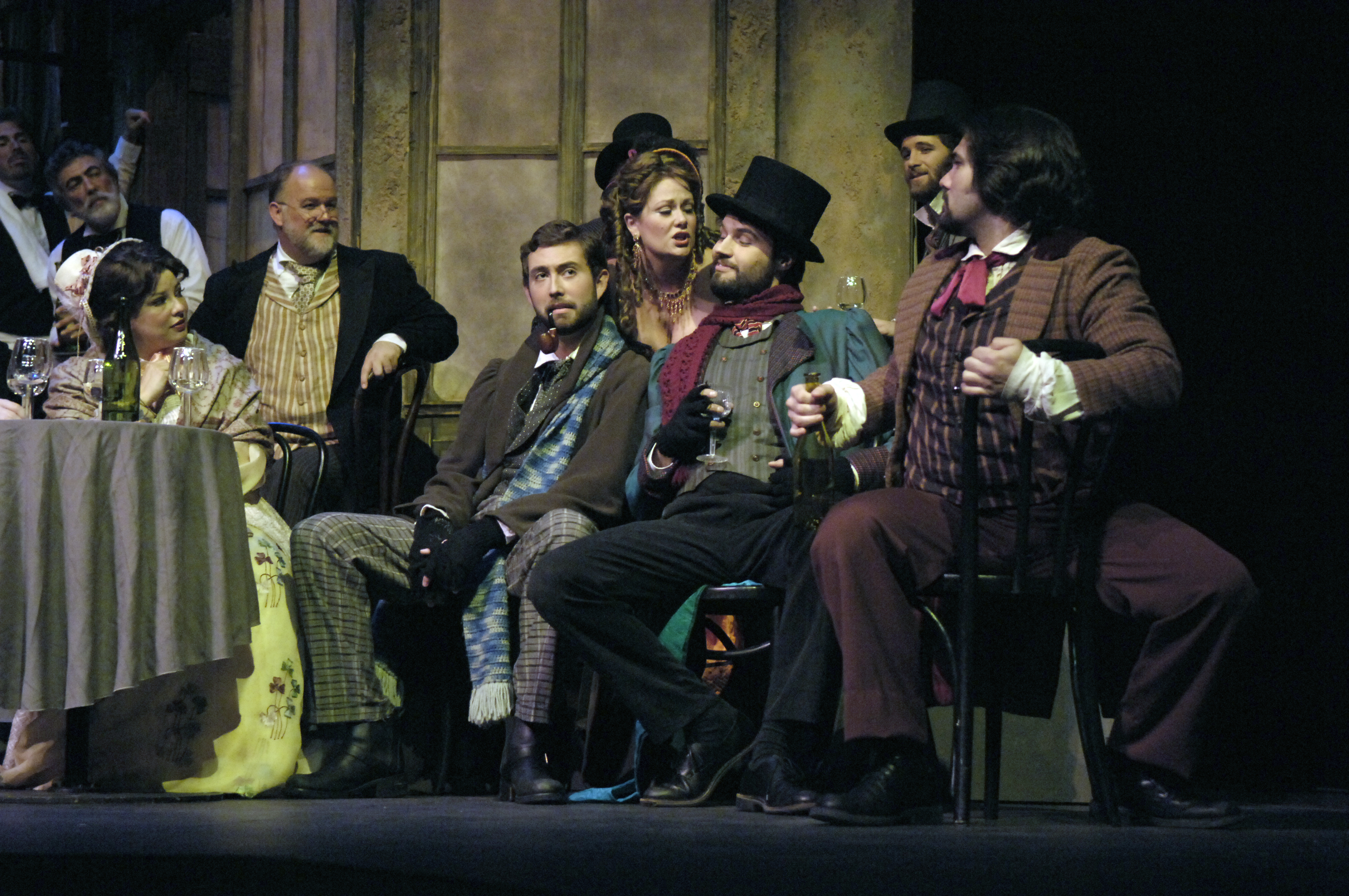
La bohème

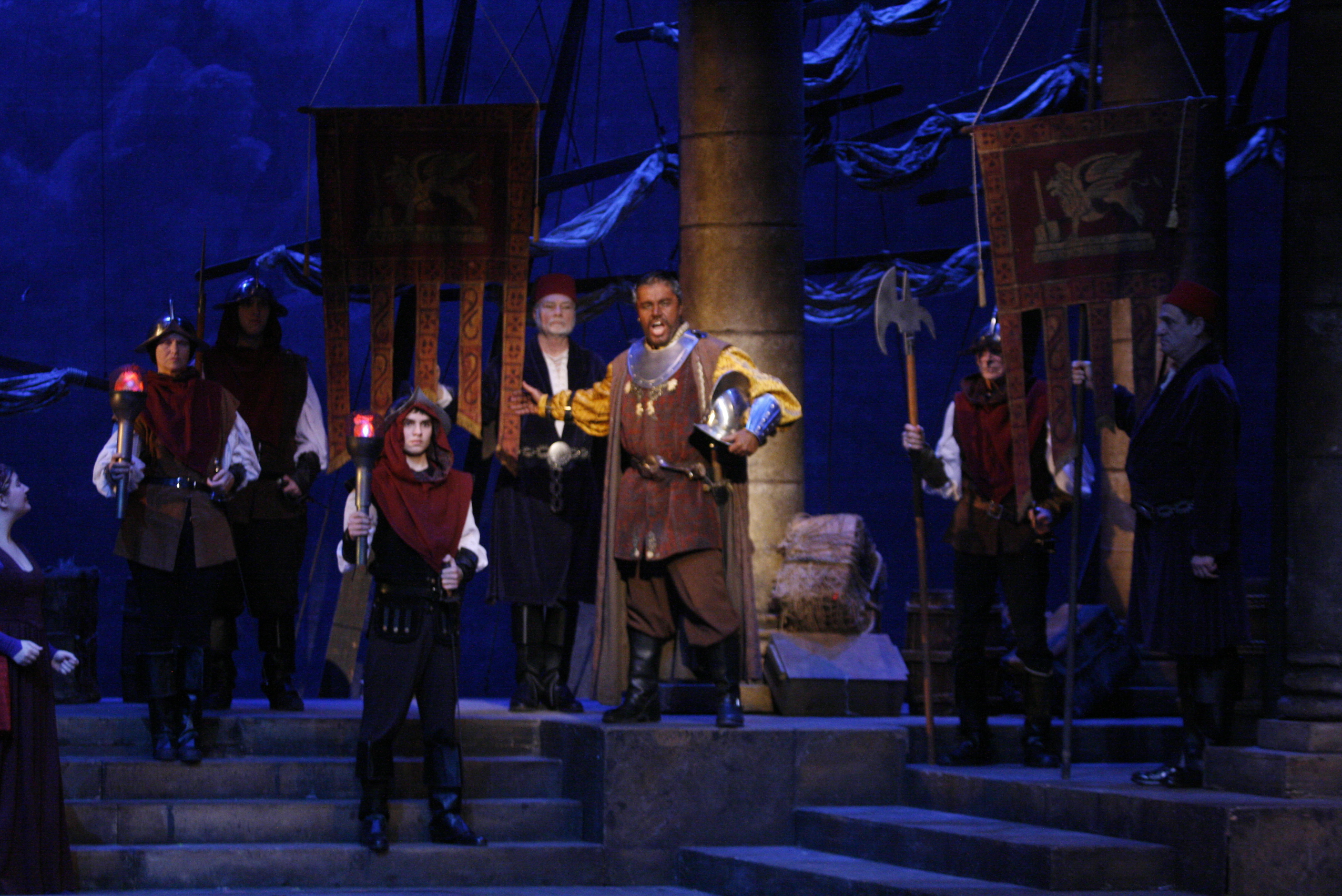
Otello

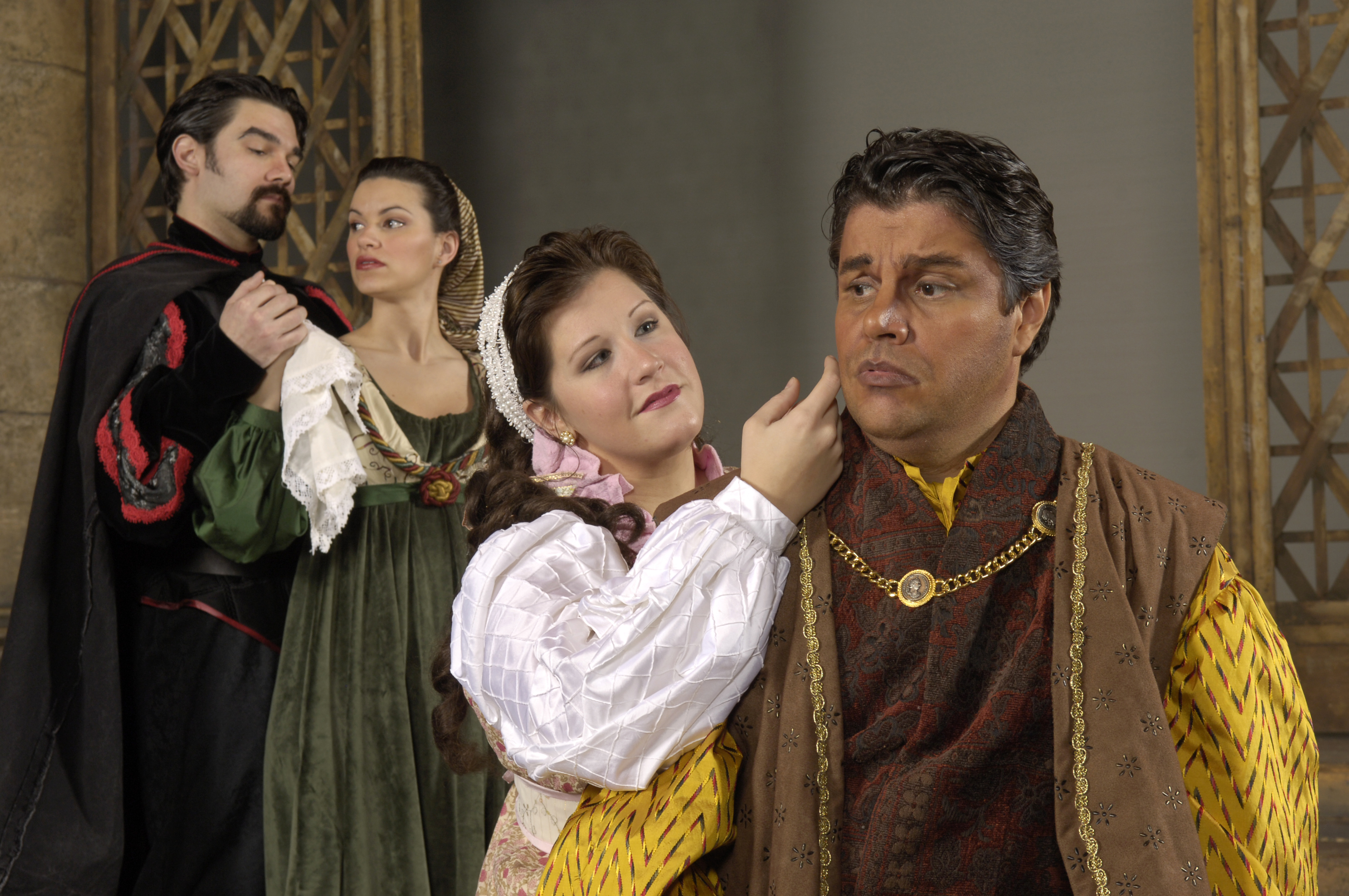
Otello

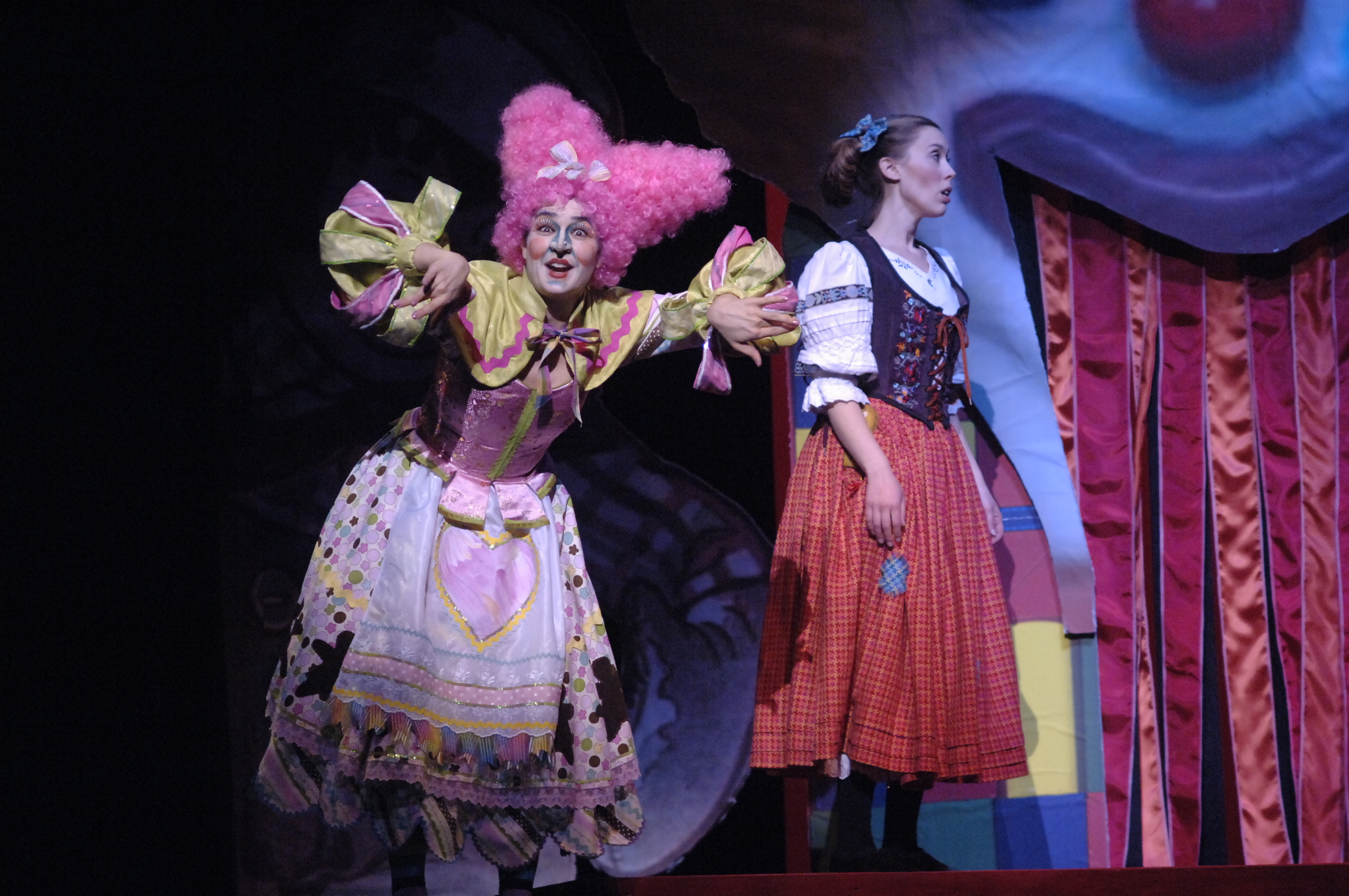
Hansel and Gretel

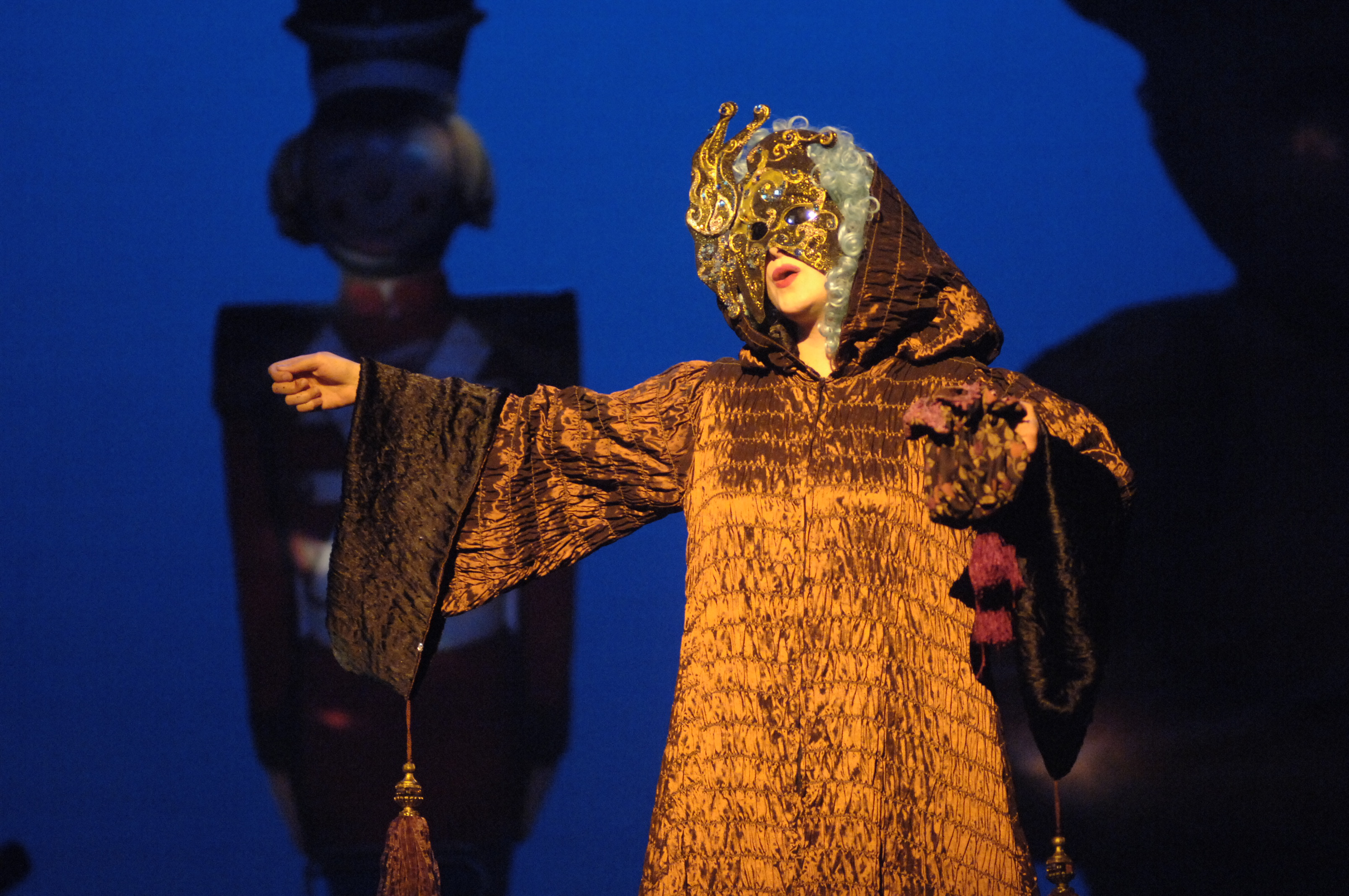
Hansel and Gretel

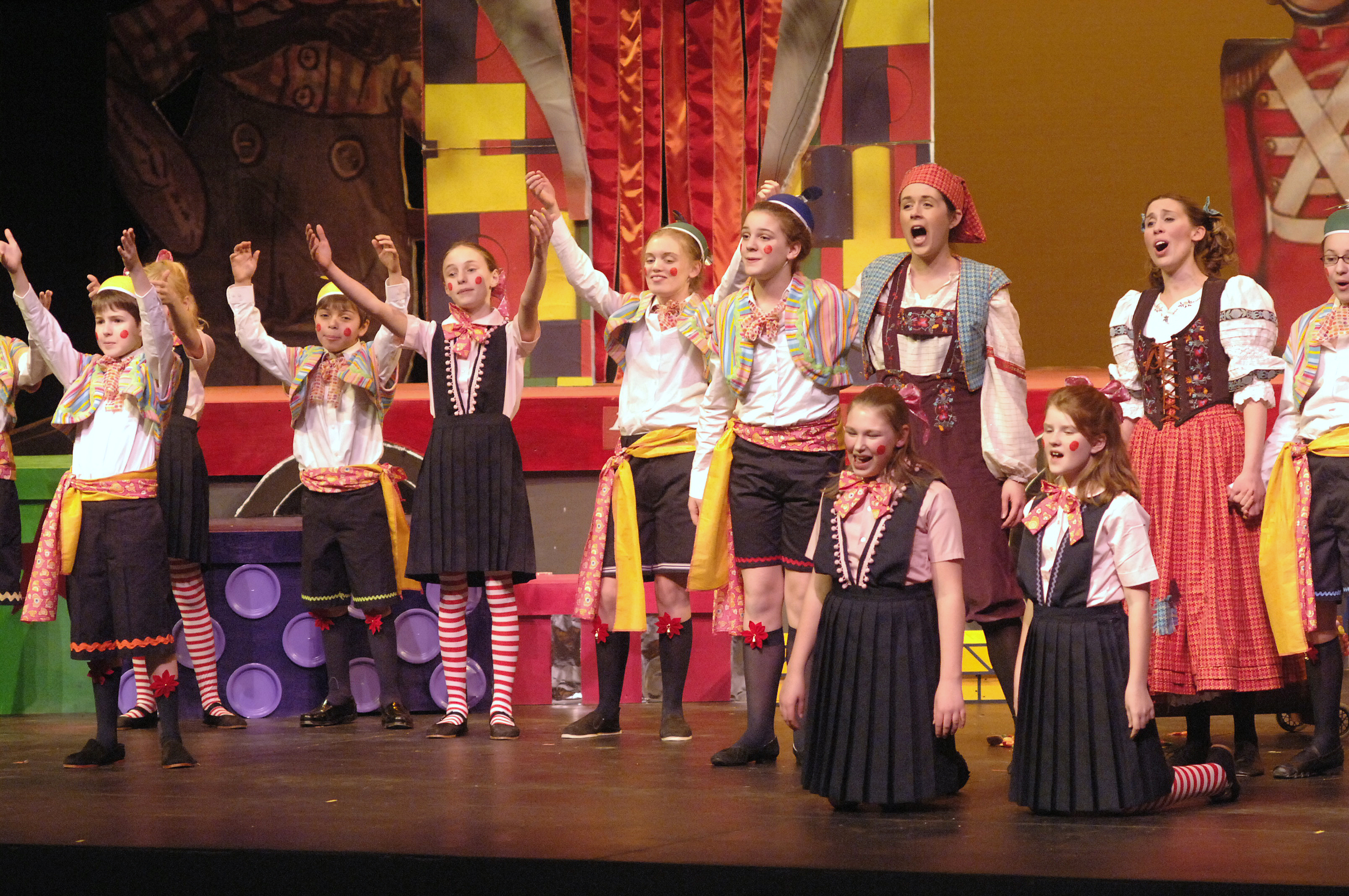
Hansel and Gretel

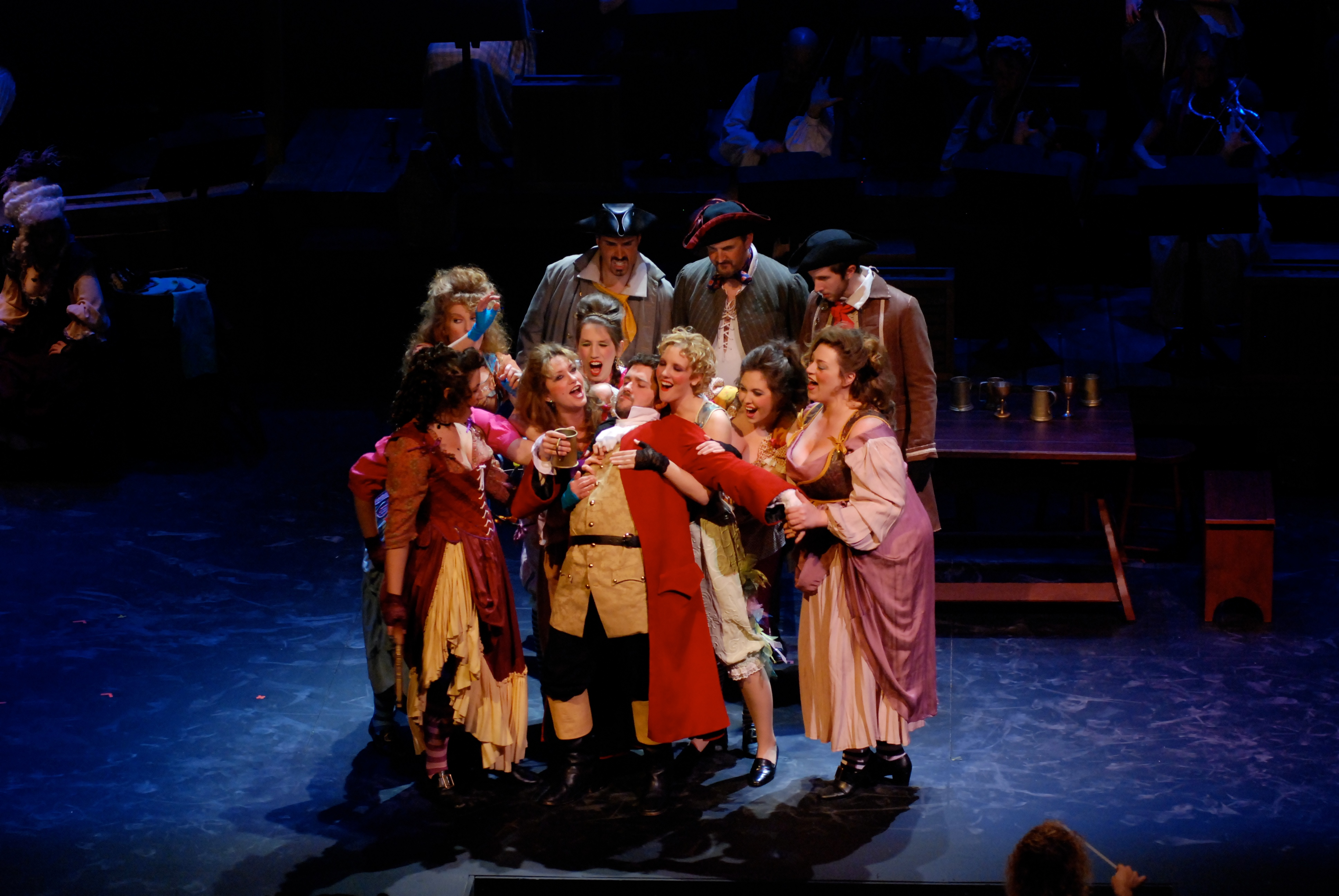
The Beggar's Opera

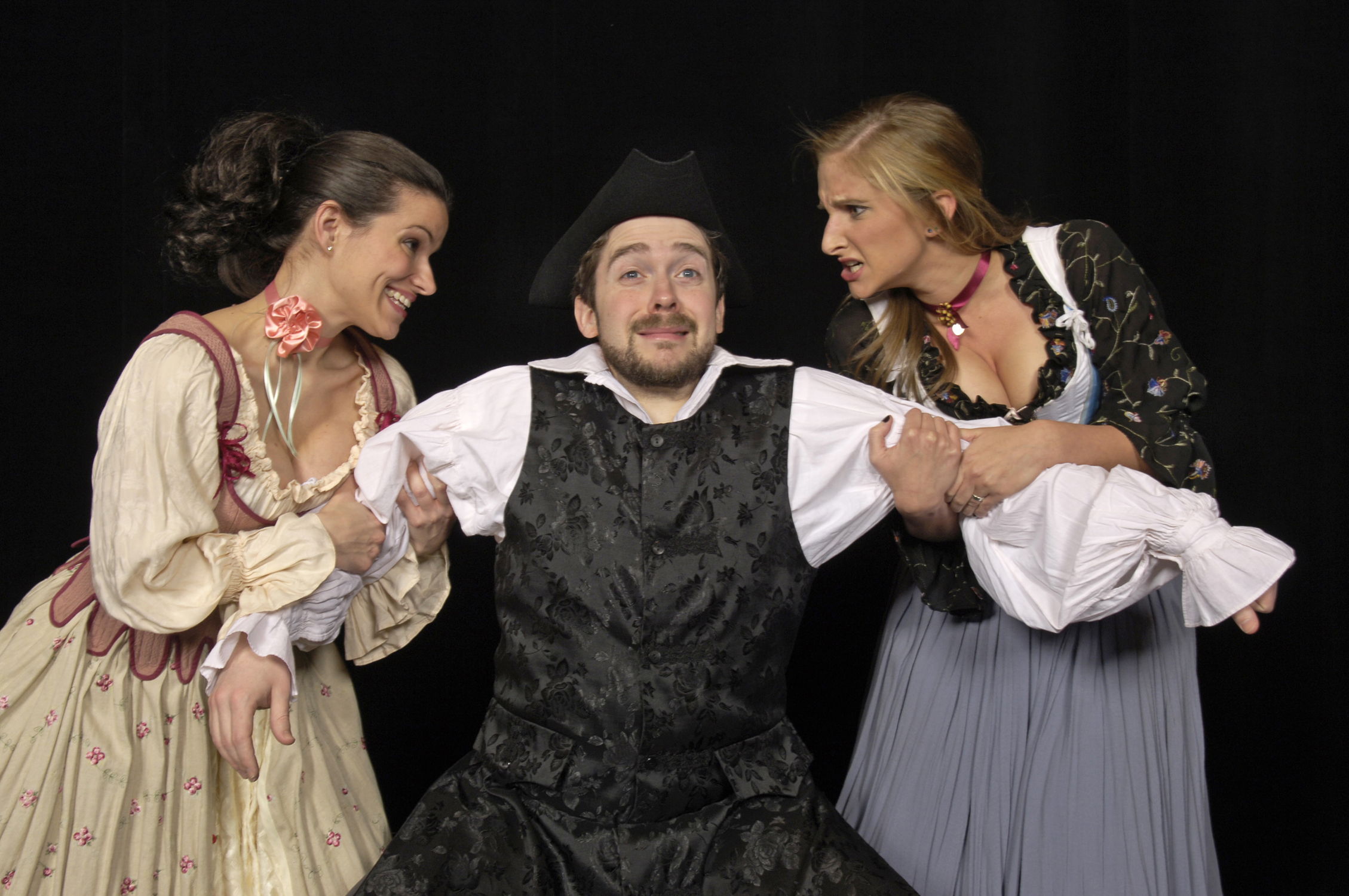
The Beggar's Opera

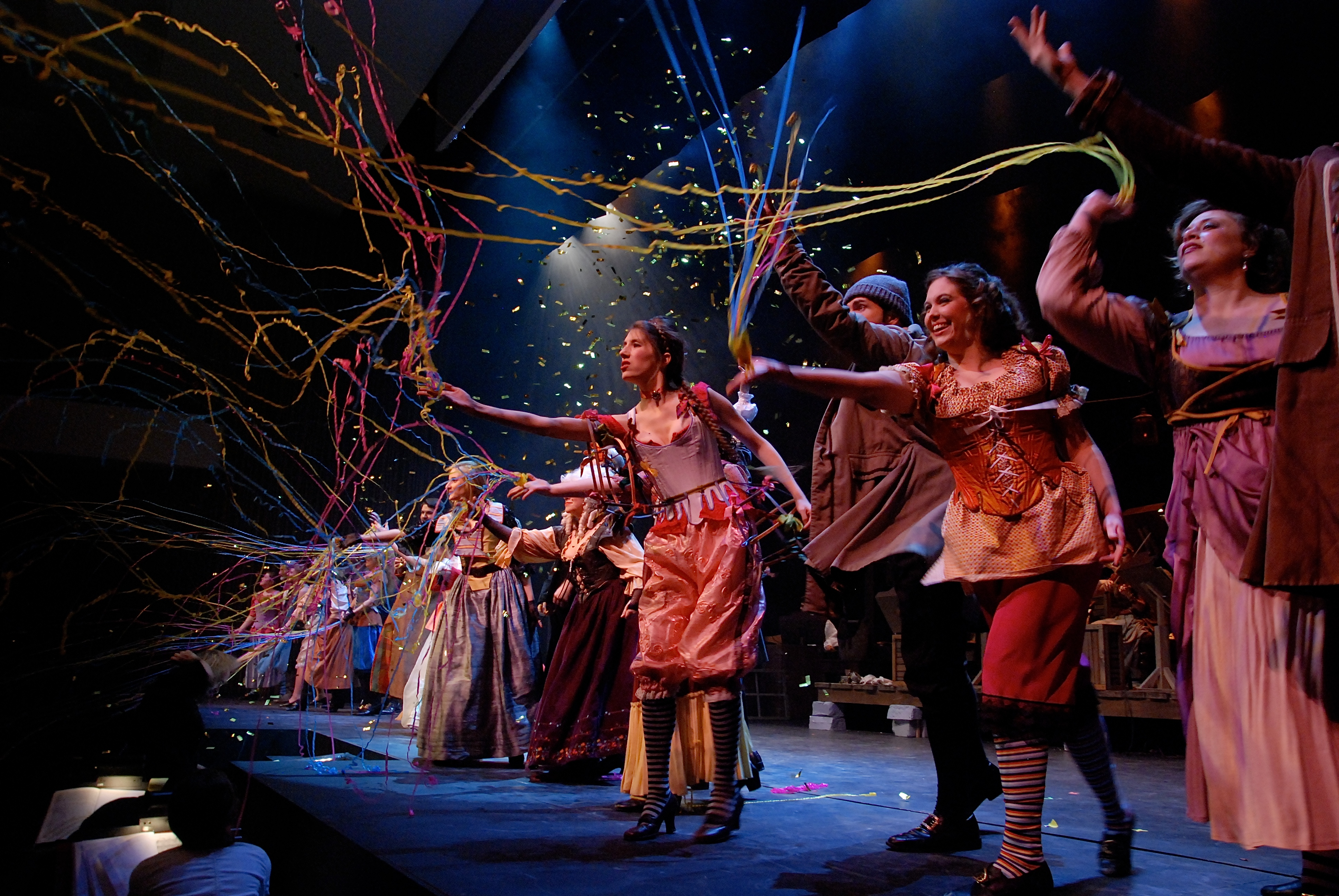
The Beggar's Opera

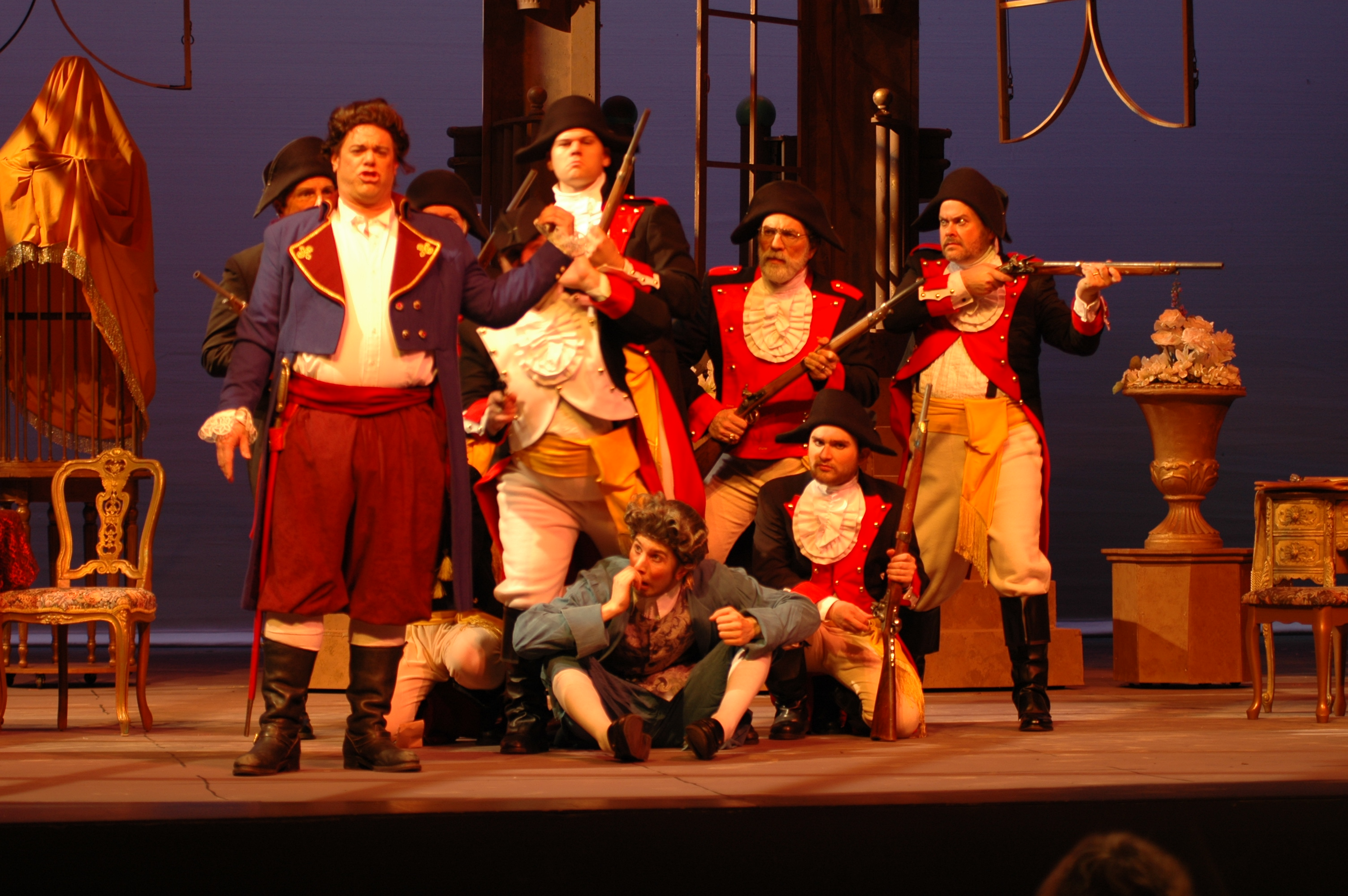
The Barber of Seville

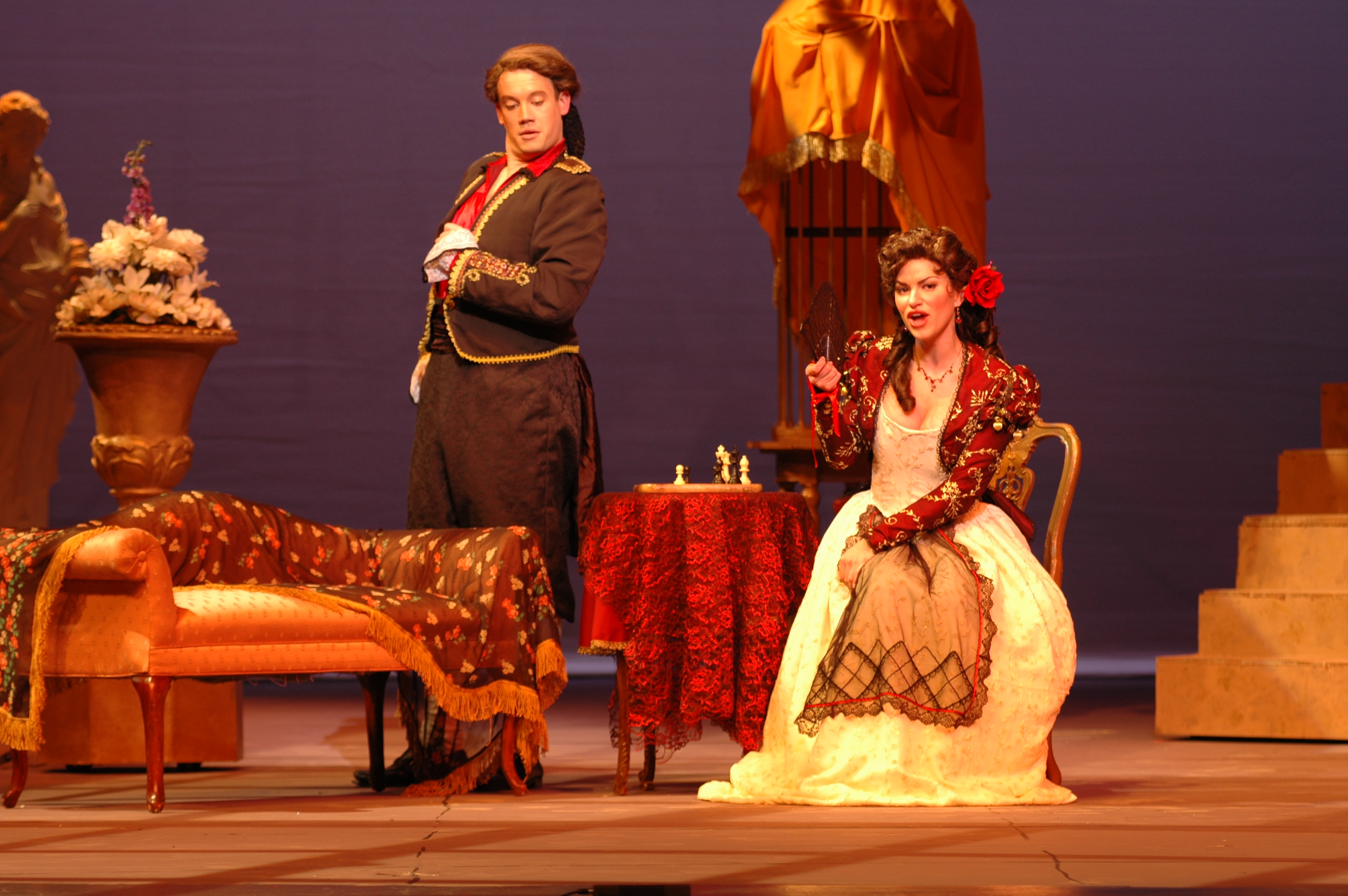
The Barber of Seville

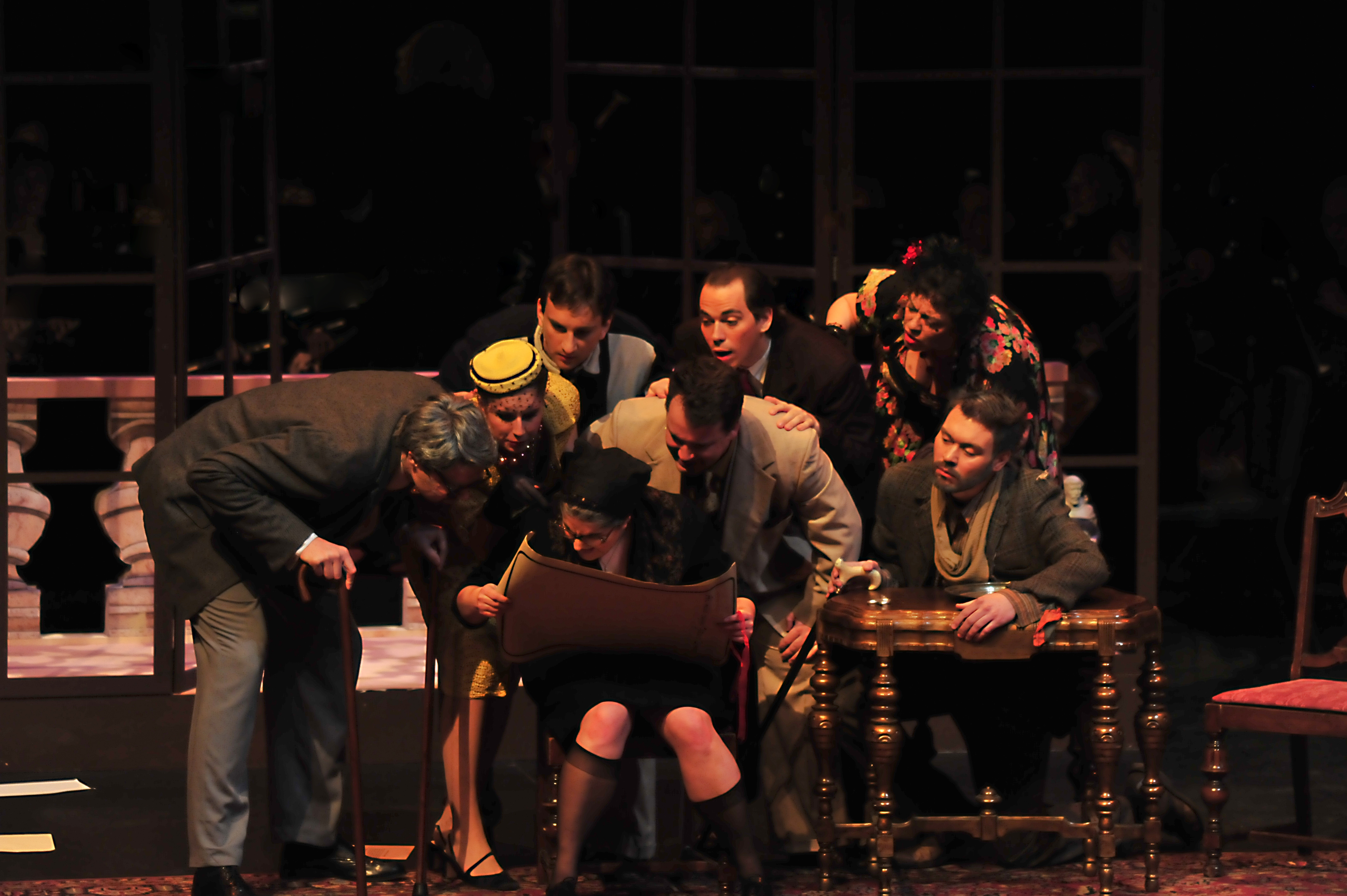
Gianni Schicchi

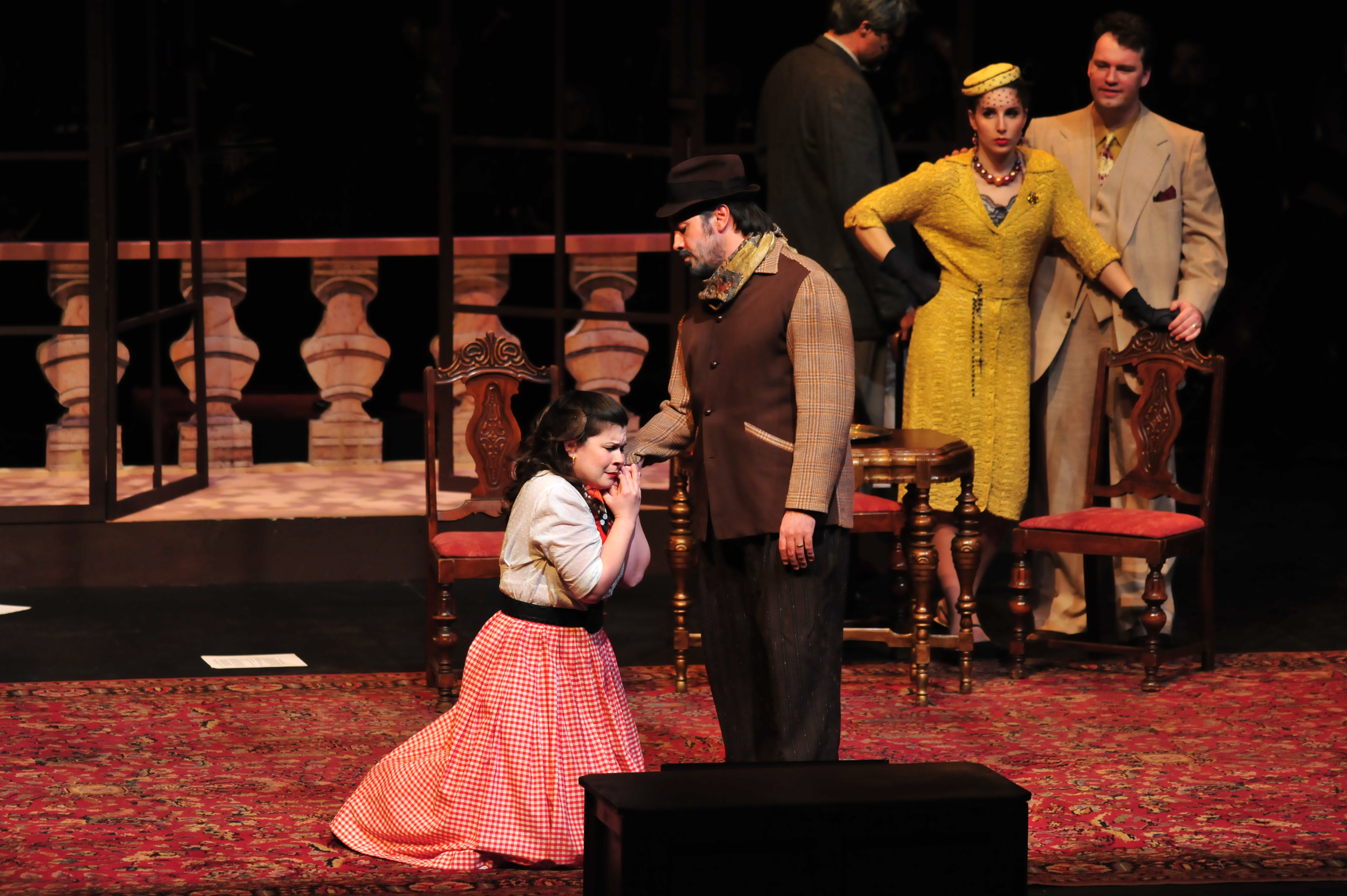
Gianni Schicchi
