= Vegan Museum =

US nonprofit travelling exhibition

The Vegan Museum
- Formation: 2016
- Tax ID no.: 32-0026361
- Headquarters: Chicago
- Revenue: $25,000 USD (2019)
- Website: veganmuseum.org

The Vegan Museum (formerly the National Vegetarian Museum) is a nonprofit travelling exhibition about veganism and vegetarianism. The exhibition tours different locations in and around Chicago. The Vegan Museum documents the history of the vegan and vegetarian movement in the United States.

== History ==
The museum was founded in 2017 as the National Vegetarian Museum and showed its first exhibition the same year. The museum was founded by Kay Stepkin, a former vegetarian restaurant owner who wrote a column about vegan food called "The Veggie Cook" for the Chicago Tribune from 2011 to 2015.

In 2020, the museum's board changed its name to The Vegan Museum. That same year the museum added an advisory council of influential vegans who include Neal Barnard, MD, president and founder of the Physicians Committee for Responsible Medicine, Anne Dinshah, vice president of the American Vegan Society, and Seth Tibbott, founder of Tofurky.

In 2022, the museum released a free historical research guide for historians, professors, students, and academics. Museum founder Kay Stepkin said the history of American vegetarianism was "underexplored" and that the first book about American vegetarian history was written only in 2004, even though American vegetarian history predates the War of American Independence. The museum created the guide with the aim of increasing American vegetarian history scholarship.

== Collection ==
The Vegan Museum documents the history of the vegan and vegetarian movement in the United States. The current exhibit is called "What Does It Mean to Be Vegetarian?” The exhibit consists of 12 seven-by-three-foot panels. The exhibition covers factory farms, Pythagoras, Leonardo da Vinci, comedian Dick Gregory, the history of the Chicago Vegetarian Society, the Pure Food Lunch Room (Chicago's first vegetarian restaurant, established in 1900), and the Vegetarian Times, magazine.

Stepkin has amassed a collection of vegan and vegetarian memorabilia, cookbooks, leaflets, and newsletters in her Lincoln Park apartment in Chicago.

== See also ==
- History of vegetarianism
- Veganism §History
