= Chicago Sports Museum =

Museum in Chicago

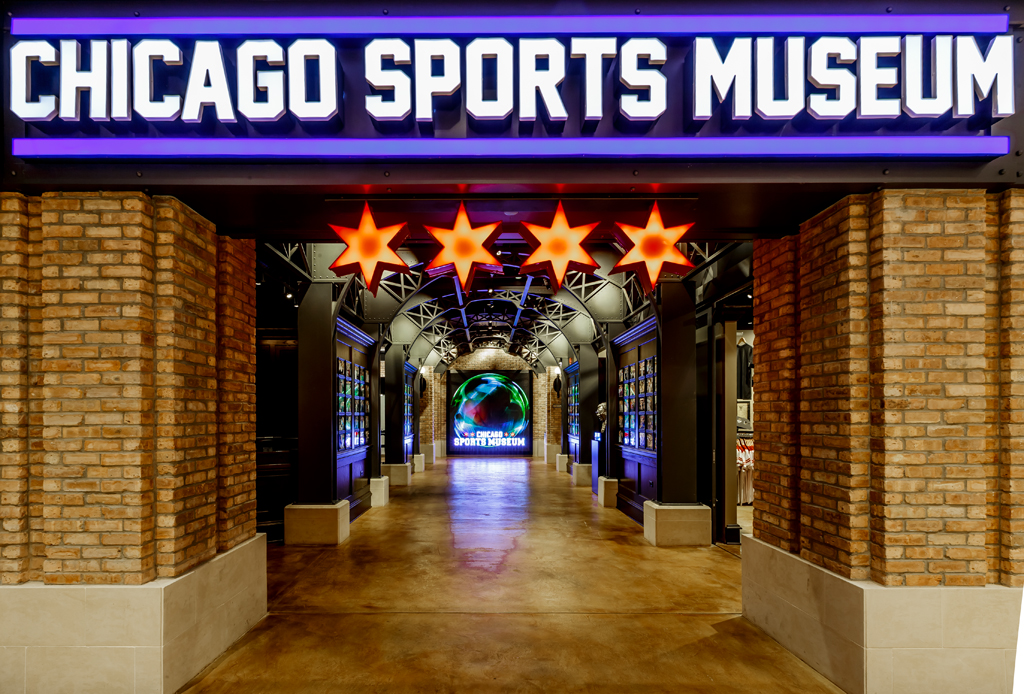
The entrance for the Chicago Sports Museum in 2014

The Chicago Sports Museum is a 23,000-square-foot museum located along the Magnificent Mile at the Water Tower Place mall in Chicago. The museum, which was opened on April 1, 2014—by Harry Caray's Restaurant Group and CEO Grant DePorter—features interactive skill challenges, unique sports memorabilia, and a collection of game-used artifacts well known to fans of Chicago sports.
