= ABA Museum of Law =

Founded in 1996 in Chicago, America Headquarters: Illinois, United States

- Established: 1996
- Dissolved: 2011
- Location: 321 North Clark Street, Chicago, Illinois United States
- Coordinates: 41.8882°N 87.6306°W
- Website: ABA Museum of Law

The ABA Museum of Law, opened in November 1996 in Chicago, Illinois by the American Bar Association, was the only national museum that focuses on the role of law and the legal profession in America and throughout the world. Its goal was to engage the public in the legal system and make it relevant in their lives. In an effort to increase understanding of lawyers and the work they do, the museum highlighted lawyers who were well known for other work as well as well-known trials.

The museum closed in late 2011, reportedly as a cost-cutting measure.
