= Hedwig Dances =

Hedwig Dances is an American contemporary dance company based in Chicago. Hedwig Dances was founded by Jan Bartoszek in 1985 and continues under her artistic direction. Hedwig Dances works to combine the interdisciplinary arts of sculpture, video, and original music with dance to create an integrated performance experience. The company is named after Bartoszek's paternal grandmother.

From 1992 to 2011, Hedwig Dances was the company-in-residence at The Chicago Cultural Center. Under the current commissioner of cultural affairs at that time, Lois Weisberg, Hedwig Dances offered community events such as performances, dance classes, workshops, and choreography labs to aspiring dancers and the Chicago population.

Hedwig Dances choreography has included guest artists such as Susan Marshall, Andrea Miller, Bill Young & Colleen Thomas, Judith Sanchez Ruiz, Beverly Blossom, Marianela Boan, Jan Erkert, Charlie Vernon and Renee Wadleigh. The company has toured nationally to New York, Virginia, Wisconsin, & Missouri and internationally to Honduras, Canada and Cuba.

The 2015 season marks Hedwig Dances' 30th anniversary.

== Dancers ==
Victor Alexander

Odbayar Batsuuri

Edson Cabrera

Sarah Carusona

Jessie Gutierrez

Maray Gutierrez

Molly Ross
