= WJLI =

- Metropolis, Illinois; United States
- Broadcast area: Paducah, Kentucky
- Frequency: 98.3 MHz
- Branding: Rock 98.3

Programming
- Format: Classic rock

Ownership
- Owner: Sun Media, Inc.
- Sister stations: WRIK, WIBV, WKRO, KLUE, KZMA

History
- First air date: 1984 (as WRIK)
- Former call signs: WRIK (1982–1987); WRIK-FM (1987–2012)

Technical information
- Licensing authority: FCC
- Facility ID: 63817
- Class: C1
- ERP: 100,000 watts
- HAAT: 213 meters (699 ft)
- Transmitter coordinates: 36°45′09″N 88°29′58″W

Links
- Public license information: Public file; LMS
- Webcast: Listen live
- Website: rock983.com

WJLI (98.3 FM, "Rock 98.3") is a radio station broadcasting a classic rock format. Licensed to Metropolis, Illinois, United States, the station is currently owned by Sun Media, Inc., also known as Stratemeyer Media and is located inside Kentucky Oaks Mall in Paducah, KY.

== History ==
The station was assigned the call sign WRIK on April 6, 1982. On October 6, 1987 the call sign was altered to WRIK-FM. The station was previously broadcast from the old Massac Theatre in Metropolis, Illinois. WRIK initially was a "class A" station with a signal covering Paducah, Kentucky and Metropolis, Illinois primarily. WRIK was extended a construction permit to move its transmitter location to the south and expand its signal coverage with a "class C1" license in the early 1990s. The station currently serves portions of Southern Illinois, Western Kentucky, Southeast Missouri and West Tennessee from a tower located in Graves County, Kentucky near the community of Golo.

On December 26, 2012 WRIK-FM rebranded as "Jelli 98.3", keeping its hot AC format, and changed its call sign to the current WJLI, and added 6 hours of user-controlled content per day, from 6PM-12M 7 days a week.

On November 6, 2013 WJLI changed their format to classic rock (keeping the "Jelli 98.3" branding), filling the classic rock void in the Paducah KY market 5 days after WQQR 94.7 FM began stunting with Christmas music. The first song played was Europe's "The Final Countdown".

On June 26, 2014 following Jelli's radio closure announcement, WJLI rebranded as "Rock 98.3".

== Previous logos ==
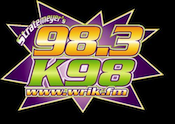
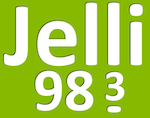
