= WKRO (AM) =

Radio station in Cairo, Illinois

- Cairo, Illinois; United States
- Broadcast area: Alexander County, Illinois and Bird's Point, Missouri
- Frequency: 1490 kHz
- Branding: Rock 98.3, WJLI (rebroadcasts WJLI)

Programming
- Format: Classic Rock

Ownership
- Owner: Benjamin Stratemeyer
- Sister stations: WRIK, WIBV, WJLI, KLUE, KZMA

History
- First air date: February 1942
- Call sign meaning: Cairo

Technical information
- Licensing authority: FCC
- Facility ID: 57415
- Class: C
- Power: 1,000 watts unlimited
- Transmitter coordinates: 37°2′36″N 89°11′2″W

Links
- Public license information: Public file; LMS

WKRO (1490 kHz) is an AM radio station located in Cairo, Illinois. As of May 2026, the station is silent.

== History ==
WKRO was assigned the AM frequency of 1490 kilocycles by the Federal Communications Commission in late 1941 and began broadcasting with a power of 250 watts in February 1942. According to Broadcasting Yearbook, the station raised its daytime power to 1,000 watts around 1975. The original station owner was Oscar Hirsch. Hirsch had previously started KFVS Radio in Cape Girardeau in the 1920s and expanded his broadcast group in the 1940s to also include radio stations in Sparta, Illinois (WHCO), Flat River, Missouri (KFMO) and Sikeston, Missouri (KSIM). By the mid-1950s, Hirsch expanded into the fledgling television industry with the formation of KFVS-TV in Cape Girardeau, Missouri. The Hirsch family operated WKRO until 1984, when the station was sold to a local funeral director, William T. "Bill" Crain. Crain operated WKRO for close to ten years. During the 1990s, WKRO was owned and operated by a succession of short-lived owners, including Roger Price, Sr. and Dan Moeller. Eventually, in an unusual arrangement for a commercial broadcast license, the station was briefly operated by Alexander County and overseen by the county commissioners before the final license holder, Stratemeyer Media, based in nearby Metropolis, Illinois, took over operations and programming of the station.

For much of its existence, WKRO broadcast a "block format" featuring different genres of music throughout the day and evening – such as country, adult contemporary and urban – interspersed with frequent news and information segments. The most notable were the longstanding "10 O'Clock Local News", broadcast every morning at 10:00 a.m.; "In Memoriam", a daily report of local obituaries; "Moments with the Master", a daily devotional with local pastor Dr. Larry Potts; and, "The Ilmoky Phone Quiz", a daily quiz show where listeners were called at random and asked to answer a trivia question for cash prizes. WKRO was a longtime affiliate of the St. Louis Cardinals Radio Network and broadcast an extensive schedule of local high school football and basketball games each season. Memorable announcers on WKRO include Danny Mac, Bob Stout, Harry Stout, Charles Walker, Delores Kerricker, John Jones, Tyrone Coleman, I.J. Hudson III, Derrick Hill, Owen Evers, Merrill C. "Red" Currier, Walter "Wally" McCowen, and Oklahoma Radio Personality of the Year (OAB) RJ Price.
