= WMJL =

WMJL can refer to:

- WMJL (AM), a radio station (1500 AM) licensed to Marion, Kentucky, United States
- WMJL-FM, a radio station (102.7 FM) licensed to Marion, Kentucky, United States
