= WMJL-FM =

- Marion, Kentucky; United States
- Frequency: 102.7 MHz
- Branding: River Country 102.7

Programming
- Format: Country

Ownership
- Owner: Sun Media; (Samuel K. Stratemeyer)
- Sister stations: WMJL WJLI, WRIK, WKRO

History
- First air date: July 1993; 32 years ago

Technical information
- Licensing authority: FCC
- Facility ID: 31436
- Class: A
- ERP: 6,000 watts
- HAAT: 100 meters
- Transmitter coordinates: 37°20′16″N 88°04′03″W

Links
- Public license information: Public file; LMS

WMJL-FM (102.7 FM) is a radio station broadcasting a Country format. Licensed to Marion, Kentucky, United States. The station is owned by Sun Media.

== History ==
The station began broadcasting in June 1993 under ownership by Crittenden County Broadcasting Company. The station was originally a simulcast of its AM counterpart, which was broadcasting a Country music format. The station was sold to Joe Myers Productions in late 1994.

As of April 1, 2018, the station changed ownership to Sun Media.

With new ownership, came a new format and other programming changes. Now broadcasting a country music format, instead of Classic Hits, and adding a live and local morning show, a first in WMJL's history.
