= WTHQ =

WTHQ may refer to:

- WTHQ (AM), a radio station (1030 AM) licensed to serve Point Pleasant, West Virginia, United States
- WRIK, a radio station (750 AM) licensed to serve Brookport, Illinois, United States, which held the call sign WTHQ from 2005 to 2013
