= William P. Halliday =

Steamboat captain and developer in Cairo, Illinois

William Parker Halliday
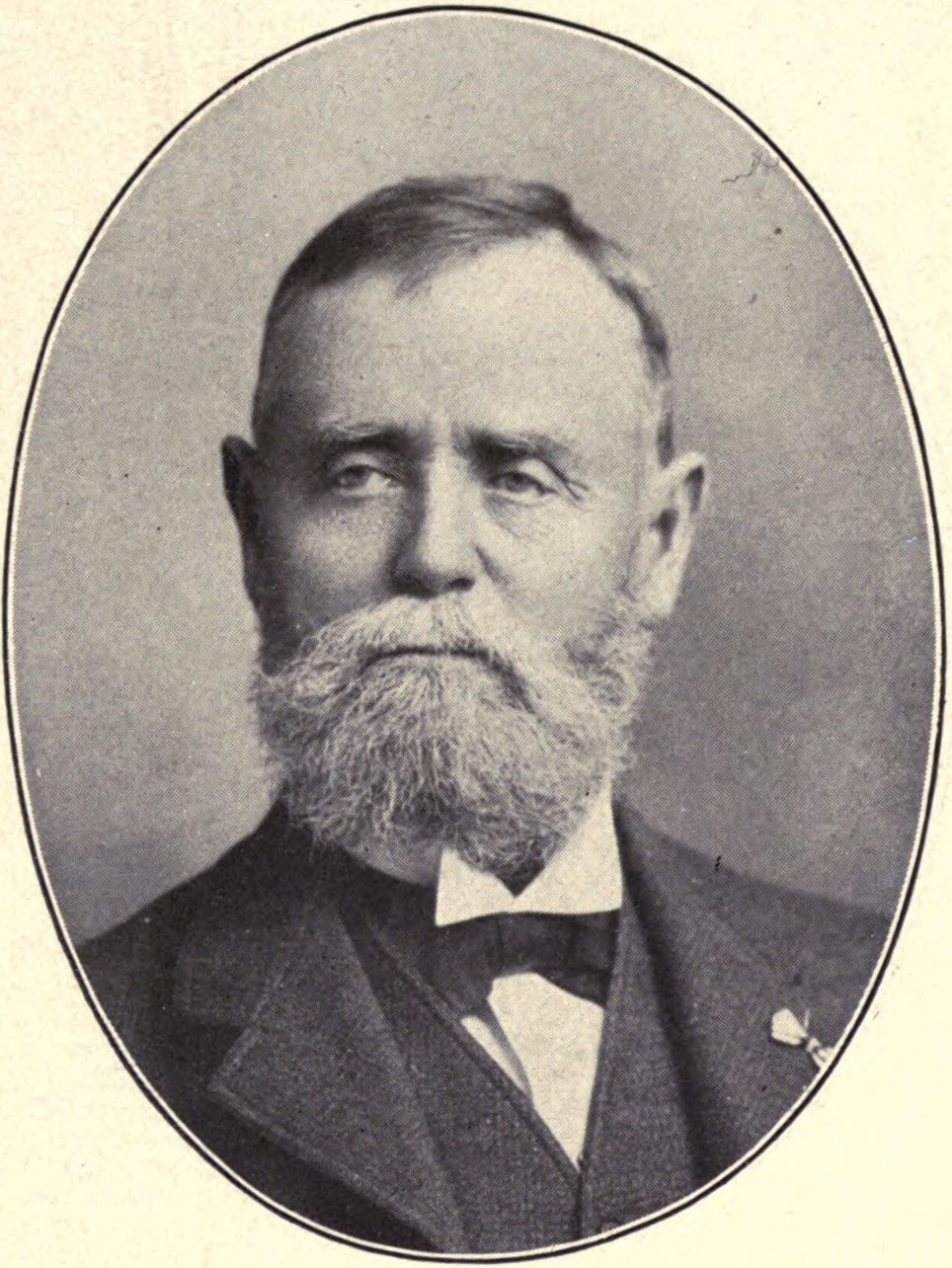
- Born: July 21, 1827; Rutland, Ohio, US
- Died: September 22, 1899 (aged 72); Cook County, Illinois, US
- Resting place: Beech Grove Cemetery, Mounds, Illinois
- Occupations: Steamboat Captain; Banker; Printer; Hotel owner Railroad executive Businessman
- Known for: River transportation business
- Board member of: Halliday Brothers Co. City National Bank of Cairo; Cairo City Coal Company; Cairo Street Railway Company; Cairo Telephone Company; Cairo Gas Company; Halliday Wharf Boat Company; Cairo and St. Louis Railroad; Cairo and Vincennes Railroad; First Bank and Trust Company; Halliday Hotel; Muddy Valley Mining and Manufacturing Company
- Spouse: Eliza Craig Wright
- Children: 6
- Relatives: Charles T. Hinde (brother-in law)

William Parker Halliday (July 21, 1827 – September 22, 1899) was an American steamboat captain, banker, printer, hotel owner, vast landowner and businessman. Halliday began his professional career working on steamboats on the Mississippi and Ohio rivers and eventually became a captain of a steamboat based out of Louisville, Kentucky. A pioneer in the river and railroad transportation businesses, Halliday was responsible for the expansion of Cairo, Illinois, following the American Civil War.

Before the war, Halliday predicted that it would greatly impact river and railroad transportation and moved to Cairo, Illinois, a town at a critical position, at the confluence of the Ohio and Mississippi rivers. Soon after relocating, Halliday established many businesses that focused on river transportation and general merchandise. During the war, Halliday became good friends with General Ulysses S. Grant, and this relationship increased his personal fortune considerably through favorable military contracts.

After the Civil War, Halliday, his four brothers, and other family members rapidly expanded their business interests in the region. Halliday purchased real estate, businesses, hotels, mines, railroads, lumber yards, steamboats, and furniture companies, and took advantage of many other business opportunities. His business success led to the advancement of the region and specifically contributed to the development of Cairo, Illinois, and Hallidayboro, Illinois.

== Early years ==
Halliday was born to Samuel Halliday and Eliza Parker in Ohio in 1827, the eldest of seven children. His father, an immigrant from Scotland, had graduated from the University of Edinburgh at the age of 19 and immigrated to America in 1818 to receive a professorship at Ohio University. However, his travel was difficult, and he became stranded in the small village of Rutland, where he was convinced to stay and open a school. Eventually, Samuel surveyed and planned a town with William Parker, Halliday's grandfather. Samuel held the position of county auditor in Meigs County, Ohio, for 25 years.

Halliday received a general education in Ohio and was first employed as a printer. His first job was as proprietor of Meigs County Gazette and later he worked at the Cincinnati Gazette. Sometime before 1857 Halliday became a surveyor working for the United States Department of the Interior under Marcus Baker and other surveyors. The purpose of the surveying group was to determine the northwesternmost boundary of the United States. Halliday worked on the surveying teams that surveyed the Poteau Mountain Quadrangle (Arkansas-Indian Territory), Tuskahoma Quadrangle, Antlers Quadrangle, Clarksville Quadrangle (Indian Territory-Texas), and other areas.

After a short time he switched careers and became a clerk on a steamboat, frequently working alongside Charles T. Hinde, who later married his sister. Halliday gradually advanced in the steamboat business until he was made a captain. In 1860, he relocated with his family to Cairo and initially worked as a commission merchant. Later, he was a merchant, cotton planter, lumberman, banker, miller, coal mine operator, owner of vast tracts of coal and farm lands, owned salt mines in Illinois, and was a pioneer lumber dealer in Cairo. Halliday was a very successful businessman and by the end of his life was a multimillionaire. He owned steamboats, hotels, commercial shipping businesses, and other investments.

== Civil War ==
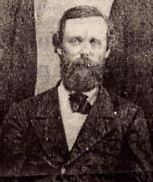
William P. Halliday, during the Civil War

Before the Civil War, Halliday lived in Louisville, Kentucky, and owned a grain business. In 1860, Halliday moved to Cairo, Illinois, predicting that war would come to Cairo thanks to its strategic location, and he set up businesses to benefit from the conflict. By February 1861, Halliday had established Halliday, Graham, & Co. and moved his "mammoth wharf boat" from Mound City, Illinois, down river to Cairo. Once the wharf boat arrived, journalists predicted that Halliday's company would be the most extensive forwarder in the Mississippi Valley, and Halliday organized a citywide celebration to mark the boat's arrival.

Halliday and his partner, N. W. Graham, signed a contract with Ulysses S. Grant for the Union Army's use of the wharf boat during the war. The contract compensated Halliday and Graham $1,000 per month and did not have an expiration date. Some commentators have suggested that the contract was a result of the close personal friendship of General Grant and Halliday, instead of sound military strategy. For a short time, General Grant made his military headquarters in the Halliday hotel in Cairo, Illinois.

During the war, Halliday and Grant became close friends. Grant commandeered one of Halliday's wharf boats for use in the Union Commissary Department, and soon after the boat was commandeered Halliday signed up to work as the commissary agent. Halliday gained the trust of Grant and, though he never enlisted in the army, Halliday accompanied General Grant to numerous battles and expeditions. In addition to the military uses Halliday's wharf boats were also used to connect the Mobile and Ohio Railroad with the Illinois Central Railroad at Cairo.

== Civil War ends ==
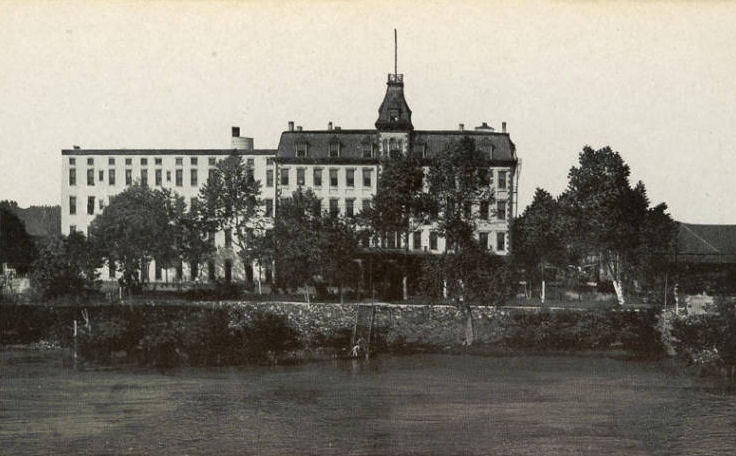
View from the Ohio River of the Halliday House Hotel located in Cairo, Illinois

In 1865, at the close of the Civil War, Halliday established several railroads with his close associates. On February 15, 1865, Halliday, Asa Eastman, S. Staats Taylor, N. R. Casey, Isham N. Haynie, Henry W. Webb, and John Q. Harman were granted a charter by the State of Illinois legislature to incorporate the Cairo and Mound City Railroad and were authorized to have $200,000 in capital stock. The next day the Illinois legislature approved the railroad charter for the Cairo and St. Louis Railroad on February 16, 1865, and Sharon Tyndale, Isham N. Haynie, Samuel Staats Taylor, John Thomas, William H. Logan, Halliday, and Tilman B. Cantrell were the original incorporators and were authorized to have $3,000,000 in capital stock. Also in 1865, Halliday and his brothers established the First Bank and Trust Company and bought the largest hotel in Cairo, renaming it after the family name.

== Riverlore Mansion ==
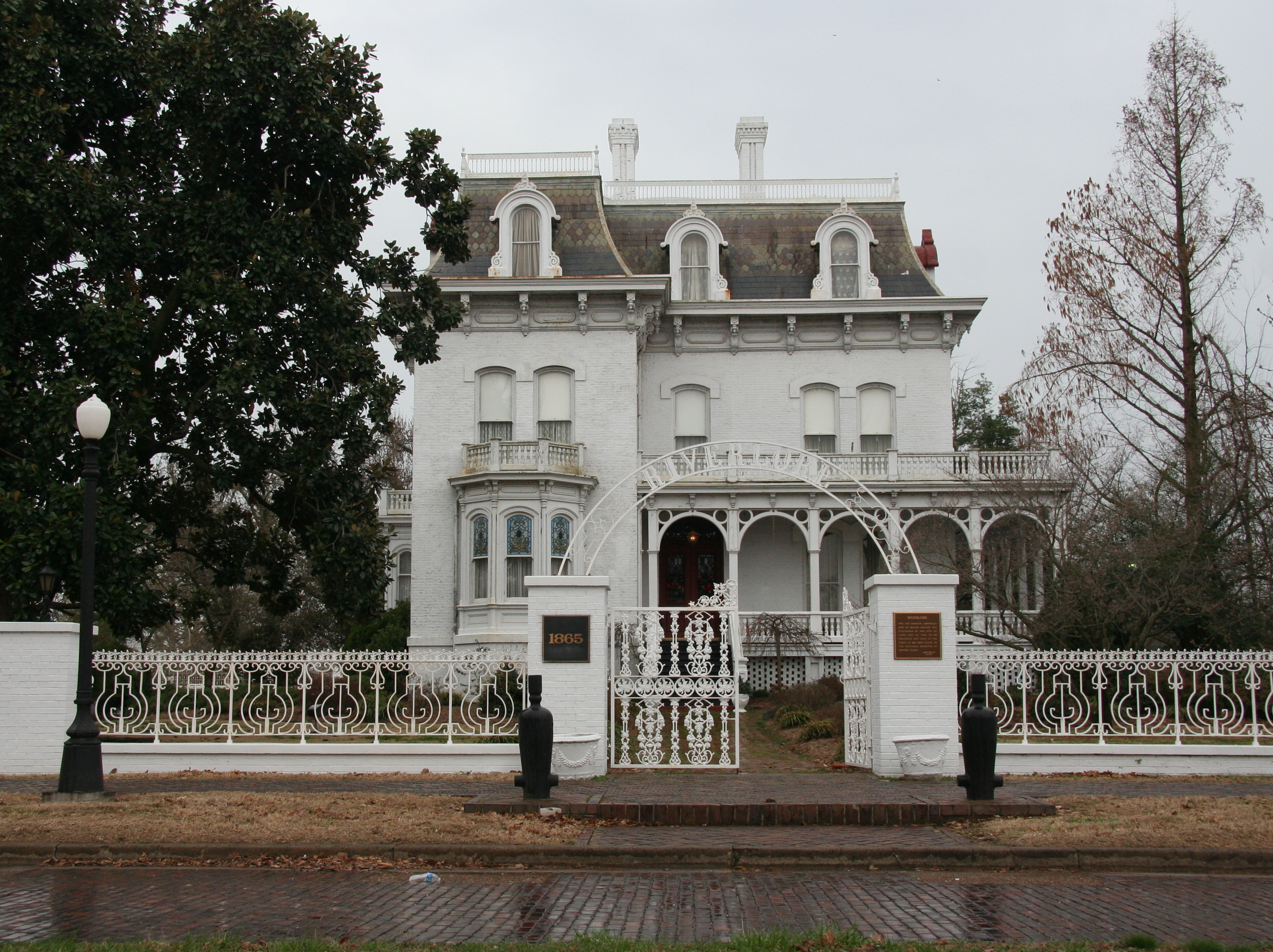
Riverlore Mansion is a stately white French Second Empire Style Mansion built in Cairo, Illinois on "Millionaire's Row". Riverlore is an 11-room brick home built in 1865 by Captain William Parker Halliday, a prominent Cairo businessman and riverboat captain.

Halliday built the Riverlore Mansion in 1865 in Cairo, Illinois, across the street from the Magnolia Manor. The brick mansion has 11 rooms, three floors, and a basement. When the mansion was completed in 1865, it spanned the entire city block.

The first floor of the mansion has the front entry, sitting area, family room, parlor, kitchen, sunroom, dining room, hallway and powder room. An oval central stairway with a curved cherry balustrade winds more than three stories, encompassing some 38 feet to the slate mansard roof, which is capped by an ornamental iron railing. The second floor has three guest bedrooms, a guest bath, a sitting room, a master bedroom, and a luxurious bath complete with a sunken tub. The third floor has a sitting area, an office, a library, and a theater complete with a stage and 18 movie seats.

Part of the original design of the Riverlore is the distinctive river boat theme of the house. There is a glassed-in pilothouse with a sliding hatch that serves as the entrance to the roof. The roof was designed to be flat and resemble the deck of a steamboat, so that Halliday could view the river and reminisce about his early days working as a steamboat captain while standing on his roof. Captain Halliday lived at the Riverlore for 34 years.

== Business career following the Civil War ==
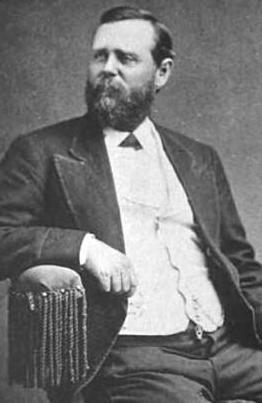
William P. Halliday, Cairo & Vincennes Railway Board of Director

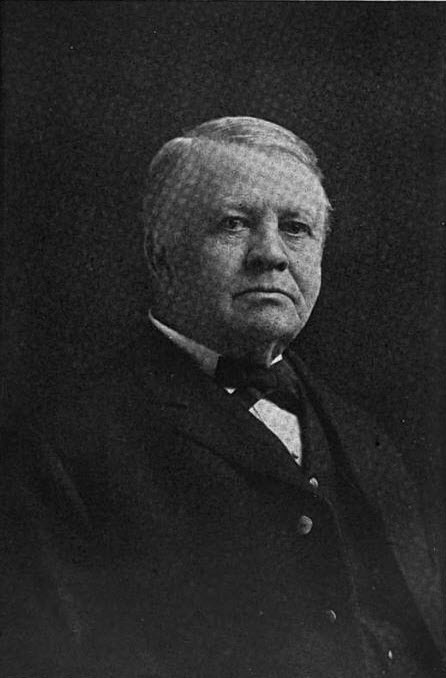
Samuel P. Wheeler, friend and fellow Cairo & Vincennes Railway Board of Director

Halliday and his brothers achieved substantial business success following the Civil War through a variety of businesses and investments. One commentator has stated that by the 1880s the Halliday family was among the most powerful in the region, and Halliday was the significant figure in the family. Halliday the driving force behind the firm of Halliday Bros in Cairo had four brothers, the brothers together operated as members of the firm Halliday Bros. The brother's character in business and personal life has been noted in many writings, publications, and books, one such book A History of the City of Cairo Illinois by John M. Lansden speaks of the brothers:

There were five of them, a somewhat exceptional number: William P. Halliday, Samuel B. Halliday, Edwin W. Halliday, Henry L. Halliday, and Thomas W. Halliday. Of them all, I may be permitted to say that while they all differed from each other, they all exhibited features of character and conduct that would have given them prominence anywhere in the business world. No doubt in some one or two important respects, each one excelled the others. This was shown in those matters and things to which they gave their chief attention. Speaking of them and their families, so well represented here with us and elsewhere, it can be said that they have always stood for better things, not with assumption or pharisaically, but openly and firmly. They pushed their business enterprises with diligence, and had there been more of such men it would have been better for the city and for them also, I have no doubt.

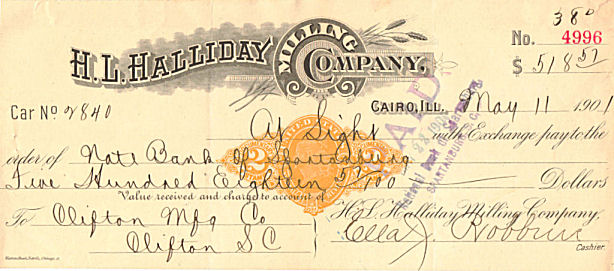
This is a check printed for the H.L. Halliday Milling Company by the Western Bank Note Co, Chicago. It was issued by the H.L. Halliday Milling Company located in Cairo, Illinois May 11, 1901.

The Halliday business empire following the Civil War comprised numerous businesses in Cairo, cotton lands in Arkansas, a hotel in Memphis, Tennessee, furniture companies in Memphis and New Orleans, coal mines in southern Illinois, salt wells in southern Illinois and Indiana, numerous large farms, and many other investments. Halliday and his brothers dealt heavily in flour following the Civil War.

In order to keep updated on their daily business activities Halliday and his brothers installed private telegraph lines between their residences and their business offices. In the early 1870s Halliday held the public office of city councilman for the city of Cairo Illinois, for the city at large ward with Daniel Hurd.

On March 5, 1867, Halliday, David J. Baker Jr., Alfred B. Safford, Daniel Hurd, and George D. Williamson were granted permission by the Illinois legislature to incorporate The Valley Iron Company.

The capital stock of the company was $200,000 and the company headquarters were in Cairo, Illinois. The company's purpose was to mine and manufacture iron and other metals, with the stated purpose of supplying railroads. Also at this time, Halliday, Hurd, Safford, and others served on the transportation committee of the Illinois Central Railroad.

During the Civil War Halliday was associated with the Mobile and Ohio Railroad through the railroad's use of his wharf boats. After the war, Halliday became a major investor in the railroad along with William Butler Duncan I, Charles Walsh, and Charles Edward Tracy. Halliday's investments centered around the railroad's expansion to Cairo in the late 1870s. On April 22, 1874, the shareholders of the Mobile and Ohio Railroad elected Halliday to the board of directors.

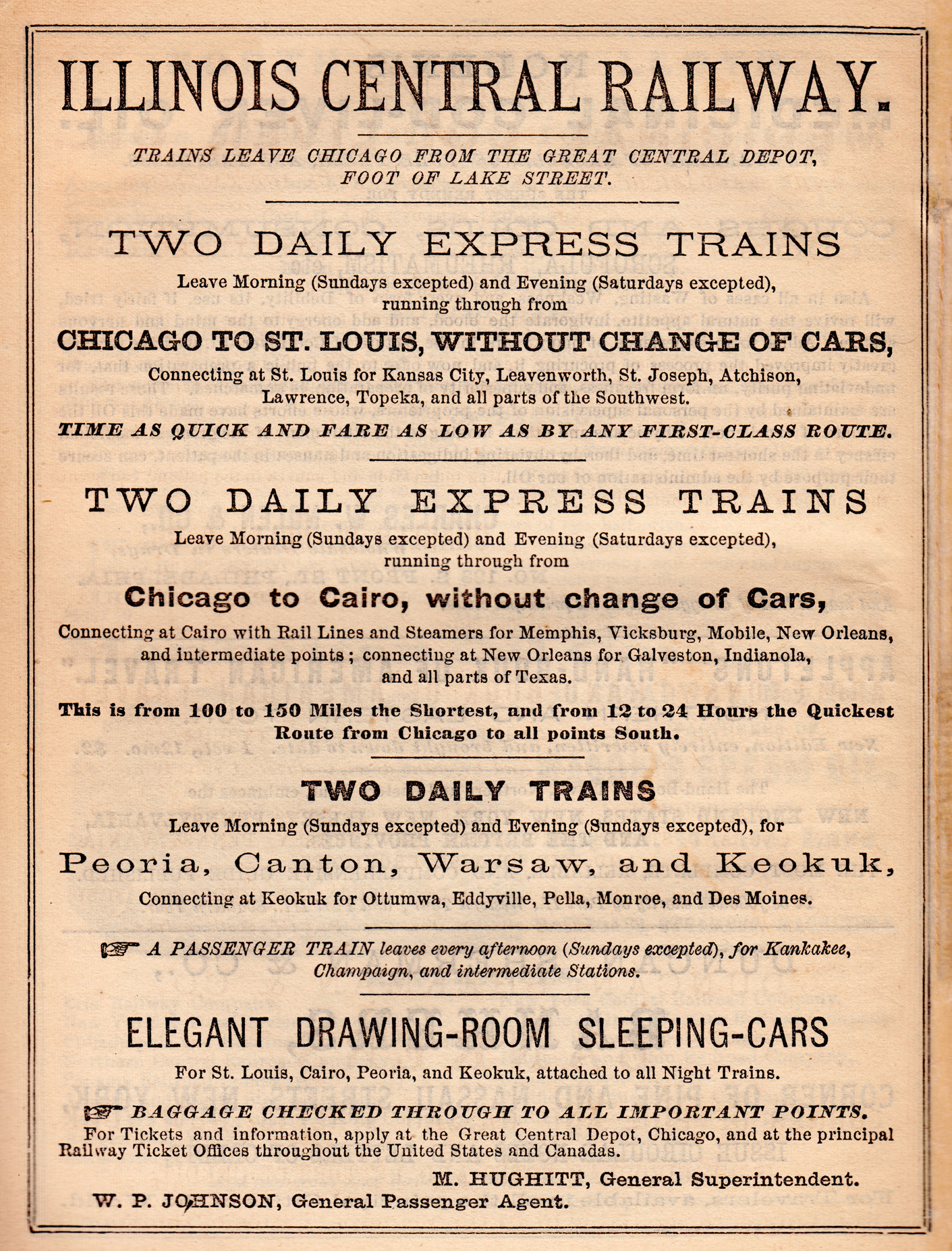
Illinois Central ad (1870)

As Halliday's business interests grew, he began investing in businesses that supported his railroad and steamboat businesses, primarily coal mines. Halliday purchased his first coal mine in St. John, Illinois, to supply his steamships and coal depots.

Due to the success of the coal mines, Halliday began to purchase property in the area to search for oil. He was unsuccessful in locating oil deposits but did find one of the most productive salt mines in the region. Haliiday's brother-in-law, Marion Wright, ran and oversaw the Halliday coal and salt mines.

Although Halliday had originally invested in the Cairo and Vincennes Railway in 1865, it was not completed and incorporated until July 9, 1880. In the 15 years in between, Halliday was able to attract many influential and important investors to the project. Banking tycoon, J. P. Morgan served as president and as a director of the railroad with Halliday. In 1869, Halliday spent eight weeks in New York City with co-investors Burnside, Hurd, and Raum trying to get investment for the Cairo and Vinncennes Railway project. During the trip, Halliday was able to gain the support and investment of the United States railroad construction company.

== William P. Halliday and the town of Hallidayboro Illinois ==
The town of Muddy Valley, Illinois, which was located in Jackson County, Illinois, was renamed Hallidayboro in 1894 in honor of Halliday. Halliday was a major investor and owner of the Muddy Valley Mining and Manufacturing Company located in the town. The company remained in Halliday's estate for over 30 years after his death. When the company was sold, it consisted of 5,700 acres of coal lands, numerous mine buildings and property, and several farms. The town was planned by Halliday based on his friend George Pullman's ideas developed from a similar industrial mining town he had founded earlier. Halliday wanted to avoid the labor and capital disputes that plagued the era by creating a model town for his mine workers and their families. At the height of the mine's production, Halliday employed over 500 men. White and black families lived and worked together, and it was one of the first towns in southern Illinois to have electricity.

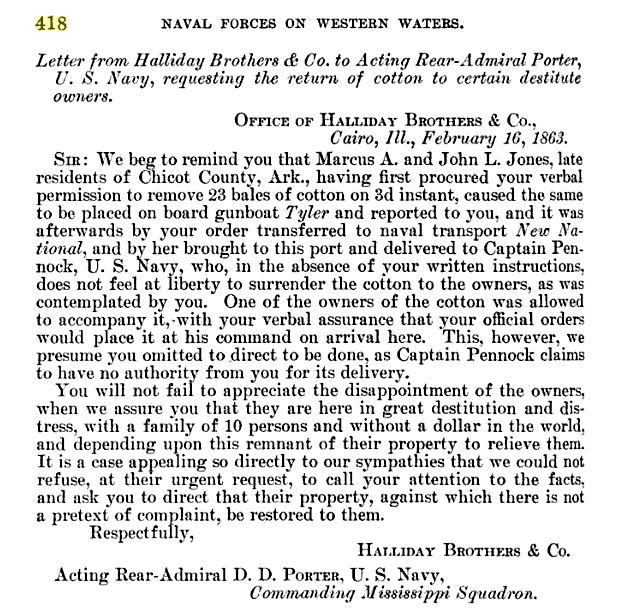
Records of the Union and Confederate Navies in the War of the Rebellion: Letter from Halliday Brothers & Co. to Acting Rear-Admiral Porter, U.S. Navy, requesting the return of cotton to certain destitute owners. Page 418 Series I Volume 24

William Parker Halliday became acquainted with George Pullman through his many business interests which took him to Chicago, Springfield, and Washington, D.C. Halliday owned his own Pullman Palace Car, a personal gift from George Pullman.

The town, originally named Muddy Valley, contrasted sharply with other southern Illinois coal towns, commonly referred to as "mining camps". Some aspects of Halllidayboro so closely resembled Pullman as to leave no doubt of William Halliday's intention to pattern his community after the cook county town. Tenements showing a distinctive style of architecture set in the midst of well-manicured trees and gardens caused journalists to designate the town a "Storybook Village".

Employees at Hallidayboro commonly worked a ten-hour day, but by 1898 William Halliday's mines adopted an eight-hour schedule on all shifts and agreed to pay union wage.

An interest in farming came naturally to William Halliday. Besides teaching, his father, Samuel, farmed successfully in Scotland and in the United States. Halliday owned a prosperous cotton plantation in Arkansas in addition to several thousand cultivated acres not connected with the model town. The 3500 cultivated acres surrounding the village provided important staples for the town. Forage for the mine mules as well as food for mining families came from company farms. In order to process its own meat, the company operated a slaughterhouse. By using this system the store was able to sell fresh meat at affordable prices.

George Pullman and William Halliday familiarized themselves with their industrial operations, giving attention to the minutest details. Their labor forces, tempered by the demands of industry in America, expected to work hard in exchange for the necessities of life. Cooperation between managers and workers created a higher standard of living, which in turn, encouraged better working conditions. Good housing also helped promote good work habits.

In the United States, unbearably inadequate housing and overcrowded neighborhoods pushed working men out of the home and into saloons where they congregated for drink and discussion. Wealthy capitalists wishing to strike a balance between the demands of labor and desires of capital looked to Robert Owen's example. George Pullman and William Halliday implemented a policy of tolerance in their towns identical to that of Robert Owen. The peaceful atmosphere in Pullman and Hallidayboro can be attributed in part to the absence of alcohol.

That Hallidayboro was relatively peaceful is especially significant because most coal towns in the region were prone to "heinous crime". Residents in other southern Illinois coal towns, containing no policy of temperance, often experienced murder and fatal injuries resulting from bar-room brawls. Violence sometimes took the form of wife-beating. Several southern Illinois miners died at the hands of a frustrated spouse.

Reformers reasoned that adequate housing could counter the drinking problems. George Pullman adhered to this idea. He believed that a good residential surrounding would benefit the workers and that beauty in the town would breed good character in the residents. Pullman hoped the comfortable, beautiful environment of his town would encourage cleanliness, industriousness and sobriety in the work force. Attractive housing with adequate living space did create good work habits in the towns.

William Halliday, like George Pullman, had cherished a desire to create a model company town.

Hallidayboro's housing compared favorably to that in other model company towns during this period. Not until the turn of the century did comparable company houses appear in southern Illinois, when Joseph Leiter built the town of Zeigler. In contrast to Hallidayboro's bustling, peaceful environment, coal miners never lived in the attractive houses provided by Joseph Leiter.

Until 1920, electricity was rare in southern Illinois communities, except in Hallidayboro.

Raised by teachers, William Halliday also believed in the value of education. One of the original buildings in Hallidayboro, the schoolhouse followed the overall architecture scheme of the village. Nestled at the west end of Main Street, the frame schoolhouse accommodated forty students. Typical of the period, separated entrances for boys and girls appeared under the twin bell towers. It is also likely that Halliday maintained a book collection for the use of the residents of his company town. In his home city he served on the Cairo Library Board and he endowed the Cairo Library with $5,000.00 in his will. A high degree of literacy existed in Hallidayboro.

Towns such as Pullman and Hallidayboro supported Robert Owen's original belief that owners could profit from helping their workers.

== Later life and legacy ==
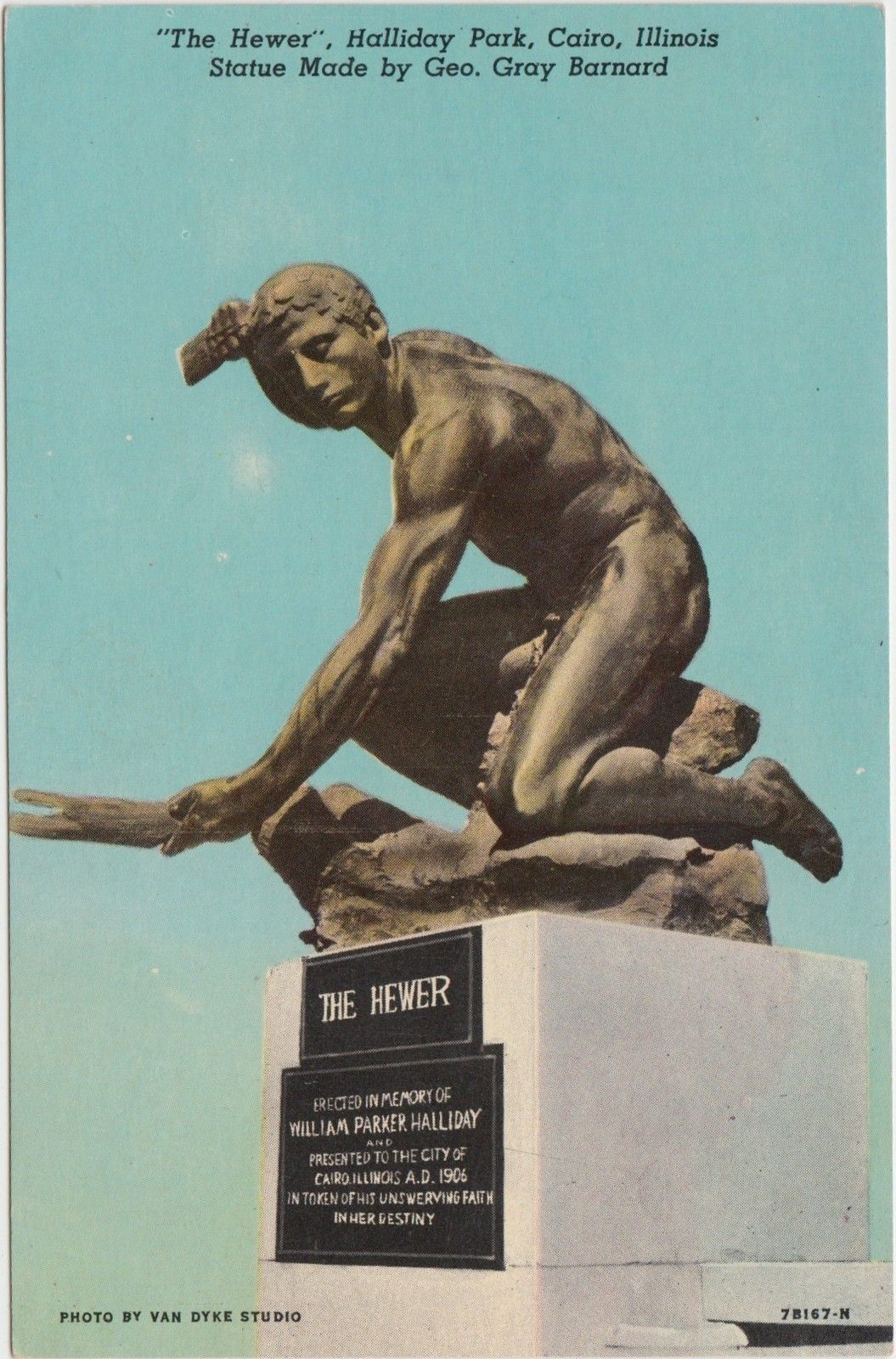
The Hewer Statue erected in honor of Captain William Parker Halliday, Cairo, Illinois 1906. Sculpted by George Grey Barnard. Image/Postcard 7B167-N (Printed 1947)167th card printed that year.

Towards the end of his life, Halliday was the president of the Illinois Bankers Association. In 1885, Halliday was president of the City National Bank of Cairo and his brother, Thomas W. Halliday was listed as Cashier of the bank. At the time the bank had $772,994.34 of available funds. Based on inflation from 1885 to 2012, $772,994.34 is the money equivalent to approx $19,451,163 today.

Ever since moving to Cairo in 1860, Halliday was a huge force in the development of the city and region. One source describes his contributions in the following manner, "In life he was one of the city's staunchest friends. No labor in her interests was too arduous for him to undertake, no expense for her welfare or promotion too great for him too assume. Numerous monuments to his far-seeing sagacity exist to-day and will exist for centuries to come." Another source described Halliday by stating, "He is an effective worker, accomplishing more by action than a half dozen men might by talking."

In addition to the town, Halliday also named one of his steamboats the William P. Halliday. It was under the command of Sobieski Jolly and was mentioned in Mark Twain's papers. The boat was destroyed by fire on a Monday morning in February 1884 while it was next to the St. Louis City wharf.

In 1895, Halliday and other leading men were appointed to the first set of officers to direct the Ohio Valley Improvement Association. The primary purpose of the organization was to be the collection, preparation, and presentation to the United States Congress statistics and other information relating to commerce and navigation on the Ohio River. Halliday served as one of six vice presidents, and the sitting governor of West Virginia, Mac Corkle was present. The following year in 1896, Halliday was reelected as a vice president of the Ohio Valley Improvement Association at the second annual convention held in Pittsburgh, Pennsylvania.

In 1898, about one year before Halliday died, he and other merchants and businessmen in Cairo sponsored a boat race from Mound City, Illinois to Cairo, Illinois. The race offered a cash prize to the winner and was widely reported in the newspapers of towns and villages along the Ohio River. Halliday stood next to the Halliday House and shot a gun when the first boat crossed the finish line to announce to the crowd of people the winning boat.

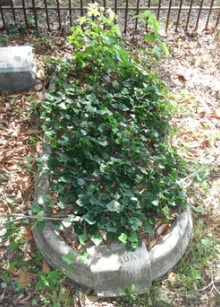
William P. Halliday, tombstone in Mound City, Illinois

Halliday spent the last six months of his life residing in the Lexington Hotel in Chicago, Illinois. He had been battling an illness during his stay in Chicago and died from the condition. At his death he was reputed to be worth from $3,000,000 to $4,000,000. Based on inflation from 1899 to 2012, $4,000,000 is the money equivalent to approx $108,649,539 today. After Halliday's death in 1899, his estate left the Cairo Public Library $5,000, to be used to expand the collection of rare and fine edition books. Halliday had served as president of the library board. In 1906, Halliday's daughter Mary presented the Hewer to the city of Cairo in honor of her father. The Hewer is a historic bronze nude by George Grey Barnard that was exhibited at the St. Louis World's Fair and was considered to be one of the two best nudes in the United States.

Halliday and his wife, Eliza W. Halliday, separated from each other and had a legally binding separation agreement in force at the time of his death. His wife dissented from the terms of his will and instead took her dower rights under Illinois law, which at that time amounted to one third of all property and personalty in his estate. Soon after his wife was granted her dower rights, his wife and six children created the W. P. Halliday trust and funded it in 1900 with $1,062,921.88 from Halliday's estate. In 1939 the estate was held to be an association, and tax deficiencies were levied against the trust beneficiaries for unpaid taxes owed to the Internal Revenue Service. Over the course of time the trust was in existence the beneficiaries expanded the trust holdings through the purchase of stock, real estate, and businesses and the majority of these investments were very profitable.
