= WKRO =

WKRO may refer to:

- WKRO (AM), a radio station (1490 AM) licensed to Cairo, Illinois, United States
- WKRO-FM, a radio station (93.1 FM) licensed to Edgewater, Florida, United States
