= Cairo, Illinois =

City in the United States

- City
- Washington Avenue in Cairo, Illinois

- Flag Seal
- Interactive map of Cairo, Illinois
- Location within Illinois Location within the United States
- Coordinates: 37°0′47″N 89°10′49″W
- Country: United States
- State: Illinois
- County: Alexander
- Incorporated: 1857
- Named for: Cairo, Egypt

Government
  - Mayor: Thomas Simpson

Area
  - Total: 9.11 sq mi (23.59 km^{2})
  - Land: 6.99 sq mi (18.10 km^{2})
  - Water: 2.12 sq mi (5.49 km^{2})
- Elevation: 315 ft (96 m)

Population (2020)
  - Total: 1,733
  - Estimate (2025): 1,515 ▼
  - Density: 248.0/sq mi (95.77/km^{2})
- Time zone: UTC−6 (CST)
  - Summer (DST): UTC−5 (CDT)
- ZIP Code: 62914
- Area code: 618
- FIPS code: 17-10383
- GNIS feature ID: 2393491
- Wikimedia Commons: Cairo, Illinois

Cairo (/ˈkɛər.oʊ/, KAIR-oh, sometimes /ˈkeɪ.roʊ/, KAY-roh) is the southernmost city in the U.S. state of Illinois and the county seat of Alexander County. A river city, Cairo has the lowest elevation of any location in Illinois and is the state's only city to be surrounded by levees. The city is named after Egypt's capital on the Nile and is located in the river-crossed area of Southern Illinois. It is coterminous with Cairo Precinct.

Cairo is located at the confluence of the Ohio and Mississippi rivers, two of the largest rivers in North America, by discharge, and is near the Cache River complex, a Wetland of International Importance. Settlement began in earnest in the 1830s, and busy river boat traffic expanded through the 1850s. Fort Defiance, a Civil War base, was located here in 1862 by Union General Ulysses S. Grant to control strategic access to the rivers and launch and supply his successful campaigns south. The town also served as a naval base for the Mississippi River Squadron to pursue the Anaconda Plan to win the war. Developed as a river port, Cairo was later bypassed by transportation changes away from the large expanse of low-lying land, wetland, and water, which surrounds Cairo and makes such infrastructure difficult. Due to industrial restructuring, the population peaked at 15,203 in 1920, while in the 2020 census, it was 1,733. Its population has been shrinking for decades. A majority of residents are African American.

Several blocks in the town comprise the Cairo Historic District, listed on the National Register of Historic Places (NRHP). The Old Customs House is also on the NRHP. The city is part of the Cape Girardeau–Jackson metropolitan area.

The entire city was evacuated during Mississippi River floods in 2011, after the Ohio River rose higher than the 1937 flood levels, with the possibility of Cairo being inundated by 15 feet of water. To prevent flooding in Cairo and other more populous areas farther downstream along both the Ohio and Mississippi rivers, the United States Army Corps of Engineers breached levees in the Mississippi flood zone in Missouri, near Cairo.

== History ==
=== Beginnings ===
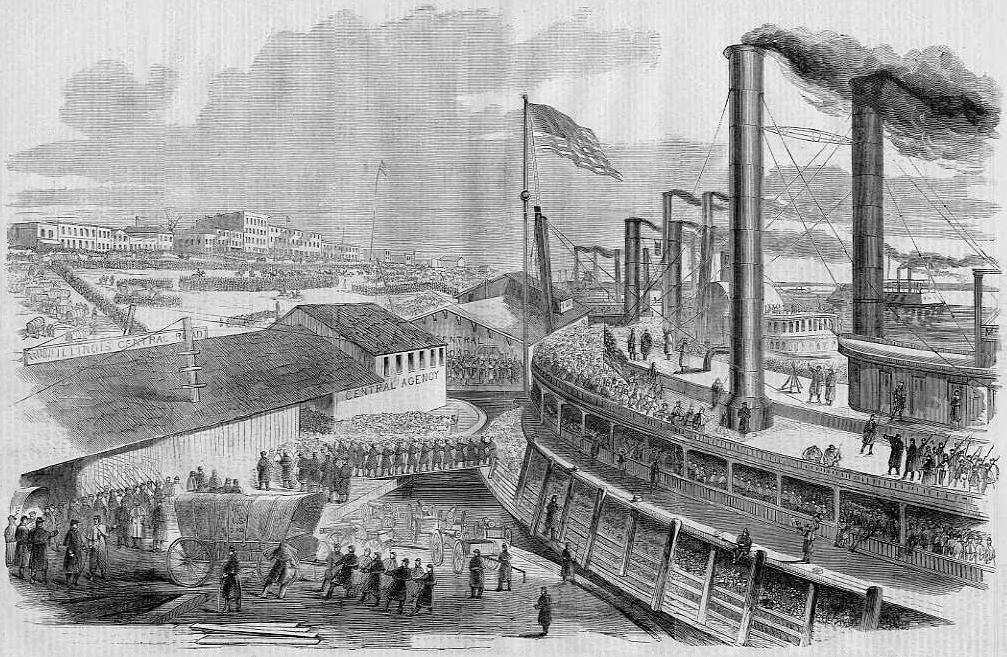
The embarkation of Union troops from Cairo on January 10, 1862

Cairo was named after the Egyptian city of the same name because its location at the confluence of the Ohio and Mississippi Rivers was reminiscent of the Nile Delta.

The first municipal charter for Cairo and the Bank of Cairo were issued in 1818, but without any settlement and without any depositors. A second and successful effort to establish a town was made by the Cairo City and Canal Company in 1836–37, with a large levee built to encircle the site. However, this effort collapsed in 1840, with few settlers remaining.

Charles Dickens visited Cairo in 1842, and was unimpressed. The city would serve as his prototype for the nightmare City of Eden in his novel Martin Chuzzlewit. In 1846, 10,000 acres in Cairo were purchased by the trustees of the Cairo City Property Trust, a group of investors including writer John Neal who planned to make it the terminus of the projected Illinois Central Railroad, which finally arrived there in 1855.

Cairo had been growing as an important river port for steamboats, which traveled all the way south to New Orleans. The city had been designated as a port of delivery by Act of Congress in 1854.

A new city charter was written in 1857, and Cairo flourished as trade with Chicago to the north spurred development. By 1860, the population exceeded 2,000.

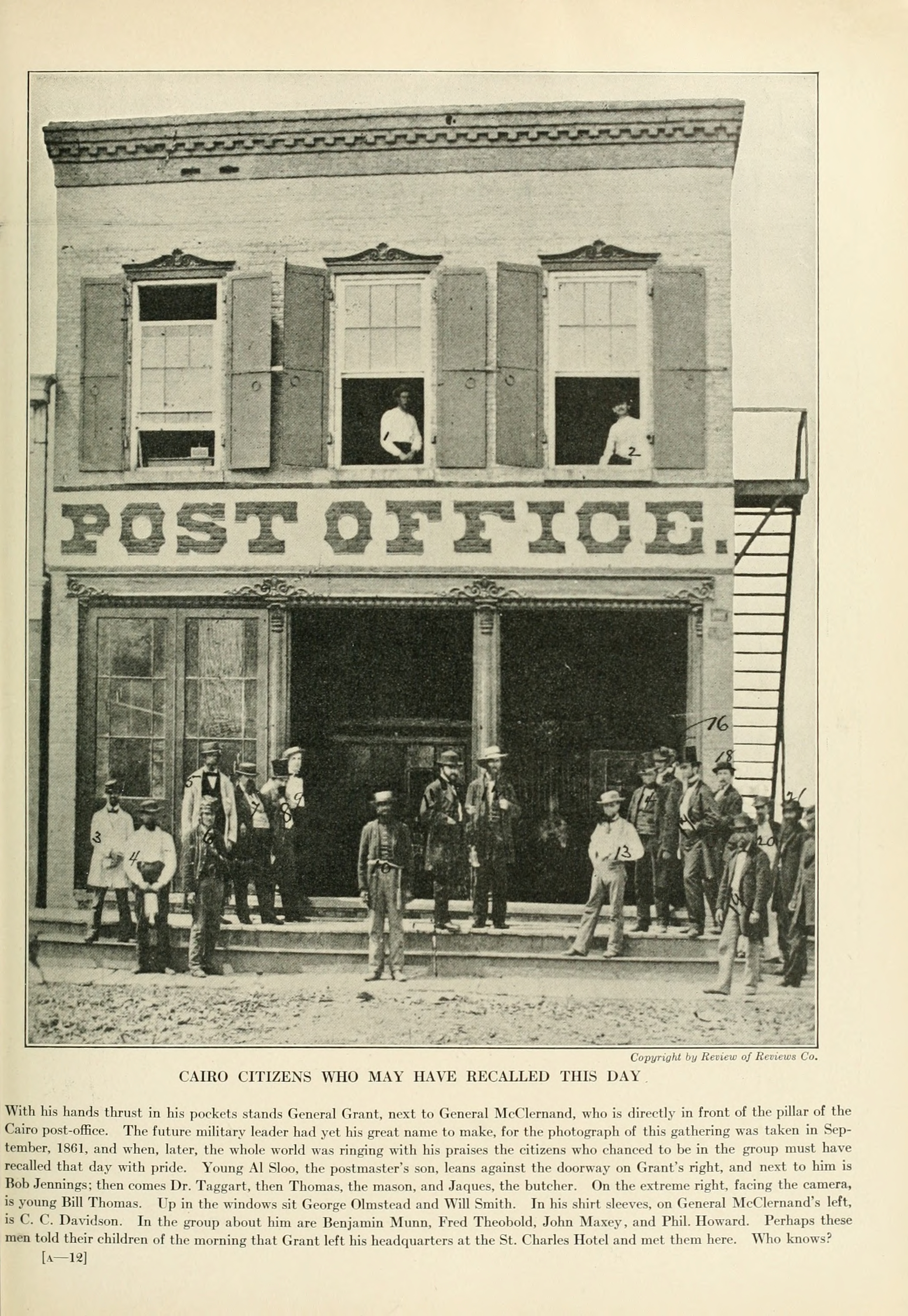
General Grant's headquarters.

During the Civil War, Admiral Andrew Hull Foote made Cairo the naval station for the Mississippi River Squadron on September 6, 1861. Since Cairo had no land available for base facilities, the navy yard repair shop machinery was afloat aboard wharf-boats, old steamers, tugs, flat-boats, and rafts. In January 1862, General Ulysses S. Grant occupied the city, and had Fort Defiance constructed to protect the confluence. Cairo became an important Union supply base and training center for the remainder of the war.

Military occupation caused much of the city's trade to be diverted by railroad to Chicago. Cairo failed to regain this important trade after the war, as more railroads converged on Chicago and it developed at a rapid pace, attracting stockyards, meat processing, and heavy industries. Instead, agriculture, lumber, and sawmills now dominated the Cairo economy.

=== Post-war prosperity ===
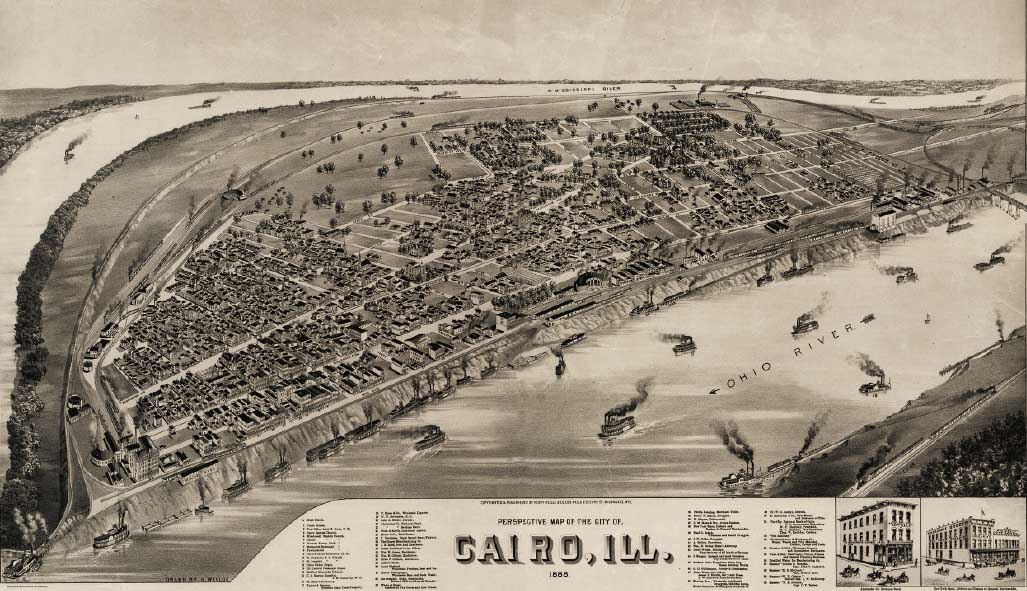
A panoramic map of Cairo, 1885. The Ohio River is in the front and the Mississippi River is behind the city.

The strategic importance of Cairo's geographic location during the Civil War sparked prosperity in the town. Several banks were founded during the war years, and the growth in banking and steamboat traffic continued after the war.

In 1869, construction began on the United States Custom House and Post Office, which was designed by Alfred B. Mullet, the Supervising Architect. The custom house was completed in 1872. It served as a custom house, post office, and United States Court. The U.S. District Court for the Southern District of Illinois met at the building until 1905.

From 1905 to 1942, the Custom House was used for the U.S. District Court for the Eastern District of Illinois. The building also housed the U.S. Circuit Court for the Eastern District of Illinois from 1905 to 1912. At the height of Cairo's prosperity, the post office in the building was the third busiest in the United States. It is one of only seven of Mullet's Victorian structures remaining in the nation, and the building has been converted for use as a museum. It is listed on the National Register of Historic Places.

After the Civil War, the city became a hub for railroad shipping in the region, which added to its economy. By 1900, several railroad lines branched from Cairo. In addition to shipping and railroads, a major industry in Cairo was the operation of ferries. Into the late 19th century, nearly 250,000 railroad cars could be ferried across the river in as little as six months. Motor vehicles were also ferried, as there were no automobile bridges in the area in the early 20th century. The ferry industry created numerous jobs in Cairo to handle large amounts of cargo and numerous passengers through the city.

Wealthy merchants and shippers built numerous fine mansions in the 19th and early 20th century, including the Italianate Magnolia Manor, completed in 1872, and the Second Empire Riverlore Mansion, built by Capt. William P. Halliday in 1865. Across the street from the customs house, the Cairo Public Library was constructed in 1883 of Queen Anne-style architecture, finished with stained glass windows and ornate woodwork. The library was dedicated on July 19, 1884, as the A. B. Safford Memorial Library. Anna E. Safford paid for the construction of the Library and donated it to the city. These and other significant buildings are also listed on the National Register.

For protection from seasonal flooding, Cairo is completely enclosed by a series of levees and flood walls, due to its low elevation between the rivers. Several buildings, including the old custom house, were originally designed to be built to a higher street level, to be at the same height as the top of the levees. That plan was scrapped as the cost of fill to raise the streets and surrounding land to that height proved to be impractical. In 1914, a large flood gate was constructed by Stupp Brothers of St. Louis, Missouri. The flood gate is known as the "Big Subway Gate", and it was designed to seal the northern levee in Cairo by closing over U.S. Highway 51. The gate weighs 80 tons, is 60 feet wide, 24 feet high, and five feet thick. With the addition of the gate, Cairo could become an island, completely sealed off from approaching flood waters.

Following the Great Mississippi Flood of 1927, the levee system around Cairo was reinforced. As part of this project, the Corps of Engineers established the Birds Point-New Madrid Floodway. The Ohio River flood of 1937 brought a record water level to Cairo that crested at 59.5 feet. To protect Cairo, Corps of Engineers closed the flood gate and blew a breach in the Bird's Point levee for the first time to relieve pressure on the Cairo flood wall. Following the flood, the concrete flood wall was raised to its current height. It is designed to protect the town from flood waters up to 64 feet.

In 1942, the federal government constructed a new U.S. Post Office and Courthouse in Cairo. Still growing, the city had a population approaching 15,000. The new federal court house, located at 1500 Washington, was designed by the architects Louis A. Simon and George Howe. The U.S. District Court for the Eastern District of Illinois moved into the new courthouse in 1942, from the old U.S. Custom House and Post Office.

After the U.S. district court structure in Illinois was reorganized in 1978, the court house was used for the U.S. District Court for the Southern District of Illinois. The building remains in use by the federal courts and as the active post office for Cairo. The courthouse was built and is operated by the U.S. General Services Administration.

=== Lynchings ===
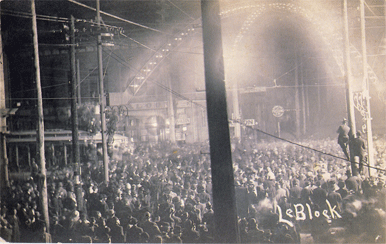
An estimated crowd of 10,000 gathered for the lynching of Will James on November 11, 1909.

Cairo's history of race relations is marked by the 1909 lynchings of black resident William James and white resident Henry Salzner. In 1900, Cairo had a population of nearly 13,000. Of that total, approximately 5,000 residents were African-American, or 38 percent. In 1900, this was an unusually high black population for a town of Cairo's size in the North. Five percent of all black residents in the state of Illinois lived here. Later in the early 20th century, Chicago became the center of black life in the state, as it was the destination of tens of thousands of migrants during the Great Migration.

The Illinois constitution of 1818 allowed for limited slavery in the salt mines and allowed current slave owners to retain their slaves. The General Assembly also passed legislation that severely curtailed the rights of free blacks residing in the state and discouraged the migration of free blacks. If a black person was unable to present proof of their freedom they could be fined $50 or sold by the sheriff to the highest bidder. Not long after the passage of the constitution, the state's general assembly adopted a pro-slavery resolution that announced its approval of slavery in slave-holding states and at the same time condemned the formation of abolition societies within Illinois’ boundaries.

Although Black people comprised a large proportion of the Cairo population, they were frequently discriminated against in jobs and housing. Race relations were strained in 1900. The state passed an anti-lynching law in 1905.

On the night of November 11, 1909, two men were lynched. The first was William James, an African American accused of the rape and murder of Anna Pelly, a young white woman. The second man lynched was Henry Salzner, a white man who had allegedly murdered his white wife the previous August. A group of civil rights activists in Chicago hired journalist Ida B. Wells to investigate the lynchings. After the residents had calmed down, Governor Deneen enforced the 1905 anti-lynching law by dismissing Sheriff Davis for failing to protect James and Salzner. Wells sided with the governor against reinstatement.

=== Economic decline ===
The slow economic decline of Cairo can be traced to local and regional changes back to the early 20th century. In 1889, the Illinois Central Railroad bridge was completed over the Ohio River, which brought about a decline in ferry business. The immediate economic impact was not severe, as the railroad traffic still was directed through Cairo, and automobile and truck traffic increased in the early 20th century.

In 1905, a second bridge was constructed across the Mississippi River at Thebes, Illinois. The effects of the second bridge were more severe, as rail traffic through Cairo was now reduced and railroad ferry operations were no longer necessary. As the steamboat industry was replaced with barges, river traffic had less reason to stop in Cairo.

In 1929, the Cairo Mississippi River Bridge was completed, linking Missouri with Illinois to the south of Cairo. In 1937, the Cairo Ohio River Bridge was completed. Completion of the two bridges ended the ferry industry in Cairo, putting many people out of work. As the town was bypassed by two bridges to the south, it also lost the benefit of motorist travel and trade between the states. Motorists cross the southern tip of Illinois between Missouri and Kentucky, completely bypassing the city of Cairo. While the city was protected by its levees from destruction when the Ohio River rose to record heights during the 1937 flood, the city's economic decline continued.

=== Racial tensions and further decline ===
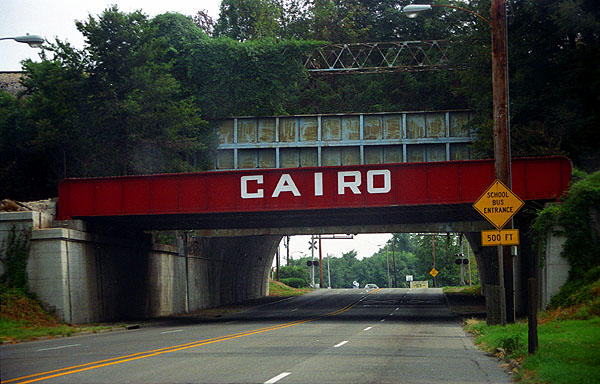
The Cairo Levee underpass

Between the 1930s and 1960s, the population in Cairo remained fairly steady; however, many jobs were gone as the shipping, railroad, and ferry industries left the city. Population decline began as workers moved to other cities.

Racial tensions rose in the late 1960s as African-Americans sought implementation of gains under new federal civil rights laws passed as a result of the Civil Rights Movement. The police, fire department, and most city jobs were still overwhelmingly dominated by whites. African-Americans were allegedly harassed by the police and unjustly targeted. On July 16, 1967, Robert Hunt, a 19-year-old black soldier home on leave, was allegedly found hanged in the Cairo police station. Police reported that Hunt had hanged himself with his t-shirt, but many members of the black community of Cairo accused the police of murder. There had been a history of alleged police discrimination and violence against black residents of the city.

The death of Robert Hunt sparked aggressive protests in Cairo's black community. On July 17, 1967, a large portion of the black population in Cairo began rioting. The black rioting that erupted in 1967 was not confined to Cairo; it was part of a larger pattern of more than 40 racially motivated riots that broke out in major cities in the United States in the summer of 1967. During the night of rioting on July 17, three stores and a warehouse in Cairo were burned to the ground, and windows were broken out of numerous other buildings. The National Guard unit at Cairo was activated to respond to the violence.

On July 20, 1967, one of the leaders of the violence in Cairo warned white city officials, "Cairo will look like Rome burning down" if city leaders did not meet the demands of the black groups in Cairo by Sunday, July 23, 1967. The spokesman represented approximately one hundred black residents of the Pyramid Court housing project. They demanded new job opportunities, organized recreation programs for their children, and an end to police brutality. Cairo Mayor Lee Stenzel and other city leaders met with federal and state representatives to ensure that a plan was developed to satisfy the demands by the deadline in an effort to head off any additional rioting.

In response to the rioting, the white community in Cairo formed a citizens protection group that was deputized by the sheriff. The protection group became known as the "White Hats", because many of its 600 members began wearing white construction hats to show their membership while patrolling the streets to maintain order. In the following two years, accusations of White Hat bullying incidents in the black community began to increase. In early 1969, a few activists of the civil rights struggle formed the Cairo United Front, a civil rights organization to bring together the local NAACP, a cooperative association, and a couple of black street gangs. The Cairo United Front was formed to organize the efforts of the black population in Cairo to counter the White Hats. The United Front formally accused the White Hats of intimidating the black community, and presented a list of seven demands to the City of Cairo. The seven demands included appointment of a black police chief, appointment of a black assistant fire chief, and an equal black-white ratio in all city jobs.

Racial violence in Cairo reached a peak during summer 1969 as the Cairo United Front began leading protests and demonstrations to end segregation and draw attention to its seven demands. The protests led to a rash of violence that was stopped only when Illinois Governor Richard Ogilvie deployed National Guardsmen to restore the peace. In summer 1969, the Cairo United Front also began what became a decade-long boycott of white-owned businesses, which had generally not hired blacks as clerks or staff. The boycott encompassed virtually all the businesses in the town.

In December 1969, violence escalated again and several businesses were burned on Saturday, December 6. Early that morning, residents of the Pyramid Courts housing project opened fire on three firemen and the Chief of Police while they were responding to one of the intense fires. During the shootout, the Chief of Police and one of the firemen were shot by a high-powered rifle. Thirteen people were eventually arrested during the conflict. The Cairo Chief of Police resigned the next month, stating that Cairo lacked both the legal and physical means to deal with the "guerrilla warfare tactics" that had left the town in a state of turmoil for over two years.

To enforce the boycott, African-American picketing of businesses continued throughout 1970. In December, the city enacted a new city ordinance banning picketing within 20 feet of a business. Another large violent clash erupted as a result of the new city ordinance. Following the violence, the United Front called for another large rally and resumed picketing at white-owned businesses despite the new ordinance. The picketing turned violent after police heard shots fired and moved on the crowd.

In 1978, the Cairo I-57 Bridge across the Mississippi River was opened. The interstate largely bypassed Cairo to the north, crippling the remaining hospitality industry in the city. Cairo's hospital closed in December 1986, due to high debt and a dwindling number of patients.

=== Current status ===
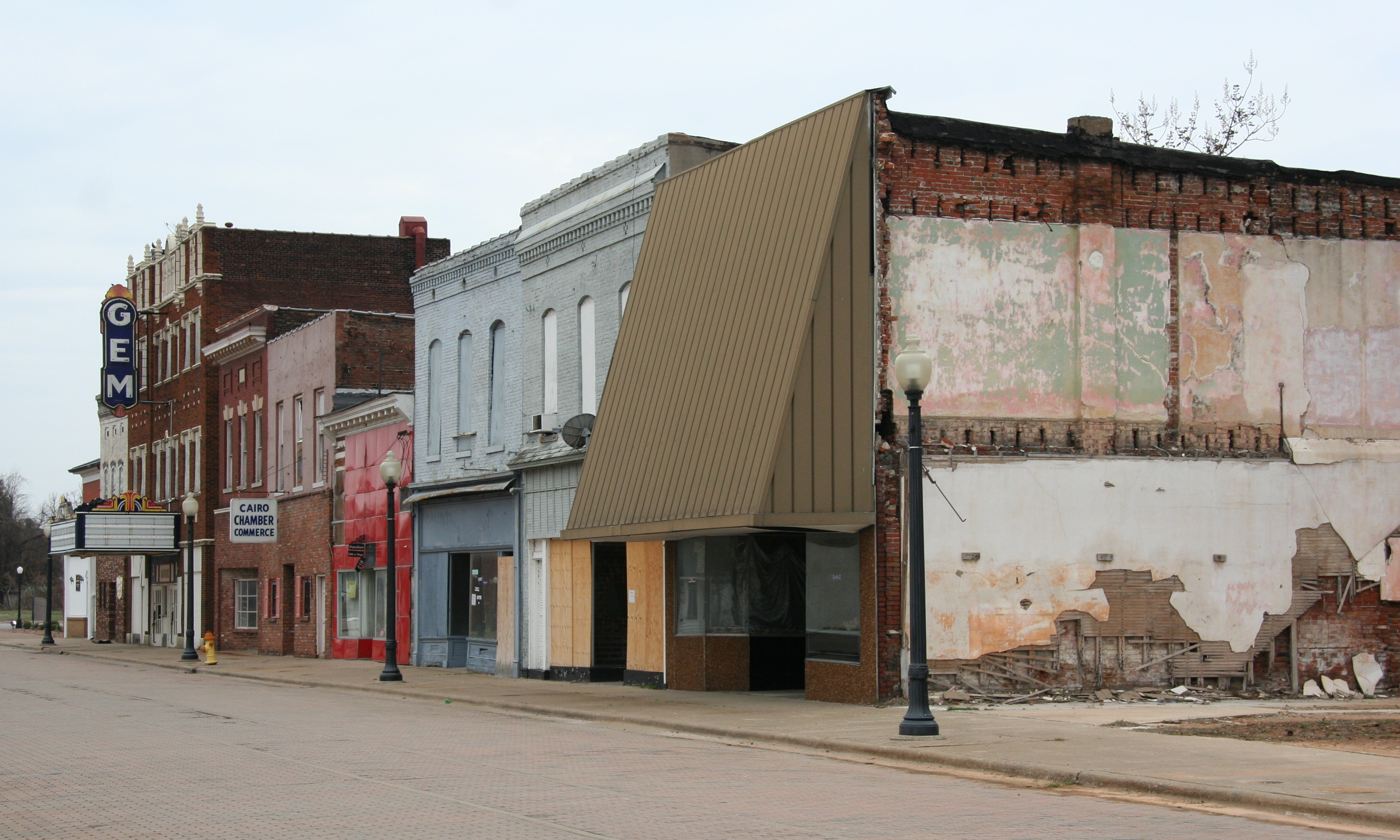
The mostly abandoned Historic Downtown Cairo.

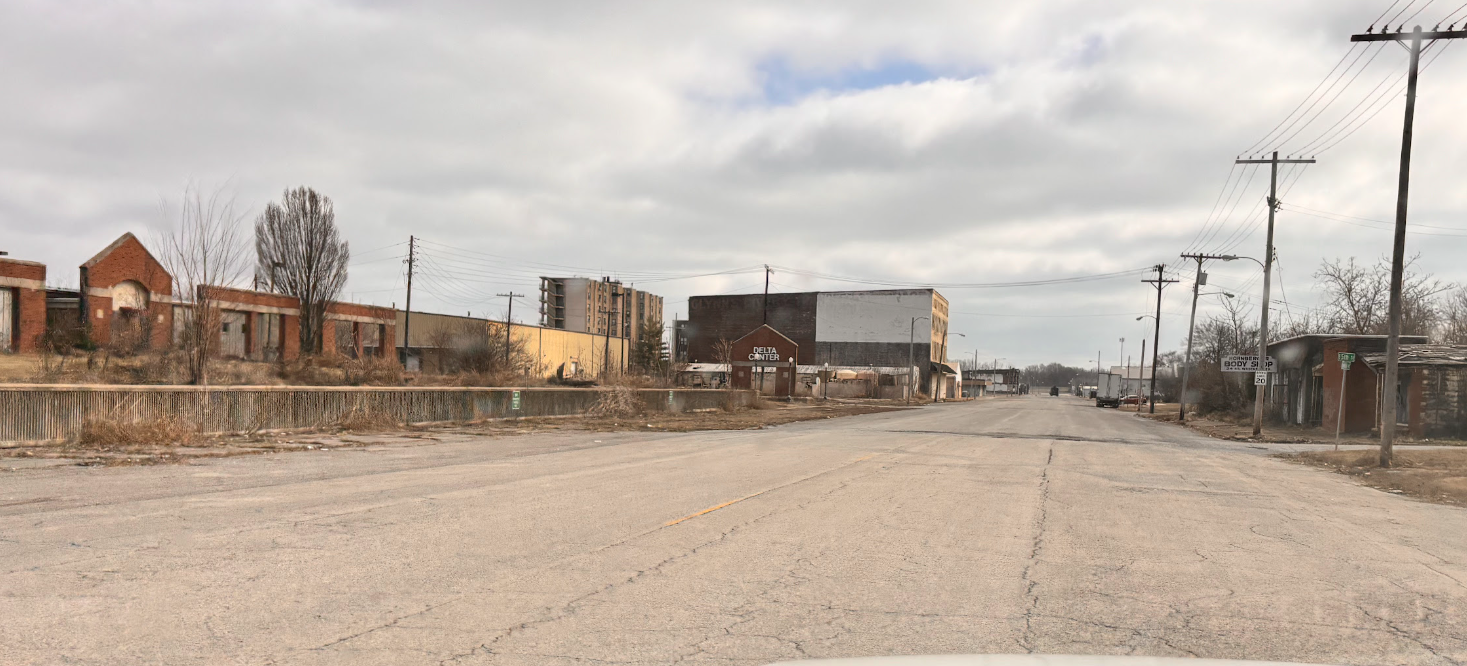
Commerce Street, with mostly ruined buildings.

With the decline in river trade, as has been the case in many other cities on the Mississippi, Cairo has suffered a marked decline in its economy and population. Its highest population was 15,203 in 1920; in 2020 it had 1,733 residents, about an 89% loss of population from its peak a century earlier. The city has decreased in population for eight consecutive US census reports from 1950 to 2020.

The city faces many significant socio-economic challenges for the remaining population, including poverty, crime, issues in education, unemployment and rebuilding its tax base.

The closure of the Elmwood and McBride housing projects was announced by the federal government in 2017. In August 2017, Ben Carson, the Secretary of Housing and Urban Development at the time, visited the city. Ten families had found new housing, but an estimated 400 people will be affected by the closure.

The community and region are working to stop abandonment of the city. They are restoring some architectural landmarks, and plan to develop heritage tourism focusing on the city's history and relationship to the Mississippi and Ohio rivers. Other cities have used such strategies to attract visitors and build new businesses to their communities.

A community health clinic offers medical and dental care, and several mental health services. Local media include the Cairo Citizen weekly newspaper. Radio station WKRO is licensed to Cairo.

In April 2019, plans to demolish the Elmwood and McBride complexes was announced and scheduled to be completed by September 2019. On May 3, 2019, demolition began of the complexes.

As of 2024, the city of Cairo is largely abandoned due to the severe floods, racial tensions, financial disparage, and lack of a viable population. The city had 1,506 residents as of 2024. In 2023, the first grocery store since 2015 was opened in the city; the store closed in 2025 after experiencing lower than expected sales. Cairo's Head Start, a preschool program, shut down in 2024.

== Geography ==
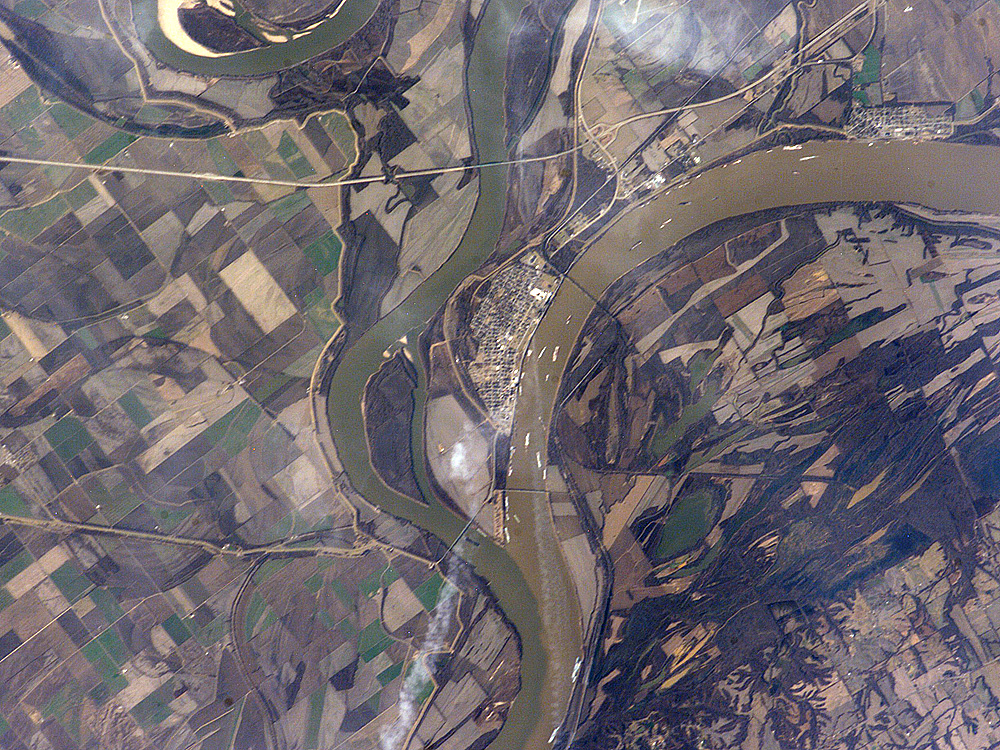
Cairo at the confluence of the Mississippi and Ohio rivers

Cairo is located at the confluence of the Ohio River with the Mississippi, near Mounds, Illinois. The elevation above sea level is 315 feet (96 m). The lowest point in the state of Illinois is located in Cairo at the Mississippi River.

In the 2021 census, Cairo has a total area of 9.11 square miles (23.59 km^{2}), of which 6.99 square miles (18.10 km^{2}) (or 76.72%) is land and 2.12 square miles (5.49 km^{2}) (or 23.28%) is water.

=== Climate ===
The city of Cairo has a humid subtropical climate (Köppen Cfa) and has many characteristics of a city in the Upper South. Summers are hot and humid, with a daily average in July of 79 °F (26.1 °C). Temperatures reach 90 °F (32 °C) on an average of 40 days annually. Winters are generally cool with mild periods, though extended stretches of cold can occur. Cairo's winter is typically mild by Illinois standards. The January daily average is 34 °F (1.1 °C).

Precipitation is spread relatively uniformly throughout the year. On average, Cairo's low elevation and proximity to the Mississippi and Ohio rivers prevent strong winter lows and plunging temperatures. During the summer months, those similar features retain heat and humidity, creating muggy conditions.

Climate data for Cairo, Illinois (1991–2020 normals)
Month	Jan	Feb	Mar	Apr	May	Jun	Jul	Aug	Sep	Oct	Nov	Dec	Year
Record high °F (°C)	75 (24)	77 (25)	85 (29)	94 (34)	98 (37)	106 (41)	108 (42)	103 (39)	103 (39)	92 (33)	82 (28)	79 (26)	108 (42)
Mean daily maximum °F (°C)	43.4 (6.3)	48.2 (9.0)	58.6 (14.8)	69.9 (21.1)	78.3 (25.7)	85.9 (29.9)	88.7 (31.5)	87.8 (31.0)	81.7 (27.6)	70.9 (21.6)	57.9 (14.4)	46.7 (8.2)	68.2 (20.1)
Daily mean °F (°C)	34.7 (1.5)	38.9 (3.8)	48.1 (8.9)	58.7 (14.8)	68.0 (20.0)	76.0 (24.4)	79.2 (26.2)	77.6 (25.3)	70.6 (21.4)	59.3 (15.2)	47.6 (8.7)	38.4 (3.6)	58.1 (14.5)
Mean daily minimum °F (°C)	26.0 (−3.3)	29.5 (−1.4)	37.6 (3.1)	47.5 (8.6)	57.7 (14.3)	66.1 (18.9)	69.6 (20.9)	67.5 (19.7)	59.6 (15.3)	47.7 (8.7)	37.4 (3.0)	30.1 (−1.1)	48.0 (8.9)
Record low °F (°C)	−12 (−24)	−5 (−21)	6 (−14)	25 (−4)	36 (2)	45 (7)	56 (13)	50 (10)	39 (4)	27 (−3)	5 (−15)	−9 (−23)	−12 (−24)
Average precipitation inches (mm)	3.80 (97)	3.88 (99)	4.85 (123)	5.38 (137)	5.08 (129)	4.37 (111)	4.10 (104)	3.18 (81)	3.51 (89)	4.14 (105)	4.46 (113)	4.25 (108)	51.00 (1,295)
Average snowfall inches (cm)	3.1 (7.9)	2.4 (6.1)	1.6 (4.1)	0 (0)	0 (0)	0 (0)	0 (0)	0 (0)	0 (0)	0 (0)	0.3 (0.76)	1.1 (2.8)	8.6 (22)
Mean monthly sunshine hours	144.4	150.5	198.0	238.8	277.8	307.4	318.9	300.8	242.4	216.9	139.3	125.4	2,660.6
Percentage possible sunshine	47	50	53	60	63	70	71	72	65	62	46	42	58
Source 1: NOAA (1991–2020 temperature and precipitation normals, sun 1961–1987)
Source 2: Western Regional Climate Center (snow normals 1948–2012), The Weather Channel (extremes)

== Demographics ==
Historical population
Census	Pop.	Note	%±
1850	242		—
1860	2,188		804.1%
1870	6,267		186.4%
1880	9,011		43.8%
1890	10,324		14.6%
1900	12,566		21.7%
1910	14,548		15.8%
1920	15,203		4.5%
1930	13,532		−11.0%
1940	14,407		6.5%
1950	12,123		−15.9%
1960	9,348		−22.9%
1970	6,277		−32.9%
1980	5,931		−5.5%
1990	4,846		−18.3%
2000	3,632		−25.1%
2010	2,831		−22.1%
2020	1,733		−38.8%
Decennial US Census

=== Racial and ethnic composition ===
Cairo city, Illinois – Racial and ethnic composition Note: the US Census treats Hispanic/Latino as an ethnic category. This table excludes Latinos from the racial categories and assigns them to a separate category. Hispanics/Latinos may be of any race.
Race / ethnicity (NH = Non-Hispanic)	Pop 2000	Pop 2010	Pop 2020	% 2000	% 2010	% 2020
White alone (NH)	1,300	775	434	35.79%	27.38%	25.04%
Black or African American alone (NH)	2,236	1,969	1,193	61.56%	69.55%	68.84%
Native American or Alaska Native alone (NH)	3	5	5	0.08%	0.18%	0.29%
Asian alone (NH)	26	12	0	0.72%	0.42%	0.00%
Native Hawaiian or Pacific Islander alone (NH)	1	1	0	0.03%	0.04%	0.00%
Other race alone (NH)	3	2	5	0.08%	0.07%	0.29%
Mixed race or Multiracial (NH)	36	56	76	0.99%	1.98%	4.39%
Hispanic or Latino (any race)	27	11	20	0.74%	0.39%	1.15%
Total	3,632	2,831	1,733	100.00%	100.00%	100.00%

=== 2020 census ===
As of the 2020 census, Cairo had a population of 1,733. There were 823 households and 377 families residing in the city. The median age was 49.4 years. 20.1% of residents were under the age of 18 and 24.9% were 65 years of age or older. For every 100 females, there were 93.0 males, and for every 100 females age 18 and over, there were 91.4 males.

0.0% of residents lived in urban areas, while 100.0% lived in rural areas.

Of all households, 22.0% had children under the age of 18 living in them. 21.1% were married-couple households, 28.6% were households with a male householder and no spouse or partner present, and 45.6% were households with a female householder and no spouse or partner present. About 47.0% of all households were made up of individuals and 20.0% had someone living alone who was 65 years of age or older.

There were 1,036 housing units, with a population density of 190.29 inhabitants per square mile (73.47/km^{2}) and an average housing density of 113.76 per square mile (43.92/km^{2}). Of all housing units, 20.6% were vacant. The homeowner vacancy rate was 1.9% and the rental vacancy rate was 4.1%.

The median income for a household in the city was $27,661, and the median income for a family was $31,280. Males had a median income of $14,464 versus $21,188 for females. The per capita income for the city was $19,661. About 32.9% of families and 36.2% of the population were below the poverty line, including 72.1% of those under age 18 and 14.2% of those age 65 or over.

=== 2010 census ===
In the 2010 census, there were 2,831 people, 1,268 households, and 677 families residing in the city. There were 1,599 housing units. The racial makeup of the city was 69.6% Black or African American, 27.9% White, less than 0.1% Native American, less than 0.1% Asian, less than 0.1% Pacific Islander, less than 0.1% from other races, and 2.0% from two or more races. Hispanic or Latino of any race were less than 0.1% of the population.

There were 1,268 households, of which 26.7% had children under the age of 18 living with them, 21.2% were married couples living together, 28.5% had a female householder with no husband present, and 46.6% were non-families. 43.5% of all households were made up of individuals, and 15.2% had someone living alone who was 65 years of age or older. The average household size was 2.15 and the average family size was 3.00.

The distribution of the population by age was 31.6% 19 or under, 6.3% from 20 to 24, 19.2% from 25 to 44, 26.2% from 45 to 64, and 16.6% 65 or older. The median age was 36.9 years.

The median income for a household in the city was $16,682, and the median income for a family was $31,507. Males working full-time, year-round had a median income of $37,750 versus $21,917 for females. The per capita income for the city was $12,461. About 33.0% of families and 44.2% of the population were living below the poverty line, including 71.7% of those under the age of 18 and 20.6% of those ages 65 and older.

=== 2000 census ===
In the 2000 census, there were 3,632 people, 1,561 households, and 900 families residing in the city. The population density was 515.1 inhabitants per square mile (198.9/km^{2}). There were 1,885 housing units at an average density of 103.2 per km^{2} (267.3 per sq mi). The racial makeup of the city was 35.93% white, 61.70% black or African American, 0.08% Native American, 0.72% Asian, 0.03% Pacific Islander, 0.36% from other races, and 1.18% from two or more races. Hispanic or Latino of any race were 0.74% of the population.

There were 1,561 households, out of which 30.4% had children under the age of 18 living with them, 29.3% were married couples living together, 25.2% had a female householder with no husband present, and 42.3% were non-families. 39.7% of all households were made up of individuals, and 17.6% had someone living alone who was 65 years of age or older. The average household size was 2.26 and the average family size was 3.08.

The distribution of the population by age was 30.4% under 18, 8.1% from 18 to 24, 22.0% from 25 to 44, 21.6% from 45 to 64, and 17.9% who were 65 or older. The median age was 36 years. For every 100 females, there were 79.5 males. For every 100 females age 18 and over, there were 70.2 males.

The median income for a household in the city was $21,607, and the median income for a family was $28,242. Males had a median income of $28,798 versus $18,125 for females. The per capita income for the city was $16,220. About 27.1% of families and 33.5% of the population were living below the poverty line, including 47.0% of those under the age of 18 and 20.9% of those ages 65 and older.

== Education ==
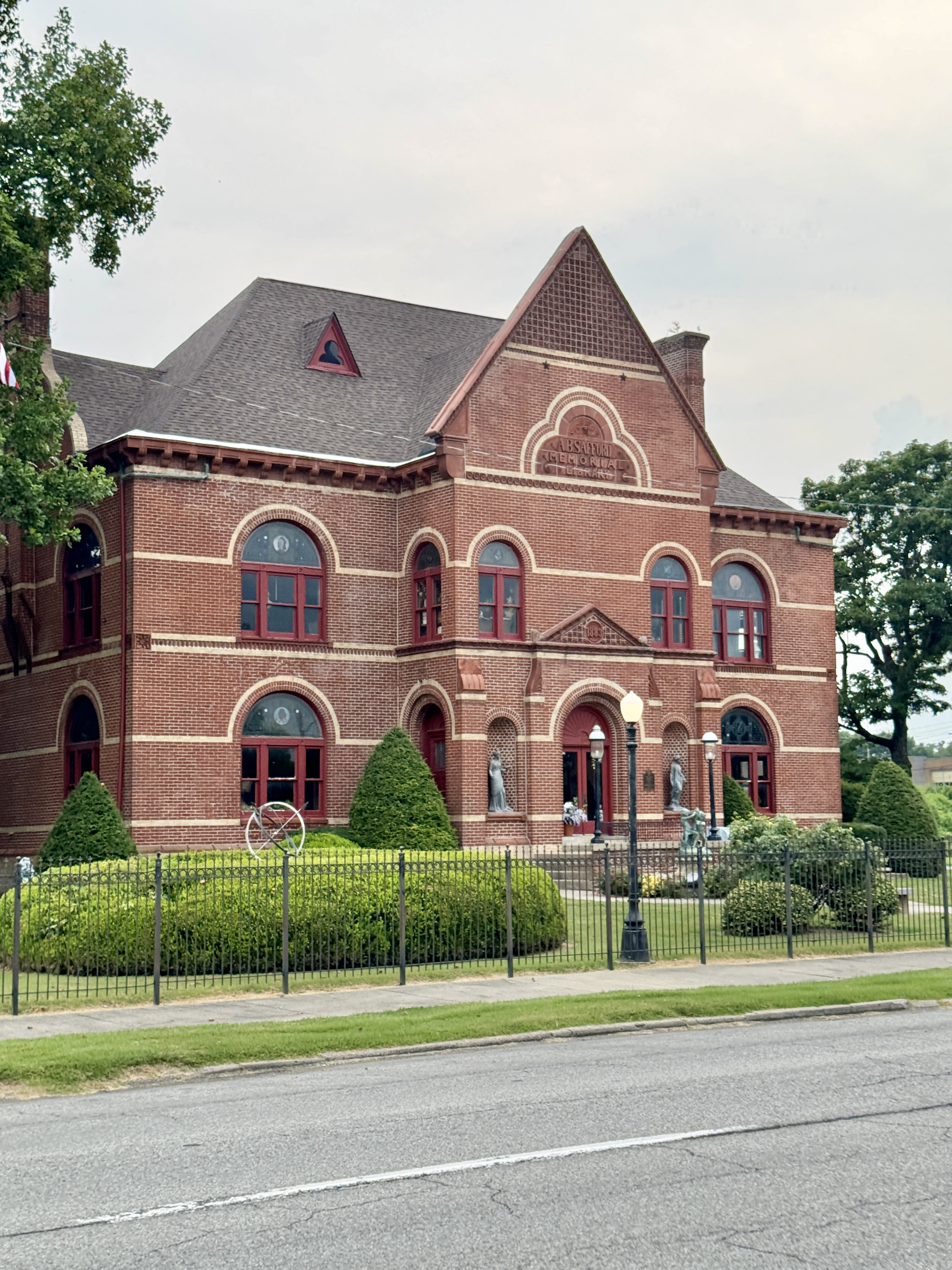
Cairo Public Library (Anna B. Safford Memorial Library)

The city is served by Cairo Community Unit School District 1. In 2008, the Cairo school district had the highest percentage in Illinois of children in poverty, at 60.6%. It was the fifteenth highest percentage of any city in the United States. The district has one elementary school, Emerson Elementary School. Middle and high school students attend Cairo Junior/Senior High School. Bennett Elementary School closed in 2010.

The Roman Catholic Diocese of Belleville formerly operated St. Joseph Grade School. It was previously K–12, but by 2001 it had only elementary grades. Enrollment was over 130 during the 1976–1977 school year. This figure dropped to 63 in 2000, and then 25, including seven Catholic students, in the 2002–2003 school year. The school closed in 2003.

Shawnee Community College opened an extension center in Cairo in January 2019.

Cairo Public Library (a.k.a. the Anna B. Safford Memorial Library) is in the community.

== Government ==
Cairo is in Illinois's 12th congressional district and is represented in Congress by Republican Mike Bost.

== Transportation ==
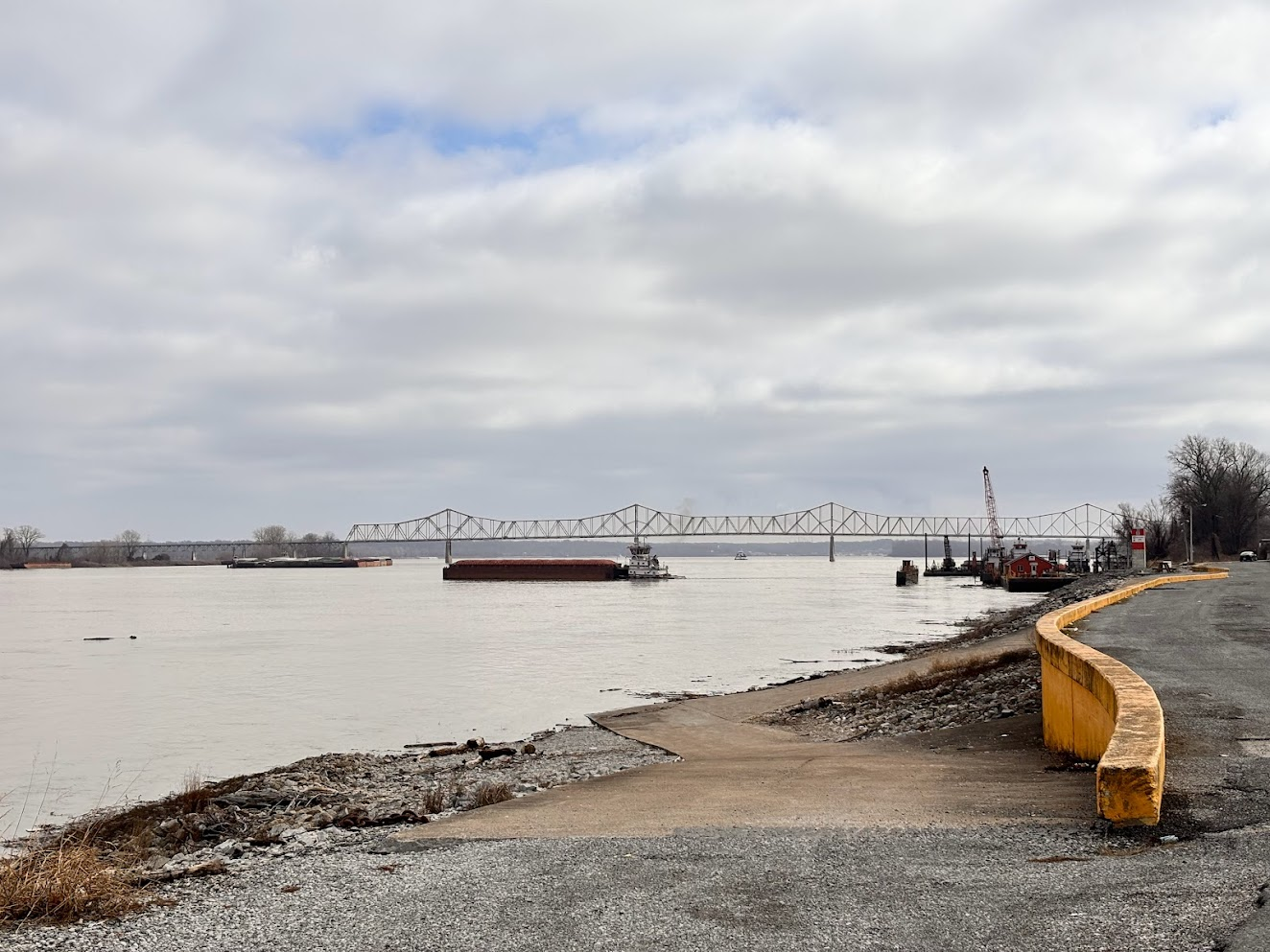
The Ohio River waterfront in Cairo. Although no longer a significant hub, the city still sees commercial activity on its riverbanks.

Amtrak's Chicago–New Orleans City of New Orleans served Cairo until October 25, 1987; since then, its closest stops to Cairo are Carbondale, Illinois, 53 miles (85 km) to the north, and Fulton, Kentucky, 43 miles (69 km) to the south.

Major highways include:

- I-57
- US 62
- US 60
- US 51
- IL 3

Cairo's location on a spit of land that lies between the Mississippi and Ohio rivers made overlapping US 60 and 62 briefly through Illinois more practical than directly connecting Missouri and Kentucky.

Cairo Regional Airport provides general aviation service to the city.

The closest airports with regular service are Barkley Regional Airport and Cape Girardeau Regional Airport. The airports are approximately 23 miles and 26 miles away, respectively.

== Landmarks and points of interest ==
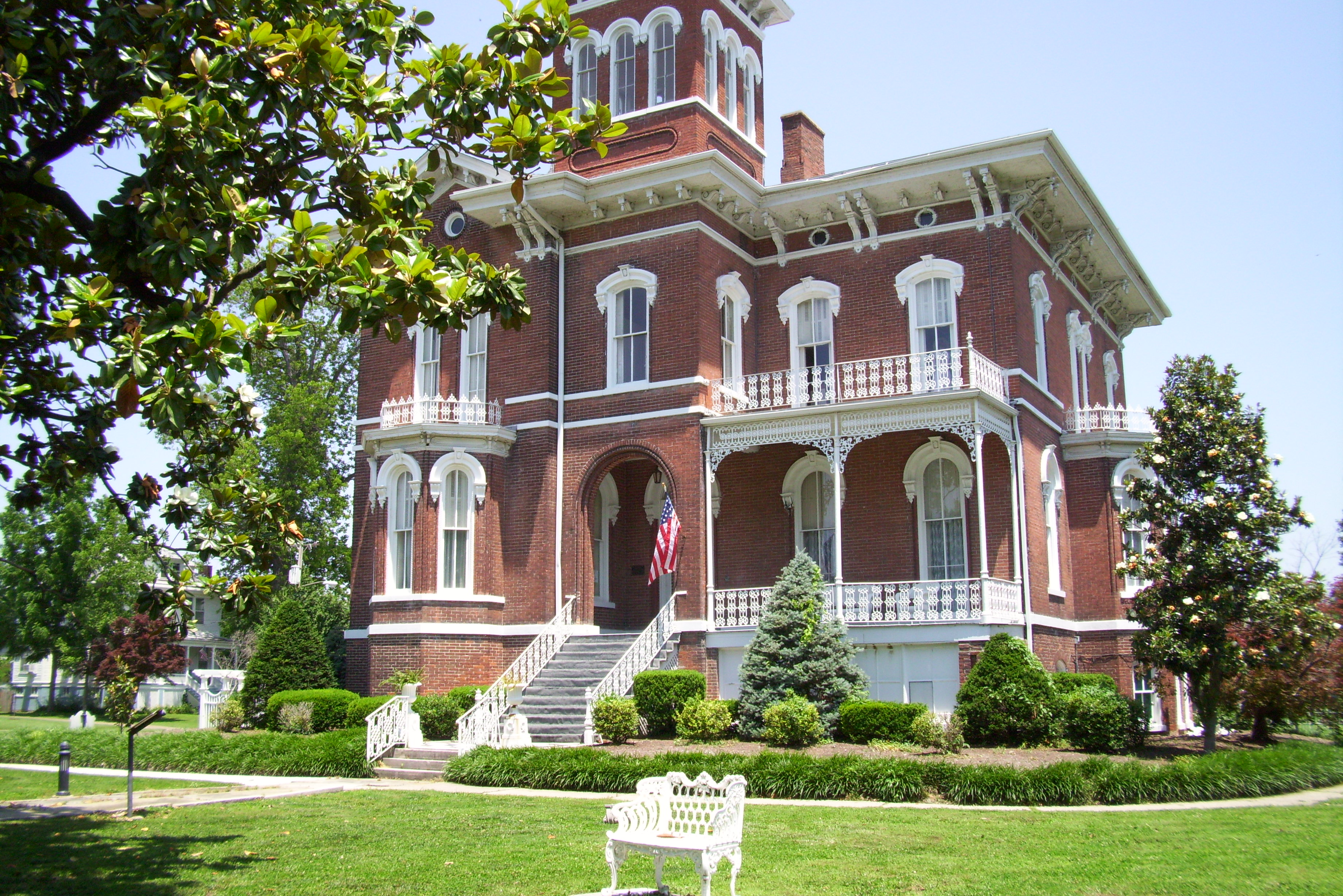
Magnolia Manor

Magnolia Manor is a postbellum manor, built by the Cairo businessman Charles A. Galigher in 1869. It is a 14-room red brick house which features double walls intended to keep out the city's famous dampness with their ten-inch airspaces. Inside the home are many original, 19th-century furnishings. It has been listed on the National Register of Historic Places since December 1969. The house is operated as a Victorian period historic house museum by the Cairo Historical Association.

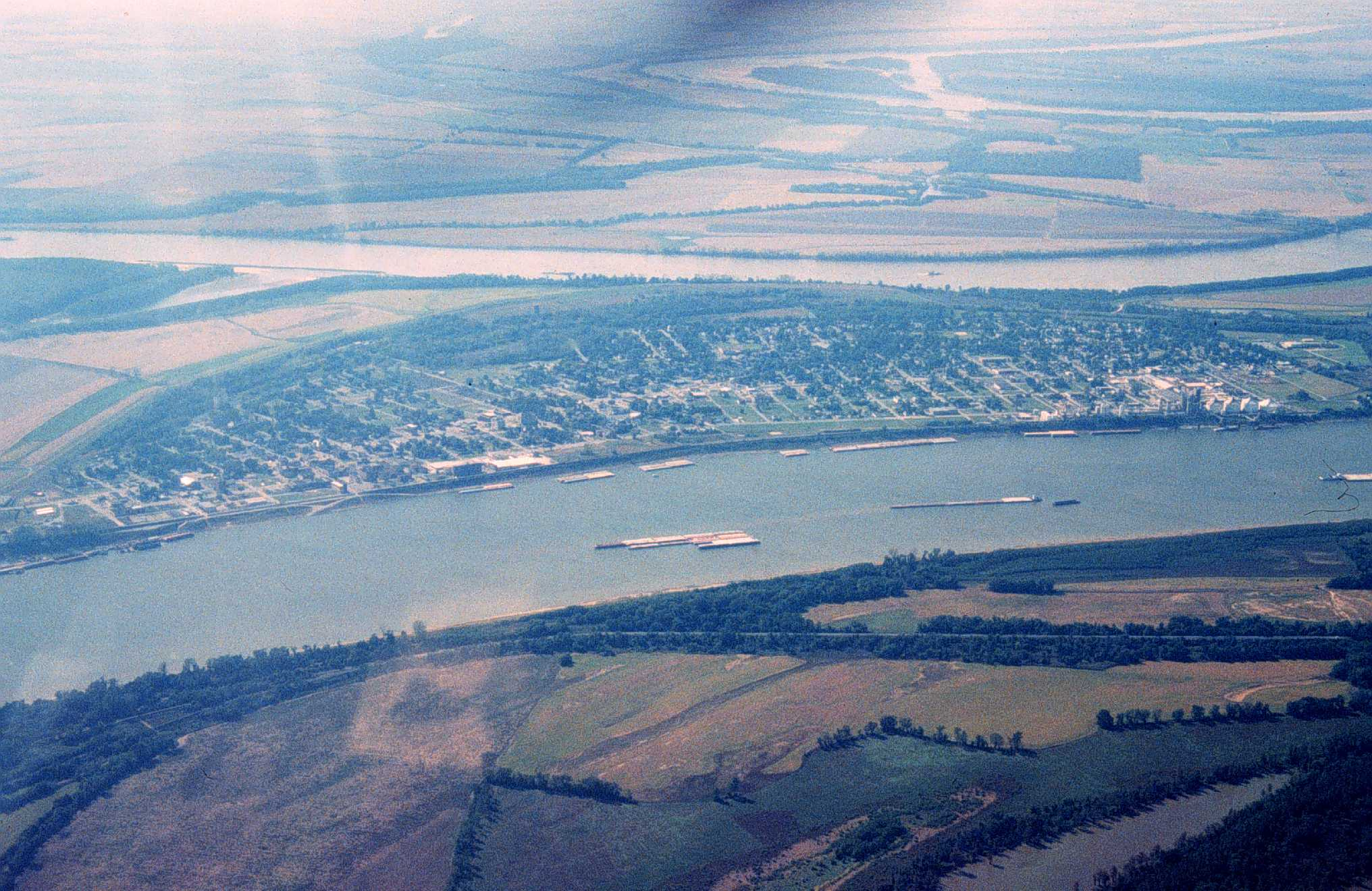
A 1997 aerial view of Cairo, with Ohio River in foreground, Mississippi River in background

Other points of interest include:

- Fort Defiance Park
- Gem Theatre
- The Hewer, a 1902 public sculpture by George Gray Barnard
- Cairo Custom House & Post Office
- The Riverlore
- A. B. Safford Memorial Library
- Millionaire's Row, and the Riverlore Mansion, and Magnolia Manor

== In popular culture ==
- Cairo was the original destination for Huck and Jim in Mark Twain's The Adventures of Huckleberry Finn, as they planned to paddle up the Ohio River to obtain freedom for Jim. They drifted past Cairo by mistake and ended up in the slave state of Arkansas instead. Twain also noted Cairo in his non-fiction Life on the Mississippi.
- Charles Dickens visited Cairo in 1842 and was unimpressed with what he saw as a disease-ridden backwater. It became the model for the town of Eden in his 1843–44 novel Martin Chuzzlewit.
- Stephen Foster in 1850 wrote and published a popular minstrel song called "Way Down in Ca-i-ro"
- The musician Stace England produced a concept music CD called Greetings From Cairo, Illinois (2005), inspired by the city's turbulent history.
- Cairo appears in Neil Gaiman's 2001 novel American Gods, with the Egyptian gods Thoth and Anubis having taken on the guise of funeral home operators in the town.

== Sports ==
- Cairo had its own minor-league baseball team (variously known as the Egyptians, Champions, Giants and Dodgers) in the Kentucky–Illinois–Tennessee League in 1903–1906, 1911–1914, 1922–1924 and 1946–1950.
- The St. Louis Cardinals of the National League held their annual spring training camp in Cairo from 1943 to 1945, due to travel restrictions imposed by Major League Baseball during World War II.

== See also ==
- Illinois in the Civil War
- List of cities and towns along the Ohio River
- Steamboats of the Mississippi
- USS Cairo
