= Old Custom House (Cairo, Illinois) =

Historic government building in Illinois, United States

- Old Customhouse
- U.S. National Register of Historic Places
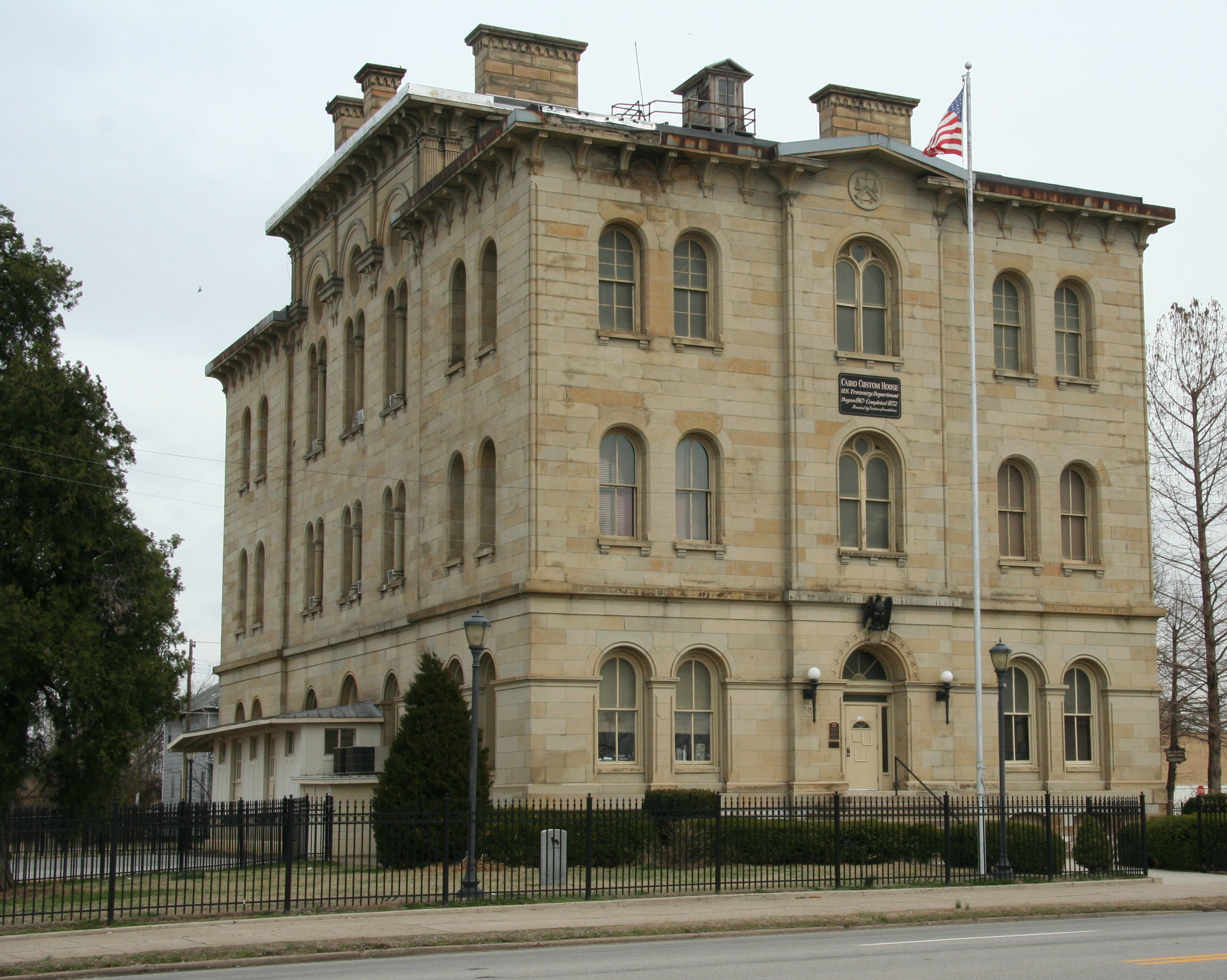

- Location within Illinois Location within the United States
- Location: 1400 Washington Ave., Cairo, Illinois
- Coordinates: 37°00′10″N 89°10′19″W
- Area: 1 acre (0.40 ha)
- Built: 1869–72
- Architect: Alfred B. Mullet
- Architectural style: Italianate
- NRHP reference No.: 73000689
- Added to NRHP: July 24, 1973

The Old Custom House is a historic government building in downtown Cairo, Illinois. Built from 1869 to 1872, the building served as a customs house, post office, and courthouse. Alfred B. Mullett, the U.S. Supervising Architect at the time, designed the building in the Italianate style, a rarity among federal buildings; his design features a bracketed cornice and rounded windows. When Cairo built a new post office in 1942, the building became the town's police station. The building is one of the few surviving U.S. custom houses and one of the largest federal buildings of its era in the Mid-Mississippi Valley region.

The custom house was added to the National Register of Historic Places on July 24, 1973. It now serves as a history museum.

In celebration of the 2018 Illinois Bicentennial, Cairo Custom House was selected as one of the Illinois 200 Great Places by the American Institute of Architects Illinois component (AIA Illinois).

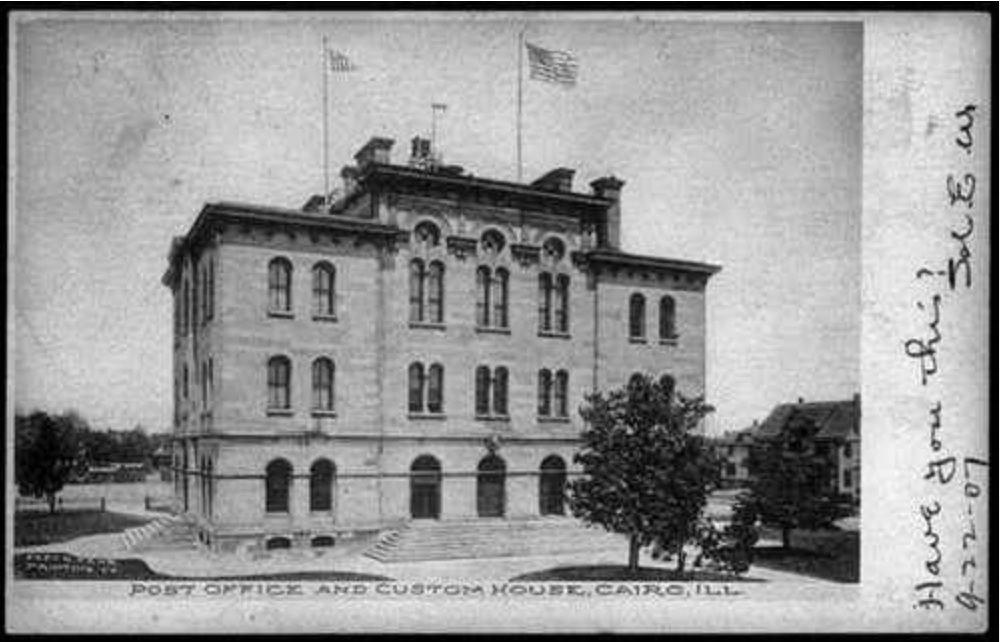
Old Custom House (Cairo, Illinois) 1907. Now - Cairo Custom House Museum, 1400 Washington Avenue, Cairo, IL
