= WMJL (AM) =

- Marion, Kentucky; United States
- Frequency: 1500 kHz

Programming
- Format: Silent

Ownership
- Owner: Sun Media; (Samuel K. Stratemeyer)
- Sister stations: WMJL-FM

History
- First air date: July 10, 1968; 57 years ago

Technical information
- Licensing authority: FCC
- Facility ID: 31435
- Class: D
- Power: 175 watts day
- Transmitter coordinates: 37°20′16″N 88°4′03″W

Links
- Public license information: Public file; LMS

WMJL (1500 AM) is a radio station licensed to Marion, Kentucky, United States. The station is owned by Sun Media.

== History ==
The station signed on the air on July 10, 1968, under ownership of the Crittenden County Broadcasting Company. It was a country music station for much of its time on the air.
