= KLUE =

Radio station in Poplar Bluff, Missouri

- Poplar Bluff, Missouri; United States
- Frequency: 103.5 MHz
- Branding: KLUE 103.5

Programming
- Format: Contemporary Hit Radio

Ownership
- Owner: Benjamin Stratemeyer
- Sister stations: KZMA

History
- First air date: 1999
- Former call signs: KZMA (1990–2003)
- Call sign meaning: The word "clue"

Technical information
- Licensing authority: FCC
- Facility ID: 15942
- Class: C2
- ERP: 50,000 watts
- HAAT: 99 meters (325 ft)
- Transmitter coordinates: 36°50′50″N 90°19′52″W

Links
- Public license information: Public file; LMS
- Website: Official website www.kluefm.com

KLUE (103.5 FM, "KLUE 103.5") is a radio station broadcasting a Contemporary Hit Radio music format. Licensed to Poplar Bluff, Missouri, United States, the station is currently owned by Benjamin Stratemeyer and features live and local programming.

== History ==
The Federal Communications Commission issued a construction permit for the station to Twin Eagle Communications on October 26, 1990. The station was assigned the call sign KZMA on December 12, 1990, and received its license to cover on February 2, 1999. On April 26, 2002, Twin Eagle assigned the station's license to the current owner, Benjamin Stratemeyer, at a price of $800,000. On March 27, 2003, the station changed its call sign to the current KLUE.
