= Magnolia Manor (Cairo, Illinois) =

Historic house in Illinois, United States

- U.S. National Register of Historic Places
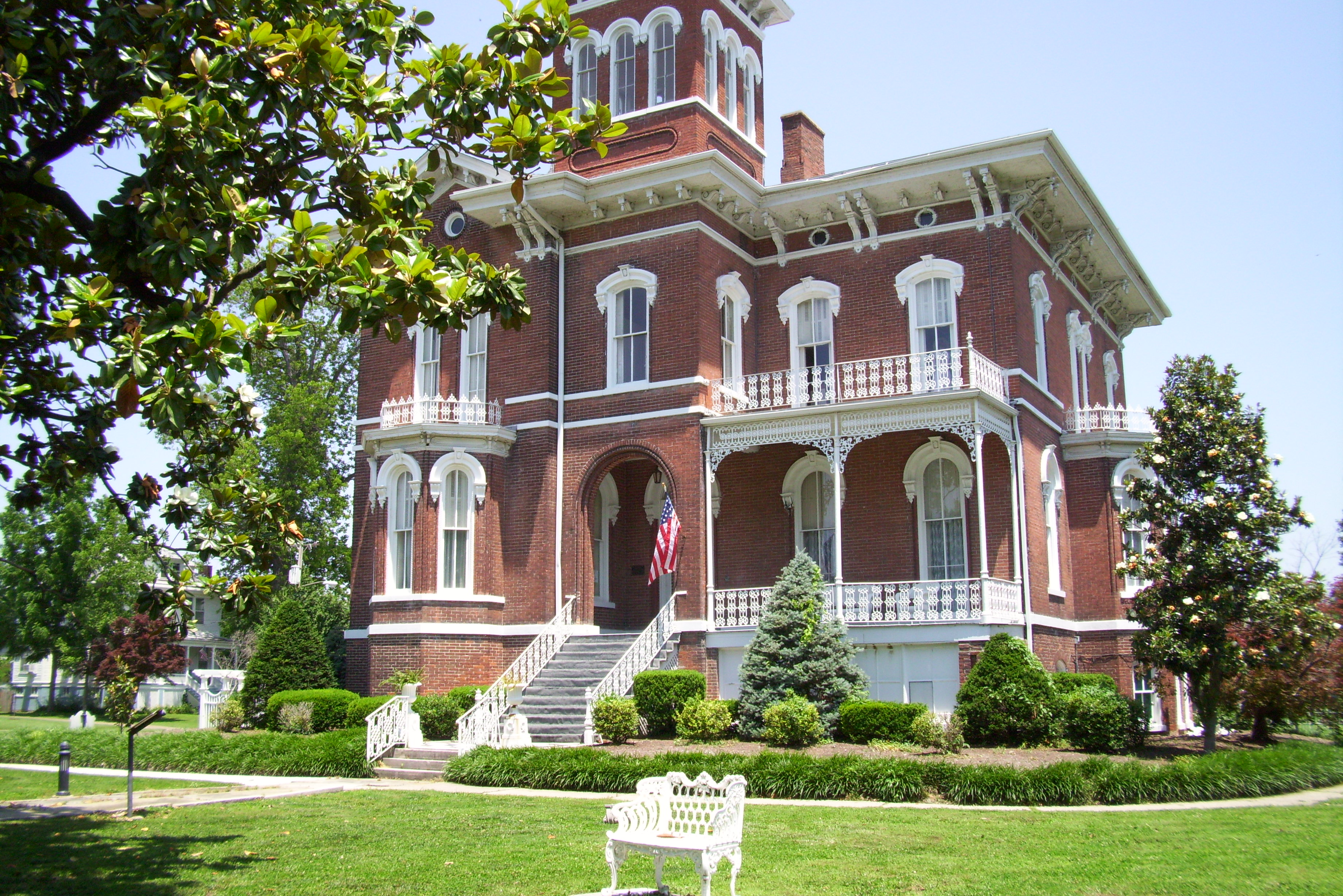
- Front of the house

- Location within Illinois
- Location: 2700 Washington Ave. Cairo, Illinois, Alexander County, Illinois
- Coordinates: 37°0′34″N 89°10′57″W
- Area: less than one acre
- Built: 1869
- Architectural style: Italianate
- NRHP reference No.: 69000053
- Added to NRHP: December 17, 1969

Magnolia Manor is a manor located in Cairo, Illinois, located in Alexander County built in 1869. It has been listed on the National Register of Historic Places since December 17, 1969.

The house is operated as a Victorian period historic house museum by the Cairo Historical Association.

== History ==
The manor was built by the Cairo businessman Charles A. Galigher in 1869. It is a 14-room red brick house which features double walls intended to keep out the city's famous dampness with their ten-inch airspaces. Inside the home are many original, 19th-century furnishings. Galigher became a friend of Ulysses S. Grant during the time Grant had command in Cairo. When Grant retired after two terms as president he was subject of a lavish celebration at Magnolia Manor.
