= WIBV =

- Mount Vernon, Illinois; United States
- Broadcast area: Mount Vernon; Centralia
- Frequency: 102.1 MHz
- Branding: Cardinal Country

Programming
- Format: Country music

Ownership
- Owner: Benjamin Stratemeyer

Technical information
- Licensing authority: FCC
- Facility ID: 15485
- Class: B1
- ERP: 10,500 watts
- HAAT: 155 meters (509 ft)
- Transmitter coordinates: 38°24′7″N 89°8′9″W

Links
- Public license information: Public file; LMS

WIBV (102.1 FM) is a radio station broadcasting a country music format. Licensed to Mount Vernon, Illinois, United States, the station serves the areas of Mount Vernon and Centralia, and is owned by Benjamin Stratemeyer.
