= KZMA =

- Naylor, Missouri; United States
- Broadcast area: Poplar Bluff, Missouri
- Frequency: 99.9 MHz
- Branding: Z100

Programming
- Format: Adult contemporary

Ownership
- Owner: Daniel S. Stratemeyer

History
- First air date: 2005

Technical information
- Licensing authority: FCC
- Facility ID: 89496
- Class: A
- ERP: 4,200 watts
- HAAT: 118 meters (387 ft)
- Transmitter coordinates: 36°39′43″N 90°29′16″W

Links
- Public license information: Public file; LMS
- Website: kzmaz100.com

KZMA is a radio station airing an adult contemporary format licensed to Naylor, Missouri, broadcasting on 99.9 FM. The station serves the Poplar Bluff, Missouri area and is owned by Daniel S. Stratemeyer.
