= WRIK =

Coordinates: 37°8′31″N 83°38′58″W

- Brookport, Illinois; United States
- Broadcast area: Paducah, Kentucky
- Frequency: 750 kHz
- Branding: River Country 97.5

Programming
- Format: Country music

Ownership
- Owner: Daniel S. Stratemeyer

History
- First air date: 1988
- Former call signs: WZOM (?-1987); WRIK (1987–2003); WSBX (2003); WNTX (2003–2005); WTHQ (2005–2013)

Technical information
- Licensing authority: FCC
- Facility ID: 63816
- Class: D
- Power: 500 watts day
- Translator: 97.5 W248CP (Paducah)

Links
- Public license information: Public file; LMS

WRIK 750 AM is a radio station broadcasting a country music format. Licensed to Brookport, Illinois, the station serves the Paducah, Kentucky area operating only during daytime hours, and is owned by Daniel S. Stratemeyer.

WRIK also broadcasts on F.M. over a translator on 97.5 MHz, using the moniker River Country.
